= This Is the House That Jack Built =

British nursery rhyme and cumulative tale

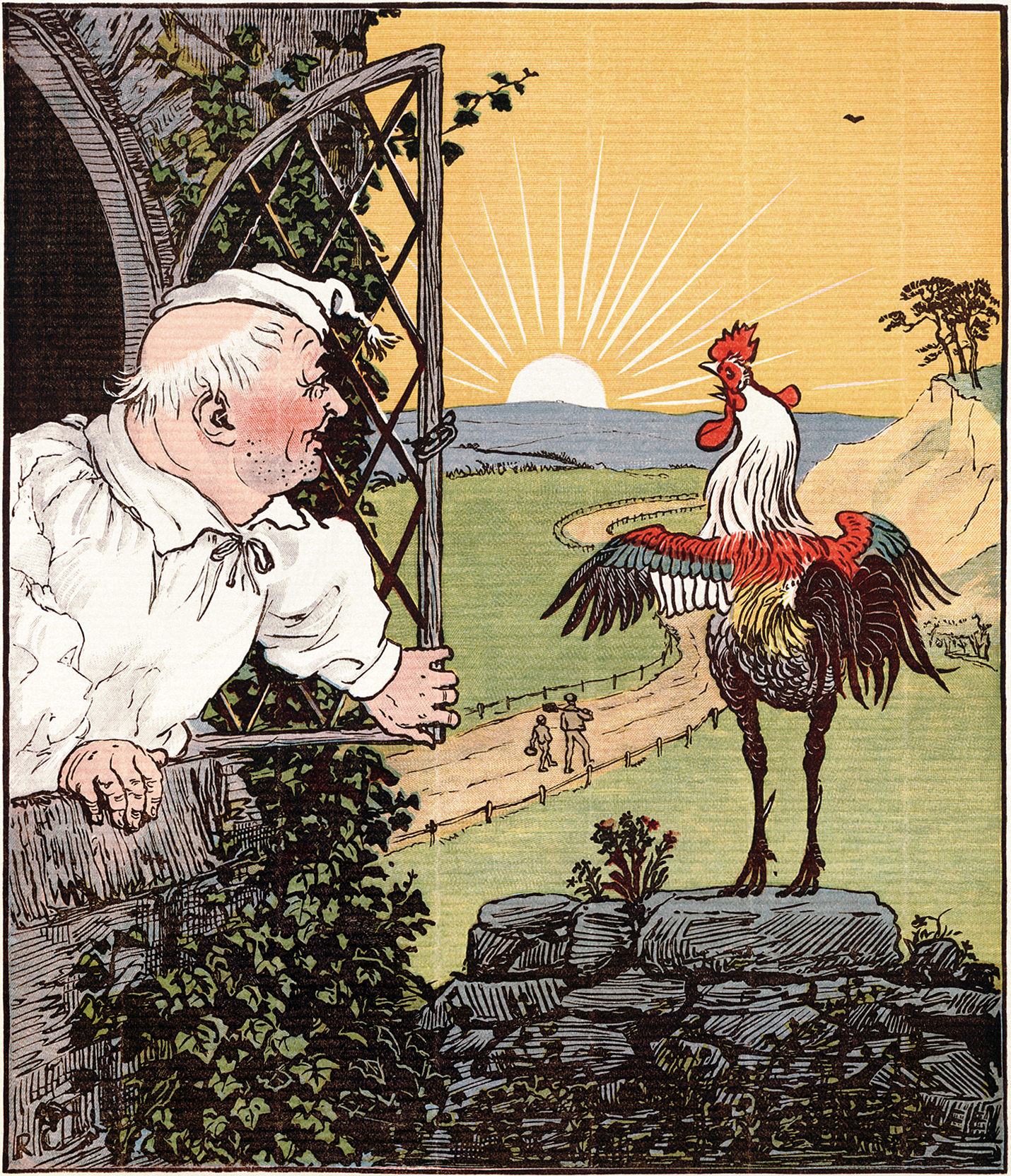
- Randolph Caldecott illustration from The complete collection of pictures & songs, published 1887 (digitally restored)

Nursery rhyme
- Published: 1755

"This Is the House That Jack Built" is a popular English nursery rhyme and cumulative tale. It has a Roud Folk Song Index number of 20854. It is Aarne–Thompson–Uther Index type 2035.

== Lyrics ==
This is perhaps the most common set of modern lyrics:

This is the house that Jack built.

This is the malt that lay in the house that Jack built.

This is the rat that ate the malt
That lay in the house that Jack built.

This is the cat
That killed the rat that ate the malt
That lay in the house that Jack built.

This is the dog that worried the cat
That killed the rat that ate the malt
That lay in the house that Jack built.

This is the cow with the crumpled horn
That tossed the dog that worried the cat
That killed the rat that ate the malt
That lay in the house that Jack built.

This is the maiden all forlorn
That milked the cow with the crumpled horn
That tossed the dog that worried the cat
That killed the rat that ate the malt
That lay in the house that Jack built.

This is the man all tattered and torn
That kissed the maiden all forlorn
That milked the cow with the crumpled horn
That tossed the dog that worried the cat
That killed the rat that ate the malt
That lay in the house that Jack built.

This is the priest all shaven and shorn
That married the man all tattered and torn
That kissed the maiden all forlorn
That milked the cow with the crumpled horn
That tossed the dog that worried the cat
That killed the rat that ate the malt
That lay in the house that Jack built.

This is the cock that crowed in the morn
That woke the priest all shaven and shorn
That married the man all tattered and torn
That kissed the maiden all forlorn
That milked the cow with the crumpled horn
That tossed the dog that worried the cat
That killed the rat that ate the malt
That lay in the house that Jack built.

This is the farmer sowing his corn
That kept the cock that crowed in the morn
That woke the priest all shaven and shorn
That married the man all tattered and torn
That kissed the maiden all forlorn
That milked the cow with the crumpled horn
That tossed the dog that worried the cat
That killed the rat that ate the malt
That lay in the house that Jack built.

This is the horse and the hound and the horn
That belonged to the farmer sowing his corn
That kept the cock that crowed in the morn
That woke the priest all shaven and shorn
That married the man all tattered and torn
That kissed the maiden all forlorn
That milked the cow with the crumpled horn
That tossed the dog that worried the cat
That killed the rat that ate the malt
That lay in the house that Jack built.

== Variations ==
Some versions use "cheese" instead of "malt", "judge" instead of "priest", "rooster" instead of "cock", the archaic past tense form "crew" instead of "crowed", "shook" instead of "tossed", or "chased" in place of "killed". Also in some versions the horse, the hound, and the horn are left out and the rhyme ends with the farmer.

== Translations ==
- The rhyme was translated into Dutch by Annie M.G. Schmidt as Het huis dat Japie heeft gebouwd (literally: "The house that Japie (has) built").
- A Spanish translation also exists.
- Also translated into Russian by Samuil Marshak as Дом, который построил Джек. This version is wildly different and features the house that Jack built, in which there is a dark closet in which lies grain which is stolen by a tit which is hunted by a cat. A dog without a tail comes and shakes the cat by the scruff of the neck. A cow with no horns kicks the dog, and is milked by a grey-haired old woman who argues with a lazy and sleepy shepherd. Two roosters then arrive and wake the shepherd up.
- Translation into Brazilian Portuguese https://www.amazon.com/gp/product/B0C1W21HQ3

== Narrative technique ==
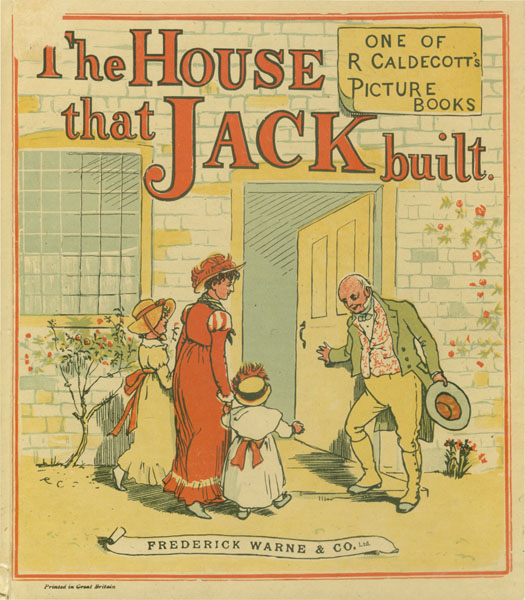
This Is the House that Jack Built illustrated by Randolph Caldecott

It is a cumulative tale that does not tell the story of Jack's house, or even of Jack who built the house, but instead shows how the house is indirectly linked to other things and people, and through this method tells the story of "The man all tattered and torn", and the "Maiden all forlorn", as well as other smaller events, showing how these are interlinked.

== Origins ==
It has been argued that the rhyme is derived from an Aramaic (Jewish) hymn Chad Gadya (lit., "One Young Goat") in Sepher Haggadah, first printed in 1590; but although this is an early cumulative tale that may have inspired the form, the lyrics bear little relationship. It was suggested by James Orchard Halliwell that the reference to the "priest all shaven and shorn" indicates that the English version is probably very old, presumably as far back as the mid-sixteenth century. There is a possible reference to the song in The Boston New Letter of 12 April 1739 and the line: "This is the man all forlorn, &c". However, it did not appear in print until it was included in Nurse Truelove's New-Year's-Gift, or the Book of Books for Children, printed in London in 1755. It was printed in numerous collections in the late eighteenth and early nineteenth centuries.

Randolph Caldecott produced an illustrated version in 1878 which proved to be extremely popular. Many of the scenes in his pictures are of northern Shropshire where he spent his youth. Cherrington Manor, a timber-framed house in North East Shropshire, with a malt house in the grounds, is believed locally to have inspired Caldecott's depiction of the House that Jack built, although the Ralph Caldecott Society states that Brook House Farm in Hanmer is more likely.

== Syntactic structure ==
Each sentence in the story is an example of an increasingly deeply nested relative clause. The last version, "This is the horse...", would be quite difficult to untangle if the previous ones were not present. See the Noun Phrase for more details about postmodification of the noun phrase in this manner.

== See also ==
- Cumulative song
- Chad Gadya
- There Was an Old Lady Who Swallowed a Fly
