= Kidsongs =

American children's media franchise

- 1990–1998 logo
- Genre: Children's music sing-along
- Created by: Carol Rosenstein; Bruce Gowers
- Written by: Carol Rosenstein; Abbie Crow Rich (1986); Bruce Gowers
- Directed by: Bruce Gowers
- Composer: Michael Lloyd
- Country of origin: United States
- Original language: English
- No. of episodes: 25

Production
- Executive producers: Carol Rosenstein; Bruce Gowers; James Rich Jr. (1986)
- Producer: Carol Rosenstein
- Camera setup: Multiple-camera setup
- Production companies: Together Again Video Productions (1986–1996); Together Again Productions (1996–1998); Warner Bros. Records (1986–1996); Sony Wonder (1997–1998)

Original release
- Release: April 1986 – September 18, 1998

Kidsongs is an American children's media franchise that includes Kidsongs Music Video Stories on DVD and video, the Kidsongs TV series, CDs of children's songs, songbooks, sheet music, toys and merchandise website. It was created by producer Carol Rosenstein and director Bruce Gowers of Together Again Video Productions. The duo had produced and directed over 100 music videos for Warner Bros. Records and took their idea of music videos for children to the record label. Warner Brothers funded the first video, "A Day at Old MacDonald's Farm". Shortly thereafter, a three-way partnership formed between TAVP, WBR and View-Master Video, with TAVP responsible for production and WBR and View-Master responsible for distribution to video and music stores, and toy stores respectively.

== Development ==
The home video series was launched with four Kidsongs "Music Video Stories" being announced at New York's Toy Fair in February 1986. "A Day at Old MacDonald's Farm" was one of those first four and has sold over 4 million copies and won the Vira Award. Each half-hour video featured around 10 songs in a music video style production starring a group of children known as the "Kidsongs Kids". They sing and dance their way through well-known children's songs, nursery rhymes and covers of pop hits from the '50s, '60s, '70s and '80s, all tied together by a simple story and theme.

The TAVP/WBR/View-Master Video partnership (View-Master was acquired by Tyco Toys in 1989) produced sixteen Kidsongs videotapes. In 1995, WBR and TAVP bought out Tyco's distribution rights, then "Let's Put on a Show" and "Baby Animal Songs" were released in 1996 by WarnerVision Entertainment, another division of Time Warner. In 1997, TAVP acquired Time Warner's rights to Kidsongs, assuming sole ownership of the franchise.

Later in 1997, TAVP entered into a distribution/production agreement with Sony Wonder, having admired Sony's revitalization of Sesame Street's home video and music products. TAVP and Sony Wonder co-produced four more titles: "I Can Dance!", "I Can Do It!" and two "Adventures in Biggleland" specials also broadcast in television syndication. In 2002, distribution rights migrated to Image Entertainment (later RLJE Films), which continues to distribute the videos.

In 2021, Kidsongs released the new Christmas Songs for Kids, Volume 2 album with new Christmas songs.

== Notable members ==
- Meredith Bishop (1985)
- Shawn Harrison (1986)
- Devyn Puett (1986–1987 and 1990)
- Ryan Bollman (1986)
- Raquel Alessi (1990)
- Jensen Karp (1990)
- Josh Keaton (1990)
- Veena Goel (1990)
- Alexandra Picatto (1993–1995)
- Galen Hooks (1994)
- Lynsey Bartilson (1994–1995)

== Home videos ==
Twenty-five Kidsongs "Music Video Stories" were released between 1986 and 1998, encompassing more than 200 public domain, covered, and original songs, and featuring a variety of topics of interest to kids: animals, birthdays, the zoo, sports, summer camp, fantasy, vehicles and general silliness. 14 have been certified platinum by the RIAA, with 5 of them having sold more than 2 million copies. As of now, the videos have sold over 19.5 million copies.

No.	Title	Original release date
1	"A Day at Old MacDonald's Farm"	April 1986
Songs: "Old MacDonald Had a Farm", "Shortenin' Bread", "Here We Go Round the Mulberry Bush", "Mary Had a Little Lamb", "This Old Man", "Skip to My Lou", "Take Me Out to the Ball Game", "John Jacob Jingleheimer Schmidt", "She'll Be Comin' Round the Mountain", "Twinkle, Twinkle, Little Star"
2	"I'd Like to Teach the World to Sing"	April 1986
Songs: "I'd Like to Teach the World to Sing" (United States) (The New Seekers), "Funiculì, Funiculà" (Italy), "Did You Ever See a Lassie?" (Scotland), "London Bridge" (England), "Frère Jacques/Are You Sleeping" (France), "Kumbaya" (Ivory Coast), "Waltzing Matilda" (Australia), "Sakura Sakura" (Japan), "Los Pollitos" (Mexico), "Day-O (Banana Boat Song)" (Jamaica) (Harry Belafonte)
3	"Good Night, Sleep Tight"	April 1986
Songs: Playground at the Park Medley ("Ring Around the Rosie", "Pat-a-Cake", "A-Tisket, A-Tasket", "Let Us Dance, Let Us Play"), "Our House" (Crosby, Stills, Nash & Young), "Tomorrow is a Dream Away", "The Unicorn" (The Irish Rovers), "St. Judy's Comet" (Paul Simon), "Hush, Little Baby", "Lullaby and Goodnight" (Johannes Brahms), "All the Pretty Little Horses", "Good Night" (The Beatles)
4	"Cars, Boats, Trains and Planes"	April 1986
Songs: "Car Car Song" (Woody Guthrie), "Daylight Train", "Up and Down, Round and Round", "Row, Row, Row Your Boat", "I Got Wheels", "Up, Up and Away" (The Fifth Dimension), "Where, Oh Where Has My Little Dog Gone?" (Septimus Winner), "I Like Trucks", "U.S. Air Force (Wild Blue Yonder)", "The Bus Song"
5	"Sing Out, America!"	August 25, 1986
Songs: "Yankee Doodle Dandy", "America's Heroes", "Home on the Range", "I've Been Working on the Railroad", "Oh, Susannah!", "Deep in the Heart of Texas" (Perry Como), "There's a Hole in My Bucket", "Turkey in the Straw", "If I Had a Hammer" (Trini Lopez), "You're a Grand Old Flag", "Living in the U.S.A." (Chuck Berry) Note: This video was rebranded as "Home on the Range" in 1990 and "Yankee Doodle Dandy" in 2002.
6	"A Day with the Animals"	August 25, 1986
Songs: "Bingo", "Do Your Ears Hang Low?", "Little Bo Peep", "Why Don't You Write Me?" (Simon and Garfunkel), "Rockin' Robin" (Bobby Day), "Water World", "The Wanderer" (Dion DiMucci), "Harmony", Pet Store Medley ("How Much is That Doggie in the Window?", "Little Duckie Duddle", "Hickory Dickory Dock", "Itsy Bitsy Spider")
7	"What I Want to Be"	September 7, 1987
Songs: "What Do You Want to Be?", "Sea Cruise" (Frankie Ford), "Drivin' My Life Away" (Eddie Rabbitt), School Medley ("One, Two, Buckle My Shoe", "School Days", "The Alphabet Song"), "I Wanna Be a Fireman", "The Candy Man" (Leslie Bricusse and Anthony Newley), "Them Bones", "Mr. Policeman", "Rodeo Rider", "Act Naturally" (The Buckaroos)
8	"The Wonderful World of Sports"	September 7, 1987
Songs: "It's Not If You Win or Lose", "Practice Makes Perfect", "Bend Me, Shape Me" (The American Breed), "I Get Around" (The Beach Boys), "Over the River and Through the Woods", "Footloose" (Kenny Loggins), "Rah, Rah, Sis Boom Bah", "Catch a Wave" (The Beach Boys), "Centerfield" (John Fogerty), "You Know That You Can Do It" Note: This video was rebranded as "Let's Play Ball!" in 1990.
9	"A Day at the Circus"	November 2, 1987
Songs: "The Circus is Coming to Town", "Polly Wolly Doodle", "Strolling Through the Park", "The Sabre Dance" (instrumental underscore), "Put On a Happy Face" (Charles Strouse and Lee Adams), "The Ringmaster Song", "The Man on the Flying Trapeze", "The Lion Tamer", "If You're Happy and You Know It", "Entry of the Gladiators" (instrumental underscore)
10	"A Day at Camp"	April 24, 1990
Songs: "The More We Get Together", "The Caissons Go Rolling Along", "Fishin' Blues" (Taj Mahal), "On Top of Spaghetti", Campfire Medley ("99 Bottles of Pop", "Pop Goes the Weasel" "Found a Peanut", "The Ants Go Marching"), "Boom, Boom, Ain't It Great to Be Crazy?", Animal Medley ("The Animal Fair", "Little Bunny Foo Foo", "Pussycat, Pussycat", "Baa, Baa, Black Sheep", "The Old Gray Mare", "I Had a Little Rooster"), "Whistle While You Work" (Frank Churchill and Larry Morey), "The Hokey Pokey", "When the Saints Go Marching In"
11	"Ride the Roller Coaster"	April 24, 1990
Songs: "Let's Twist Again" (Chubby Checker), "Whole Lotta Shakin' Goin' On" (Jerry Lee Lewis), "Little Deuce Coupe" (The Beach Boys), "Fast Food", "Here We Go Loopty Loo", "Anything You Can Do" (Irving Berlin), "Splish Splash" (Bobby Darin), "A Pirate's Life", "We're Gonna Get Wet", "1812 Overture" (instrumental underscore)
12	"Very Silly Songs"	March 12, 1991
Songs: "The Name Game" (Shirley Ellis), "Down by the Bay", "Rig-a-Jig-Jig", "Mail Myself to You" (Woody Guthrie), "Purple People Eater" (Sheb Wooley), "Fiddle-I-Dee", "The Thing" (Phil Harris), "Jim Along Josie", "Michael Finnegan", "Do the Silly Willy"
13	"A Day of Fun"	November 12, 1991
A compilation of songs from previous stories, initially only available from a Sealtest ice cream mail-in offer. Songs: "Bingo" ("A Day with the Animals"), "I Got Wheels" ("Cars, Boats, Trains and Planes"), "Old MacDonald Had a Farm" ("A Day at Old MacDonald's Farm"), "Day-O (Banana Boat Song)" ("I'd Like to Teach the World to Sing"), "The Circus Is Coming to Town" ("A Day at the Circus"), "We're Gonna Get Wet" ("Ride the Roller Coaster"), "Down by the Bay" ("Very Silly Songs"), "Them Bones" ("What I Want to Be"), "I've Been Working on the Railroad" ("Home on the Range"), "When the Saints Go Marching In" ("A Day at Camp"), "The More We Get Together" ("A Day at Camp")
14	"We Wish You a Merry Christmas"	October 27, 1992
Songs: "Deck the Halls", "All I Want for Christmas Is My Two Front Teeth", "Frosty the Snowman", "Jingle Bells", "Santa, Please Don't Forget Me", "If I Had a Pony for Christmas", "The Twelve Days of Christmas", "Rudolph the Red-Nosed Reindeer", "Santa Claus is Coming to Town", "We Wish You a Merry Christmas" Note: The album version of this video includes more Christmas songs that weren't used in the video.
15	"Play Along Songs"	May 25, 1993
Songs: "Come on and Join in the Game" (Pete Seeger), "Fooba Wooba John" (Burl Ives), "Down by the Station", "Oh, Dear, What Should the Color Be?", "Bumpin' Up and Down (in My Little Red Wagon)", "Three Little Fishies", "And the Green Grass Grows All Around", "Chickie Chickie Beat", "Ten in the Bed (Roll Over)", "Come On and Join the Band" (original)
16	"If We Could Talk to the Animals"	October 8, 1993
Songs: "Hound Dog" (Elvis Presley), "If We Could Talk to the Animals" (Leslie Bricusse), "Five Little Monkeys", "Raccoon & Possum", "Over in the Meadow", "The Bear Went Over the Mountain", "The Farmer in the Dell", "The Kicking Mule", "The Old Hen", "See You Later, Alligator" (Bill Haley and his Comets)
17	"Billy Biggle's Favorite Songs"	1994
After Billy Biggle lands in the kids' backyard, they reminisce about videos they've made; Billy can magically replay his favorites. Songs: "Down by the Bay" ("Very Silly Songs"), "Jim Along Josie" ("Very Silly Songs"), "Five Little Monkeys" ("If We Could Talk to the Animals"), "Bingo" ("A Day with the Animals"), "Michael Finnegan" ("Very Silly Songs"), "We're Gonna Get Wet" ("Ride the Roller Coaster"), "Take Me Out to the Ball Game" ("A Day at Old MacDonald's Farm"), "Down by the Station" ("Play Along Songs"), "I've Been Working on the Railroad" ("Home on the Range"), "Raccoon & Possum" ("If We Could Talk to the Animals"), "The Farmer in the Dell" ("If We Could Talk to the Animals"), "Old MacDonald Had a Farm" ("A Day at Old MacDonald's Farm") Note: This video was originally released in limited quantities as a tie-in to The Kidsongs Television Show and was re-released as "My Favorite Songs" in 2002.
18	"Country Sing-Along"	February 28, 1995
Songs: "Swingin'" (John Anderson), "On the Road Again" (Willie Nelson), "Watch Our Oats and Barley Grow", "The Old Chisholm Trail", "Born to Be a Cowboy", "Buffalo Gals", "Nashville Cats" (The Lovin' Spoonful), "Achy Breaky Heart" (Billy Ray Cyrus), "Country Kid", "Happy Trails to You" Note: This is the first video with the Biggles; Billy Biggle was first introduced in the previous video.
19	"Boppin' with the Biggles"	February 28, 1995
Songs: "Walkin' the Dog" (Rufus Thomas), "Head, Shoulders, Knees and Toes", "Alley Cat" (Bent Fabric), "La Bamba" (Ritchie Valens), "Put Your Little Foot Right There", "The Loco-Motion" (Little Eva), "Little Red Caboose", "Peppermint Twist" (Joey Dee and the Starliters), "Rock Around the Clock" (Bill Haley and his Comets), "Paw Paw Patch"
20	"Let's Put on a Show"	January 30, 1996
Songs: "We'll Put on a Show", "Personality" (Lloyd Price), "It's Magic", "Blue Suede Shoes" (Elvis Presley), "Mr. Bass Man" (Johnny Cymbal), "By the Light of the Silvery Moon" (Gus Edwards), "Me and My Shadow" (Peggy Lee), "The Best Dog in the World", "It's Time for the Show", "Give My Regards to Broadway" (George M. Cohan)
21	"Baby Animal Songs"	January 30, 1996
Songs: "The Petting Zoo", "Wooly Bully" (Sam the Sham and the Pharaohs), "'A' You're Adorable" (Perry Como and The Fontane Sisters), "Jeepers Creepers", "Yes! We Have No Bananas" (Louis Prima), "Side by Side" (Kay Starr), "Oh, You Beautiful Doll" (Al Jolson), "Five Little Animals", "Does Your Chewing Gum Lose Its Flavour (On the Bedpost Overnight?)" (Lonnie Donegan), "The Way You Walk"
22	"I Can Dance!"	February 24, 1998
Songs: "I Can Dance!", "Dancing in the Street" (Martha and the Vandellas), "Charleston" (James P. Johnson), "Don't You Just Love to Waltz?", "Twist and Shout" (The Beatles), "Mexican Hat Dance", "The Yellow Rose of Texas", "Come on and Conga", "Barefootin'" (Robert Parker), "Mashed Potato Time" (Dee Dee Sharp), "At the Hop" (Danny and the Juniors)
23	"I Can Do It!"	February 24, 1998
Songs: "I Can Do It!", "Look What I Can Do", "How Does Your Garden Grow?", "All Shook Up" (Elvis Presley), "C'mon and Swim" (Bobby Freeman), "Peanut Butter", "Button Up Your Overcoat" (Helen Kane), "Bicycle Built for Two", "In the Good Old Summertime", "Boogie Woogie Bugle Boy" (The Andrews Sisters), "The Best Sandcastle"
24	"Adventures in Biggleland: Meet the Biggles"	August 11, 1998 (television)
Songs: "Adventures in Biggleland", "Consider Yourself" (Lionel Bart), "East Side, West Side (The Sidewalks of New York)", "Alouette", "Alexander's Ragtime Band" (Irving Berlin), "Let's Rock it Up", "The Muffin Man", "Harrigan" (George M. Cohan), "Let's Be Silly", "Ta-Ra-Ra-Boom-Dee-Ay"
25	"Adventures in Biggleland: Billy's Birthday"	September 18, 1998 (television)
Songs: "Adventures in Biggleland", "I'm a Big Boy Now", "Playmate", "Pat-a-Cake", "Go In and Out the Window", "Jump-Jump, Turn Around, Start Again", "Simon Says", "Limbo Rock" (Chubby Checker), "Happy Birthday to You", "You Can't Sit Down" (The Dovells)

== Television series ==
The Kidsongs Television Show
- Genre: Children's music
- Created by: Carol Rosenstein; Bruce Gowers
- Written by: Carol Rosenstein
- Directed by: Bruce Gowers
- Opening theme: "We Want Our Kidsongs"
- Ending theme: "We Want Our Kidsongs"
- Composer: Michael Lloyd
- Country of origin: United States
- Original language: English
- No. of seasons: 4
- No. of episodes: 96

Production
- Executive producers: Carol Rosenstein; Bruce Gowers
- Producer: Carol Rosenstein
- Camera setup: Multiple-camera setup
- Production companies: Together Again Productions; Warner Bros. Records (seasons 1–3); Sony Wonder (season 4); Orbis Communications (season 1); WTTW National Productions (seasons 2–4)

Original release
- Network: Syndication
- Release: September 19, 1987 – September 26, 1997

The Kidsongs Television Show debuted on September 19, 1987, with 26 half-hour episodes distributed by Orbis Entertainment. The half-hour, live-action episodes featured the Kidsongs Kids running their own TV show in a top 8 countdown-style show, featuring music videos from the Kidsongs home video series. It ran on network affiliates, primarily on Saturday mornings. The series aired for two years in syndication, then was rerun on The Disney Channel in 1990. It won the prestigious Excellence in Children's Programming Award from ACT. The 1987–88 series was titled The Kidsongs TV Show.

In 1994, a new version of the television series was developed by Rosenstein and produced in conjunction with Chicago public television station WTTW for 30 minutes and distributed by American Public Television to public television stations nationally. The Kidsongs Television Show reached 89 percent of households by 1998. Many of the original Kidsongs videos were used in the public television series, along with new educational content and in-studio guests. The kids are joined by the fantasy characters Billy and Ruby Biggle and their magical friends from Biggleland. The Biggles help the children resolve their problems and concerns in a comforting, kind way. They address age-appropriate issues, such as not wanting to share, jealousy, friendship, telling the truth and patience.

Seasons one through four of The Kidsongs Television Show totaled 96 episodes. It ran on public television for seven years, winning critical acclaim. Currently, fifteen episodes of The Kidsongs Television Show are available on DVD, and the series is also available in its entirety on digital download through iTunes and Amazon Video.

=== Series overview ===
Season	Episodes	Originally released	
Season	Episodes	First released	Last released
1	26	September 19, 1987	March 12, 1988
2	30	April 4, 1994	May 13, 1994
3	20	October 2, 1995	October 27, 1995
4	20	September 1, 1997	September 26, 1997

=== Season 1 (1987–1988) ===
The hosts this season are Chris Lytton and Triskin Potter.

No. overall	No. in season	Title	Original release date
1	1	"Our First TV Show!"	September 19, 1987
2	2	"Let's Sing American Songs"	September 26, 1987
3	3	"Studio Fun"	October 3, 1987
4	4	"We've Got This Down"	October 10, 1987
5	5	"We're on a Roll"	October 17, 1987
6	6	"Classic Kid's Songs"	October 24, 1987
7	7	"What's at #1?"	October 31, 1987
8	8	"Songs & Games"	November 7, 1987
9	9	"Practice Makes Perfect"	November 14, 1987
10	10	"Let's Count 'em Down"	November 21, 1987
11	11	"Music Video Madness"	November 28, 1987
12	12	"Let's Get Moving"	December 5, 1987
13	13	"Made by Kids"	December 12, 1987
14	14	"For Kids & Starring Kids"	December 19, 1987
15	15	"It's Sing-a-Long Time!"	December 26, 1987
16	16	"It's a Kid's World"	January 2, 1988
17	17	"We Want Our Kidsongs"	January 9, 1988
18	18	"Kidsongs Rocks"	January 16, 1988
19	19	"What's Climbing Up the Charts?"	January 23, 1988
20	20	"Hits, Classics & Sing-Alongs"	January 30, 1988
21	21	"Join the Sing-Along Fun"	February 6, 1988
22	22	"School Days"	February 13, 1988
23	23	"We Love Our Kidsongs"	February 20, 1988
24	24	"Livin' in the USA"	February 27, 1988
25	25	"Counting Down the Chart"	March 5, 1988
26	26	"It's a Wrap!"	March 12, 1988

=== Season 2 (1994) ===
The hosts this season are Christian Buenaventura and Alexandra Picatto (credited as Alexandra Palm). This is also the debut of Kidsongs' new mascots, the Biggles (though Ruby would appear in later episodes).

No. overall	No. in season	Title	Original release date
27	1	"Alligator on the Loose"	April 4, 1994
28	2	"A Fish Story"	April 5, 1994
29	3	"Billy's Tummy Ache"	April 6, 1994
30	4	"Gentlemen, Start Your Engines!"	April 7, 1994
31	5	"The Mail Must Go Through"	April 8, 1994
32	6	"Teamwork"	April 11, 1994
33	7	"Where in the World is Billy Biggle?"	April 12, 1994
34	8	"Katie's Little Lie"	April 13, 1994
35	9	"Just a Little Magic"	April 14, 1994
36	10	"Kevin's Raffle Tickets"	April 15, 1994
37	11	"Just a Little Bit of History"	April 18, 1994
38	12	"Circus Day"	April 19, 1994
39	13	"I Can't Play Sports"	April 20, 1994
40	14	"A Community Assignment"	April 21, 1994
41	15	"Dinosaur Day"	April 22, 1994
42	16	"Around the World in 30 Minutes"	April 25, 1994
43	17	"Megan's Bad Day"	April 26, 1994
44	18	"Safety First"	April 27, 1994
45	19	"Recycled TV"	April 28, 1994
46	20	"Professor Majorchord's Music Lesson"	April 29, 1994
47	21	"Change for the Better"	May 2, 1994
48	22	"Weather Biggle"	May 3, 1994
49	23	"Olympian Dreams"	May 4, 1994
50	24	"Wild West Fever"	May 5, 1994
51	25	"Responsibility"	May 6, 1994
52	26	"Birthday Blues"	May 9, 1994
53	27	"Aviation Adventures"	May 10, 1994
54	28	"Sign Language Communication"	May 11, 1994
55	29	"I Need a Little Pasta"	May 12, 1994
56	30	"A Kidsongs Kid's Best Friend"	May 13, 1994

=== Season 3 (1995) ===
The hosts this season are Aaron Harvey, Alexandra Picatto (credited as Alexandra Palm), and Lynsey Bartilson (only in two episodes) with the Biggles.

No. overall	No. in season	Title	Original release date
57	1	"Transportation"	October 2, 1995
58	2	"It's Showtime"	October 3, 1995
59	3	"Man's Best Friend"	October 4, 1995
60	4	"We're Dancing Now"	October 5, 1995
61	5	"It's a Latin Life"	October 6, 1995
62	6	"Brooke's Lost Bike"	October 9, 1995
63	7	"Alex Alex Alex"	October 10, 1995
64	8	"Garage Sale"	October 11, 1995
65	9	"Here, Kitty Kitty"	October 12, 1995
66	10	"Mind Your Manners"	October 13, 1995
67	11	"I Have an Idea"	October 16, 1995
68	12	"Share and Share Alike"	October 17, 1995
69	13	"Collector's Item"	October 18, 1995
70	14	"Fiddle Me This"	October 19, 1995
71	15	"All the News That's Fit"	October 20, 1995
72	16	"Circle of Life"	October 23, 1995
73	17	"Practice, Practice, Practice"	October 24, 1995
74	18	"Reach for the Stars"	October 25, 1995
75	19	"Playing Favorites"	October 26, 1995
76	20	"They Raise Horses, Don't They?"	October 27, 1995

=== Season 4 (1997) ===
The hosts this season are Sergio Centeno and Tiffany Burton with the Biggles.

No. overall	No. in season	Title	Original release date
77	1	"All Together Now"	September 1, 1997
78	2	"Gone to the Dogs"	September 2, 1997
79	3	"Put Your Dancin' Shoes On"	September 3, 1997
80	4	"Bang Your Drum Loudly"	September 4, 1997
81	5	"When I Grow Up"	September 5, 1997
82	6	"Life's a Beach"	September 8, 1997
83	7	"It's 60's Day"	September 9, 1997
84	8	"A Doggone Great Day"	September 10, 1997
85	9	"Working Together"	September 11, 1997
86	10	"Under the Sea"	September 12, 1997
87	11	"Dedication and Practice"	September 15, 1997
88	12	"We Are Family"	September 16, 1997
89	13	"Let's Look It Up"	September 17, 1997
90	14	"Brady "Safety" Kimball"	September 18, 1997
91	15	"Throwing Curve Balls"	September 19, 1997
92	16	"Animal's Galore"	September 22, 1997
93	17	"Billy's Doctor Visit"	September 23, 1997
94	18	"Aloha, Biggleland"	September 24, 1997
95	19	"Monster Truck Day"	September 25, 1997
96	20	"Dream On"	September 26, 1997
