= Cumulative song =

Simple song form with repetitive and linked verses

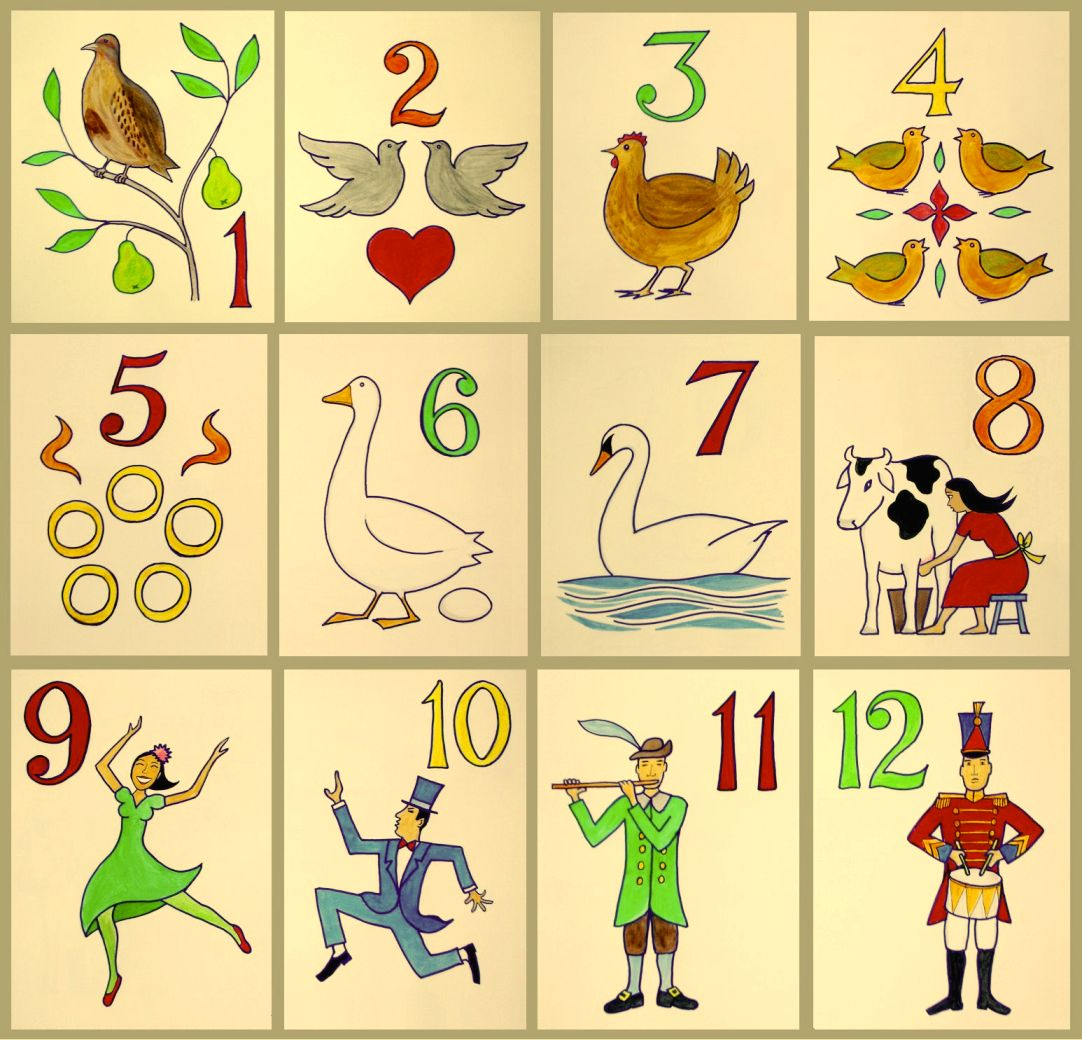
"The Twelve Days of Christmas" is a cumulative song.

A cumulative song is a song with a simple verse structure modified by progressive addition so that each verse is longer than the verse before. Cumulative songs are popular for group singing, in part because they require relatively little memorization of lyrics, and because remembering the previous verse to concatenate it to form the current verse can become a kind of game.

== Structure ==
Typically, the lyrics take the form of a stanza of at least two lines. In each verse, the text of the first line introduces a new item, and the other line uses the words to begin a list which includes items from all the preceding verses. The item is typically a new phrase (simultaneously a group of words and a musical phrase) to a line in a previous stanza.

The two lines are often separated by refrains. Many cumulative songs also have a chorus.

A musical structure that could describe it might be:

A
BA
CBA
DCBA
EDCBA
.
.
.

=== Songs with two-line stanzas ===
One of the most well-known examples of a cumulative song is the Christmas song "The Twelve Days of Christmas", which uses a two-line stanza, where the second line is cumulative, as follows:

On the first day of Christmas, my true love sent (or "gave") to me
A partridge in a pear tree.

On the second day of Christmas my true love sent to me
Two turtle doves and a partridge in a pear tree.

On the third day of Christmas, my true love sent to me
Three french hens, two turtle doves and a partridge in a pear tree.

and so on until

On the twelfth day of Christmas, my true love sent to me
Twelve drummers drumming, eleven pipers piping, ten lords a-leaping, nine ladies dancing, eight maids a-milking, seven swans a-swimming, six geese a-laying, five gold(en) rings, four calling birds, three french hens, two turtle doves and a partridge in a pear tree.

The first gift (the partridge) is always sung to a "coda melody" phrase. For the first four verses, the additional gifts are all sung to a repeated standard melodic phrase. In the fifth verse, a different melody, with a change of tempo, is introduced for the five gold(en) rings; and from this point on the first five gifts are always sung to a set of varied melodic phrases (with the partridge retaining its original coda phrase). Thence forward, the wording of each new gift is sung to the original standard melodic phrase before returning to the five gold(en) rings.

=== Songs with refrains ===
In many songs, an item is introduced in the first line of each stanza and extends the list in another line. An example is "The Barley Mow" (Roud 944):

Here's good luck to the pint pot,
Good luck to the barley mow
Jolly good luck to the pint pot,
Good luck to the barley mow

Oh the pint pot, half a pint, gill pot, half a gill, quarter gill, nipperkin, and a round bowl
Here's good luck, good luck, good luck to the barley mow

The second verse substitutes a larger drink measure in the first line. In the second line the new measure heads the list and is sung to the same musical phrase as pint pot.

Here's good luck to the quart pot,
Good luck to the barley mow
Jolly good luck to the quart pot,
Good luck to the barley mow

Oh the quart pot, pint pot, half a pint, gill pot, half a gill, quarter gill, nipperkin, and a round bowl
Here's good luck, good luck, good luck to the barley mow

One version of the final line and refrain is:

Oh the company, the brewer, the drayer, the slavey, the daughter, the landlady, the landlord, the barrel, the half-barrel, the gallon, the half-gallon, the quart pot, pint pot, half a pint, gill pot, half a gill, quarter gill, nipperkin, and a round bowl
Here's good luck, good luck, good luck to the barley mow

Alan Lomax recorded Jack French singing The Barley Mow at the Blaxhall Ship, a famous singing pub in Suffolk, in 1953. This recording is available online at the Cultural Equity website.

=== Songs with a chorus ===
A chorus (often with its own refrain) may be added to the stanzas as in "The Rattlin' Bog" (Roud 129):

Hi ho, the rattlin' bog,
The bog down in the valley-o,
Hi ho, the rattlin' bog,
The bog down in the valley-o.

1. Now in the bog there was a tree,
A rare tree, a rattlin' tree,
The tree in the bog,
And the bog down in the valley-o.

(CHORUS)

2. And on that tree there was a branch,
A rare branch, a rattlin' branch,
The branch on the tree, and the tree in the bog,
And the bog down in the valley-o.

(CHORUS)

One version of the final line+refrain is:

The feather on the wing, and the wing on the bird, and the bird on the nest, and the nest on the twig, and the twig on the branch, and the branch on the tree, and the tree in the bog,
And the bog down in the valley-o.

Each phrase is sung to the same two-note melody.

Hamish Henderson recorded William Sinclair Mitchell, Agnes Mitchell and Agnes Mitchell singing "The Rattling Bog" in 1979. The recording is available on line on the Tobar an Dualchais – Kist o Riches website.

Jim Carroll and Pat McKenzie recorded Pat McNamara singing "The Bog Down in the Valley" in Kilshanny, in 1975. The recording is available online on the Clare County Library website.

== Cumulative songs in languages other than English ==
Yiddish folk music contains many prominent examples of cumulative songs, including "?װאָס װעט זײַן אַז משיח װעט קומען" and "מה אספּרה," or "What Will Happen When the Messiah Comes?" and "Who Can Recall" (a Yiddish version of the Passover song "Echad Mi Yodea").;;

The Passover seder contains two cumulative songs: "Echad Mi Yodea" in Hebrew, and "Chad Gadya" in Aramaic.

Italian folk Catholicism has "Le dodici parole della verita" ("From the One God to the Twelve Apostles").

== Song examples ==
- "Father Abraham Had Many Sons"
- "The Twelve Days of Christmas"
- "The Barley Mow"
- "Chad Gadya"
- "Echad Mi Yodea"
- "Alouette"
- "The Austrian Yodeler (Once An Austrian Went Yodeling)"
- "When I Build My House" by Parachute Express"
- "Birthday Cake" by Parachute Express
- "Children, Go Where I Send Thee"
- "The Court of King Caractacus" by Rolf Harris
- "Don't Be Anything Less Than Anything You Can Be" from the musical Snoopy
- "Du Hast" is partially cumulative; it's a fairly popular German industrial song, making its cumulative parts somewhat novel
- "Eh, Cumpari!"
- "Getta Loada Toad" from the musical A Year with Frog and Toad
- "Grandmother's Farm" by Hap Palmer on his album Witches Brew
- "The Green Grass Grew All Around"
- "Green Grow the Rushes, O"
- "Guerres de clocher" by Québec Redneck Bluegrass Project
- "The Herring Song" (or "Herring's Heads")
- "The House at the Top of the Tree" by They Might Be Giants on their album No!
- "I Bought Me a Cat", known by various other titles, such as "My Cock Crew" and "Barnyard Song"
- "I Am a Fine Musician" from two episodes of the Dick Van Dyke Show
- "I Have a Song to Sing, O" from Gilbert & Sullivan's opera The Yeomen of the Guard
- "Jouer dehors" by Jérôme 50 & Julyan, sung by Passe-Partout
- "Katootje" Dutch traditional sung by Wim Sonneveld in 1955.
- "Langt ud' i Skoven", a traditional Danish folk song played by Dreamers' Circus and DR BørneKoret on their album Langt ud' i Skoven from 2022
- "Moshpit à St-Dilon" by Margaret Tracteur
- "Most Beautiful Leg of the Mallard", sung by Henry Mitchelmore on The Voice of the People vol. 07
- "The Music Man"
- "Must Be Santa", a Christmas song popularized by Mitch Miller
- "My Hand on My Head"
- Some versions of "Old King Cole"
- "Old McDonald Had a Farm"
- "One Little Coyote" by Riders in the Sky on their album Harmony Ranch
- "Pat the Cat" by Don Spencer
- "Pumpernickel Bread" by Barney & Friends
- "Prologue" from Natasha, Pierre & The Great Comet of 1812 makes use of the format to familiarise the audience with the cast of the musical.
- "The Rattlin' Bog"
- "Le reel alcalinisant" by Québec Redneck Bluegrass Project
- "Rig-a-Jig-Jig"
- "The Schnitzelbank Song"
- "Song of Love" from the musical Once Upon a Mattress
- "Star Trekkin'", a 1987 parody song by The Firm
- "There Was an Old Lady Who Swallowed a Fly"
- "There's a Hole in the Bottom of the Sea"
- "Hole in the Bottom of My Brain" by AJR
- "Today is Monday"
- "White Pyjamas" by Franciscus Henri
- "Il Pulcino Pio" and its various language versions
- "Alla fiera dell'est", an Italian song by Angelo Branduardi and its English version "Highdown Fair"
- "One Man Went To Mow" (Roud 143).
- "To Kokoraki" (as sung by Donald Swann on Flanders and Swann's "At the Drop of a Hat") is a Greek counting song about animals.
- "Oh Sir Jasper!" is the opposite of a cumulative song, in which words are successively omitted from the chorus each time it is sung.
- "The Camping Song", from the Noddy episode "Twinkle, Twinkle, Little Goblins"
- "Why We Build the Wall" by Anaïs Mitchell
- "La feria de Cepillín", by the Mexican clown and singer Cepillín
- "A-benn dilun..." ("On Monday...") also known as "Kokerikero", a Breton folk counting song about animals
- "Mountain People" by Super Furry Animals
- "What's in There Inside This Egg?", by the Brazilian writer, poet and musician Marcelo Aceti
- "A Velha a Fiar", Brazilian folk song
- "Roll Up the Map", from Jake and the Neverland Pirates
- "Ajde da si rečime edna pesna (Bilbil rano pee)", Macedonian song by Vojo Stojanovski

== See also ==
- Circular tale
- Cumulative tale
- Announcer's test
- Round (music)
- The Complexity of Songs
- Quadratic Time
