= Children, Go Where I Send Thee =

Afro-American spiritual song

- Genre: Christmas, spiritual, gospel
- Language: English

Recording
- Performed by the Singing Sergeants of the United States Air Force Band: file; help

"Children, Go Where I Send Thee" (alternatively "Children, Go Where I Send You" or variations thereof, also known as "The Holy Baby", "Little Bitty Baby", or "Born in Bethlehem") is a traditional African-American spiritual song. Among the many different versions of the song, a defining feature is the cumulative structure, with each number (typically up to 12 or 10) accompanied by a biblical reference. Today, many Americans know it as a Christmas carol.

== Lyrics ==
1. Children, go where I send thee
How shall I send thee?
I'm gonna send thee one by one:
One for the little bitty baby. (Note: Sometimes followed by "Was born by the Virgin Mary, Was wrapped in the hollow of a clawhorn, Was laid in the hollow a manger")
Born, born
Born in Bethlehem.

2. Children, go where I send thee
How shall I send thee?
I'm gonna send thee two by two:
Two for Paul and Silas,
One for the little bitty baby.
Born, born
Born in Bethlehem.

3. Children, go where I send thee
How shall I send thee?
I'm gonna send thee three by three:
Three for the Hebrew children,
Two for Paul and Silas,
One for the little bitty baby.
Born, born
Born in Bethlehem.

4. Four for the four that stood at the door... (Note: Or "that come knockin' at the door")
5. Five for the gospel preachers... (Note: Or "the gospel writers")
6. Six for the six that never got fixed... (Note: Or "that couldn't get fixed")
7. Seven for the seven that never got to heaven... (Note: Or "that came down from heaven")
8. Eight for the eight that stood at the gate...
9. Nine for the nine all dressed so fine...
10. Ten for the ten commandments...
11. Eleven for the eleven deriders...
12. Twelve for the twelve Apostles... (Note: Or "the twelve Disciples")

== Origins ==
"Children, Go Where I Send Thee"
Lone singer, singing the song acapella.

The song's origins are uncertain; however, its nearest known relative is the English folk song "The Twelve Apostles." Both songs are listed in the Roud Folk Song Index as #133. Parallel features in the two songs' cumulative structure and lyrics (cumulating to 12 loosely biblical references) make this connection apparent. While "The Twelve Apostles" began appearing in English folk song collections in the mid-eighteen hundreds, the song's origins likely span back much further. Possible earlier points of origin include the traditional Yiddish Passover song "Echad Mi Yodea," which was first documented in the 16th century.

In 1908 in Gloucestershire, composer Percy Grainger used a phonogram to capture the earliest known sound recordings of "The Twelve Apostles." From 1908 to 1917, folklorist Cecil Sharp transcribed multiple versions of "The Twelve Apostles" in Appalachia, providing evidence of the song's propagation into the American South.

In 1934, folklorists John Avery Lomax and Alan Lomax travelled to Bellwood Labor Camp in Atlanta, Georgia, as part of a field recording trip. This trip produced the earliest known version of the tune to be recorded in North America. Sung by an unidentified group of African-American convicts, the recording presents a number of notable elements that begin to distinguish the song from its English ancestor. In particular, the harmonies and heterophonic texture of the performance contrast from the homophonic versions captured by Grainger and Sharp. The lyrics also show a trend toward those more commonly associated with "Children, Go Where I Send Thee." For instance, the line "Two, two, the lily-white boys clothed all in green" in Grainger's recording has become "One was the little white babe all dressed in blue" in the Bellwood Prison Camp recording.

"Children, Go Where I Send Thee" became further distanced from its English ancestor with The Golden Gate Quartet's 1937 commercial recording of the song for RCA Victor's Bluebird label. This recording features further lyrical and stylistic developments worth noting. The lines for the numbers three and two are: "Three was the Hebrew children; two was Paul and Silas." As with many spirituals, these references to imprisoned biblical figures are analogues for the enslavement of African Americans. Coupled with the recording's rhythmically driven jubilee quartet style, these features make the song a distinctly American folk tune.

While the Golden Gate Quartet were largely responsible for popularizing the song, theirs was only one of many contemporary versions. The Golden Gate Quartet themselves learned the song from another jubilee quartet, the Heavenly Gospel Singers.

== Recordings and adaptations ==
- Blues duo Dennis Crumpton & Robert Summers recorded the earliest known commercial recording of the song in 1936.
- The Weavers recorded the song in 1951.
- Ruth Crawford Seeger's inclusion of the song in her 1953 songbook, American Folksongs for Christmas, helped establish the song as a Christmas carol nationwide.
- Nina Simone recorded a version on her 1959 album The Amazing Nina Simone for the Colpix Records label.
- Langston Hughes chose the song to be the closing number in the original 1961 production of Black Nativity: A Gospel Song-Play.
- Johnny Cash's album Man In Black: Live in Denmark 1971 features a version featuring The Carter Family, The Statler Brothers, and Carl Perkins.
- Tia Blake recorded a version entitled "Jane, Jane" on her 1971 album Folk Songs & Ballads.
- Ralph Stanley recorded a version on his 1975 album Let Me Rest On A Peaceful Mountain.
- The Fairfield Four has recorded multiple versions of the song on various releases.
- A version for children appears on the 1984 Cabbage Patch Kids album "A Cabbage Patch Christmas".
- Woody Guthrie rewrote the lyrics to the song in 1949 and adapted the song to become “Come When I Call You.” Written about the ravages of war in the aftermath of World War II, the song would go unpublished until the late 90s. The Klezmatics recorded Guthrie’s version of the song on their 2006 album Wonder Wheel.
- Kenny Rogers recorded a version with Home Free on his 2015 album Once Again It’s Christmas.

Other artist to record the song include Joe and Eddie, Fred Waring and his Pennsylvanians, Mary Chapin Carpenter, Natalie Merchant, The Kingston Trio, the Blind Boys of Alabama, the Florida Boys, Mike Seeger with sisters Penny Seeger and Peggy Seeger, Peter, Paul and Mary, Ricky Skaggs, The Burns Sisters, Mandisa, Mahalia Jackson, Tennessee Ernie Ford, Audra McDonald, The Tabernacle Choir, Scala & Kolacny Brothers, Odetta, Hall and Oates, REO Speedwagon, Kenny Burrell, Nick Lowe, The Spinners, Ledisi, Colin James & The Little Big Band, Neil Diamond, Pentatonix (with Christmas-themed lyric changes), The Laurie Berkner Band, The Blenders, Sister Thea Bowman, and Clara Ward.

== See also ==
- Echad Mi Yodea
- Green Grow the Rushes, O, also known as "The Twelve Apostles"
- Dem Bones, another well-known cumulative spiritual
- Christian child's prayer § Spirituals
- List of Christmas carols
