= Very Silly Songs =

Very Silly Songs refer to:

- "Very Silly Songs", a Kidsongs 1991 video
- "Very Silly Songs", a VeggieTales 1999 video
