= There Was an Old Lady Who Swallowed a Fly =

Cumulative children's song

The old lady swallows a horse to catch the cow, to catch the goat, to catch the dog, to catch the cat, to catch the bird, to catch the spider, to catch the fly.

"There Was an Old Lady Who Swallowed a Fly" is a cumulative (repetitive, connected poetic lines or song lyrics) children's nursery rhyme and nonsensical song.

The song dates from at least the 19th century. The rhyme is documented in English author Dorothy B. King's 1946 book Happy Recollections, and in 1953 the song was recorded by Burl Ives.

Other titles for the rhyme include "There Was an Old Lady", "I Know an Old Lady Who Swallowed a Fly", "There Was an Old Woman Who Swallowed a Fly", "I Know an Old Woman Who Swallowed a Fly" and "Poor Mrs Somebody".

== Content ==
The song tells the nonsensical story of an old woman who swallows increasingly large animals, each to catch the previously swallowed animal, but dies after swallowing a horse. There are many variations of phrasing in the lyrics, especially for the description of swallowing each animal.

The earliest reference in the British Newspaper Archive to a song about a woman who swallowed a fly comes in an 1872 report in The Era about a show called Britannia's Picture Gallery at the Polytechnic. "A new comic extravaganza is here sung by Mr Buckland, being the story of 'Mrs Somebody', who might be anybody, and whose doleful fate it was to swallow a fly." It credits the lyrics to Frank W. Green and the music to Alfred Lee.

The song appears to have been a hit on the stage of the London music halls. In 1873, at Berner's Hall, in Islington, a Mr W. Freeman "caused much mirth and won cordial applause" for a recital of "Poor Mrs Somebody" who swallowed a fly. The Era, in 1879, says a Mr Howard Baker sang a song at Crowder's called "Poor Mrs Somebody" who swallowed a fly. An 1888 book records the song as involving the swallowing of a spider, a bird "and so on".

A report from 1887 in the Walthamstow and Leyton Guardian of a musical evening at Walthamstow Art School, says a recital by a Mr Blenham "fairly convulsed the audience." The Indian Daily News in 1896 also recounts how a Colonel Chatterton "convulsed the assembled infants and most of the grown-ups with an inimitable song about a lady who 'swallowed a fly'."

Dorothy B. King tells of a recital in 1943.

Our first Wren evening was a "knockout," in the spring of 1943. The Hall was so packed that men were even perched on the window ledges. No audience could possibly have been more enthusiastic or shown their appreciation in a greater degree. I am sorry I have not that first program. Third Officer Phillips and several of the other officers sat in the front row of the Rest Room, really the dressing room on concerts nights. One of the officers recited and I have never laughed so much as I did that night she told us about the woman who swallowed a fly and then swallowed a cat to eat that fly and a dog to eat the cat, and so on: her "swallows" each time were so realistic.

— Dorothy B. King, Happy Recollections (1946)

Shortly afterwards, the journal Hoosier Folklore published three versions of the story from different parts of the United States (Colorado, Georgia and Ohio) in its December 1947 edition. The editor calls it a "cumulative tale", and asks readers for information on its origins. All three versions begin with a lady swallowing the fly and end with her dying after swallowing a horse, but there are variations in what animals are swallowed and the rhymes for each animal.

The origins of the song are uncertain. It's possible it was inspired by an anecdote about the London surgeon John Abernethy which was widely reported on his death in 1831. A young woman came to seek medical help after swallowing a spider. "Mr Abernethy dextrously caught a blue-bottle fly as it fled by him, and told the patient to put it in her mouth and if she spit it out in a few moments the spider would come out with it." By the start of the 20th century, the story had mutated. According to the Glasgow Observer's telling of the "celebrated case", Abernethy suggested he should send a spider down into her lungs to catch the fly. She "declared that she felt the spider walking down her throat when Abernethy was only tickling it with a feather, and declared herself completely cured when Abernethy showed her both fly and spider in a test tube."

== Recording ==
"There Was an Old Lady Who Swallowed a Fly"

Song by Burl Ives
- Language: English
- Released: 1953
- Genre: Children's rhyme, nonsense song
- Label: Brunswick Records
- Songwriters: Rose Bonne and Alan Mills

Official audio
- "There Was an Old Lady Who Swallowed a Fly" on YouTube

In 1952, Rose Bonne (lyrics) and Canadian/English folk artist Alan Mills copyrighted a version of the song, respectively contributing lyrics and music. At that time it was entitled simply "I Know an Old Lady." A widely distributed version of the song was released on Brunswick Records in 1953, where it was sung by Burl Ives. Ives' rendition appears on his album, Folk Songs, Dramatic and Humorous—which debuted in late summer, 1953. According to the album liner notes, the song was "derived from an old ballad", rewritten by Alan Mills, and passed to Ives by Edith Fowke of CBC Radio. The 1961 illustrated book by Rose Bonne also indicates that the lyrics are hers, whereas the music was composed by Alan Mills.

== Lyrics ==
The following is one version of the lyrics to demonstrate the song's cumulative nature:

There was an old lady who swallowed a fly,
I don't know why she swallowed a fly – perhaps she'll die!

There was an old lady who swallowed a spider
That wriggled and jiggled and tickled inside her;
She swallowed the spider to catch the fly;
I don't know why she swallowed a fly – perhaps she'll die!

There was an old lady who swallowed a bird;
How absurd to swallow a bird!
She swallowed the bird to catch the spider
That wriggled and jiggled and tickled inside her,
She swallowed the spider to catch the fly;
I don't know why she swallowed a fly – perhaps she'll die!

There was an old lady who swallowed a cat;
Well, fancy that, she swallowed a cat!
She swallowed the cat to catch the bird,
She swallowed the bird to catch the spider
That wriggled and jiggled and tickled inside her,
She swallowed the spider to catch the fly;
I don't know why she swallowed a fly – perhaps she'll die!

There was an old lady that swallowed a dog;
What a hog to swallow a dog!
She swallowed the dog to catch the cat,
She swallowed the cat to catch the bird,
She swallowed the bird to catch the spider
That wriggled and jiggled and tickled inside her,
She swallowed the spider to catch the fly;
I don't know why she swallowed a fly – perhaps she'll die!

There was an old lady who swallowed a goat;
Just opened her throat and swallowed a goat!
She swallowed the goat to catch the dog,
She swallowed the dog to catch the cat,
She swallowed the cat to catch the bird,
She swallowed the bird to catch the spider
That wriggled and jiggled and tickled inside her,
She swallowed the spider to catch the fly;
I don't know why she swallowed a fly – perhaps she'll die!

There was an old lady who swallowed a cow;
I don't know how she swallowed a cow!
She swallowed the cow to catch the goat,
She swallowed the goat to catch the dog,
She swallowed the dog to catch the cat,
She swallowed the cat to catch the bird,
She swallowed the bird to catch the spider
That wriggled and jiggled and tickled inside her,
She swallowed the spider to catch the fly;
I don't know why she swallowed a fly – perhaps she'll die!

There was an old lady who swallowed a horse...
She's dead, of course!

== In popular culture ==
- In 1963, the National Film Board of Canada released a 5-minute cartoon I Know an Old Lady Who Swallowed a Fly, directed by Derek Lamb.

== See also ==
- Chad Gadya, cumulative song
- The Twelve Days of Christmas, cumulative song
- The Rattlin' Bog, cumulative song
