= Dayenu =

Song that is part of the Jewish holiday of Passover

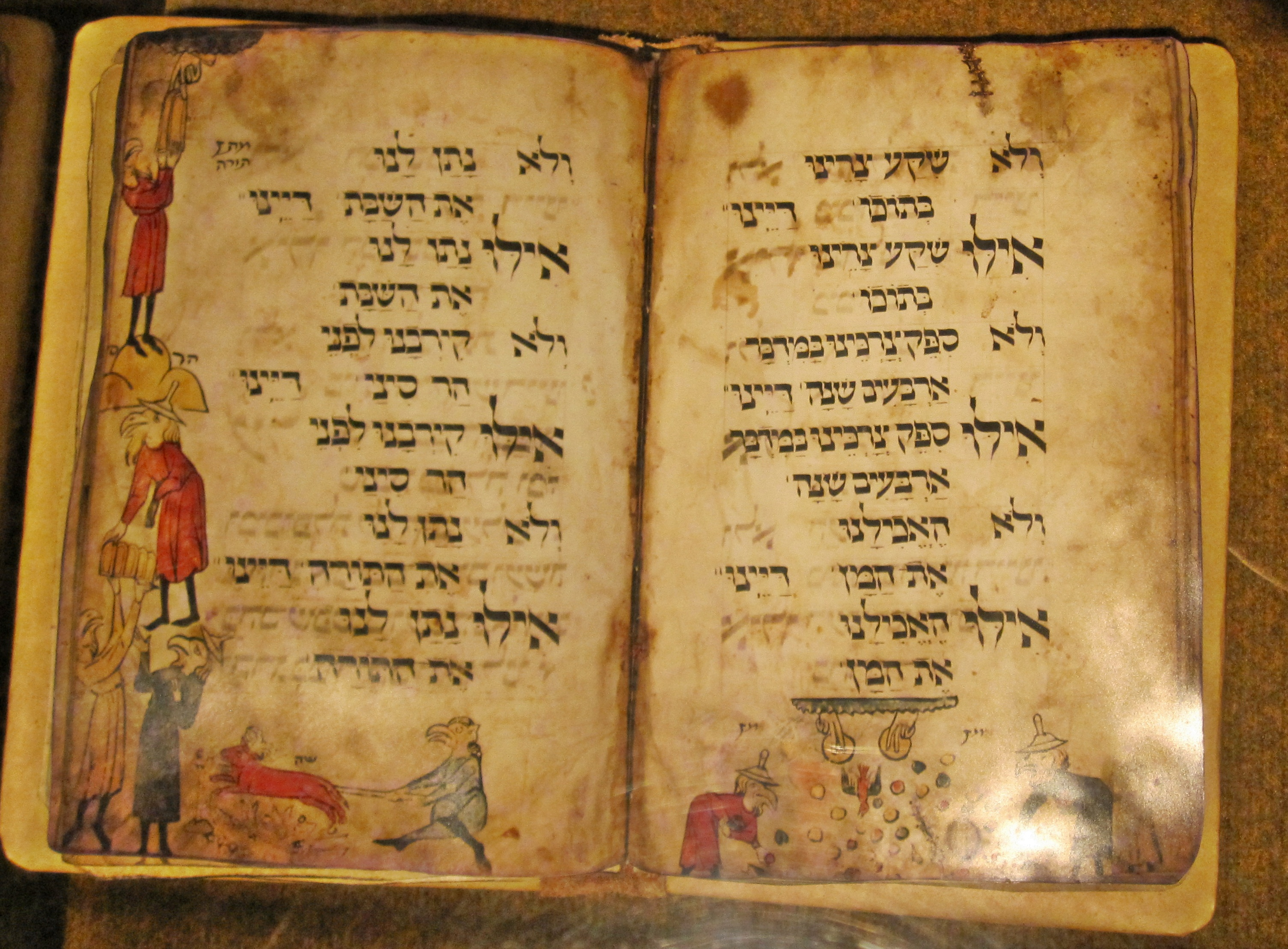
Dayenu page from Birds' Head Haggada

Dayenu (Hebrew: דַּיֵּנוּ, Dayyēnū) is a song that is part of the Jewish holiday of Passover. The word "dayenu" means approximately "it would have been enough," "it would have been sufficient," or "it would have sufficed" (day- in Hebrew is "enough," and -ēnu the first person plural suffix, "to us"). This traditional upbeat Passover song is over one thousand years old.

The earliest full text of the song occurs in the first medieval haggadah, which is part of the ninth-century Seder Rav Amram. The song is about being grateful to God for all of the gifts given to the Jewish people, such as taking them out of slavery, giving them the Torah and Shabbat, and had God only given one of the gifts, it would have still been enough. This is to show much greater appreciation for all of them. The song appears in the Haggadah after the telling of the story of the exodus and just before the explanation of Passover, matzah, and the maror.

== Stanzas ==
Dayenu has 15 stanzas representing the 15 gifts God bestowed. The first five involve freeing the Jews from slavery, the next describe the miracles He did for them, and the last five for the closeness to God He gave them. Each stanza is followed by dayenu "it would have been enough", sung repeatedly. The 15 stanzas are as follows:

=== Five stanzas of leaving slavery ===
1. If He had brought us out of Egypt
2. If He had executed justice upon the Egyptians
3. If He had executed justice upon their gods
4. If He had slain their first-born
5. If He had given to us their wealth

=== Five stanzas of miracles ===
6. If He had split the sea for us
7. If He had led us through on dry land
8. If He had drowned our oppressors
9. If He had provided for our needs in the wilderness for 40 years
10. If He had fed us manna

=== Five stanzas of being with God ===
11. If He had given us Shabbat
12. If He had led us to Mount Sinai
13. If He had given us the Torah
14. If He had brought us into the Land of Israel
15. If He built the Temple for us

== Text ==
English translation	Transliteration	Hebrew
Verse 1:
If He had brought us out from Egypt,	Illu hoṣiʾānu mimmiṣrāyim,	אִלּוּ הוֹצִיאָנוּ מִמִּצְרָיִם
and had not carried out judgments against them	wəlo ʿāśā bāhem šəp̄āṭim,	וְלֹא עָשָׂה בָּהֶם שְׁפָטִים
— it would have been enough!	dayyēnu!	דַּיֵּנוּ
Verse 2:
If He had carried out judgments against them,	Illu ʿāśā bāhem šəp̄āṭim,	אִלּוּ עָשָׂה בָּהֶם שְׁפָטִים
and not against their idols	wəlo ʿāśā bēʾlohēhem,	וְלֹא עָשָׂה בֵּאלֹהֵיהֶם
— it would have been enough!	dayyēnu!	דַּיֵּנוּ
Verse 3:
If He had destroyed their idols,	Illu ʿāśā bēlohēhem,	אִלּוּ עָשָׂה בֵּאלֹהֵיהֶם
and had not smitten their first-born	wəlo hāraḡ et̲-bək̲orēhem,	וְלֹא הָרַג אֶת בְּכוֹרֵיהֶם
— it would have been enough!	dayyēnu!	דַּיֵּנוּ
Verse 4:
If He had smitten their first-born,	Illu hāraḡ et̲-bək̲orēhem,	אִלּוּ הָרַג אֶת בְּכוֹרֵיהֶם
and had not given us their wealth	wəlo nāt̲an lānu et̲-māmonām,	וְלֹא נָתַן לָנוּ אֶת מָמוֹנָם
— it would have been enough!	dayyēnu!	דַּיֵּנוּ
Verse 5:
If He had given us their wealth,	Illu nāt̲an lānu et̲-māmonām,	אִלּוּ נָתַן לָנוּ אֶת מָמוֹנָם
and had not split the sea for us	Wəlo qāraʿ lānu et̲-hayyām,	וְלֹא קָרַע לָנוּ אֶת הַיָּם
— it would have been enough!	dayyēnu!	דַּיֵּנוּ
Verse 6:
If He had split the sea for us,	Illu qāraʿ lānu et̲-hayyām,	אִלּוּ קָרַע לָנוּ אֶת הַיָּם
and had not taken us through it on dry land	wəlo heʿeb̲irānu bət̲ok̲o beḥārāb̲ā,	וְלֹא הֶעֱבִירָנוּ בְּתוֹכוֹ בֶּחָרָבָה
— it would have been enough!	dayyēnu!	דַּיֵּנוּ
Verse 7:
If He had taken us through the sea on dry land,	Illu heʿeb̲irānu bət̲ok̲o beḥārāb̲āh,	אִלּוּ הֶעֱבִירָנוּ בְּתוֹכוֹ בֶּחָרָבָה
and had not drowned our oppressors in it	wəlo šiqaʿ ṣārēnu bət̲o,	וְלֹא שִׁקַע צָרֵינוּ בְּתוֹכוֹ
— it would have been enough!	dayyēnu!	דַּיֵּנוּ
Verse 8:
If He had drowned our oppressors in it,	Illu šiqaʿ ṣārēnu bət̲o,	אִלּוּ שִׁקַע צָרֵינוּ בְּתוֹכוֹ
and had not supplied our needs in the desert for forty years	wəlo sippēq ṣārakkēnu bammid̲bār arbāʿim šānā,	וְלֹא סִפֵּק צָרַכֵּנוּ בַּמִּדְבָּר אַרְבָּעִים שָׁנָה
— it would have been enough!	dayyēnu!	דַּיֵּנוּ
Verse 9:
If He had supplied our needs in the desert for forty years,	Illu sippēq ṣārakkēnu bammid̲bār arbāʿim šānā,	אִלּוּ סִפֵּק צָרַכֵּנוּ בַּמִּדְבָּר אַרְבָּעִים שָׁנָה
and had not fed us the manna	wəlo heʾek̲ilānu et̲-hammān,	וְלֹא הֶאֱכִילָנוּ אֶת הַמָּן
— it would have been enough!	dayyēnu!	דַּיֵּנוּ
Verse 10:
If He had fed us the manna,	Illu heʾek̲ilānu et̲-hammān,	אִלּוּ הֶאֱכִילָנוּ אֶת הַמָּן
and had not given us the Shabbat	wəlo nāt̲an lānu et̲-haššabbāt̲,	וְלֹא נָתַן לָנוּ אֶת הַשַּׁבָּת
— it would have been enough!	dayyēnu!	דַּיֵּנוּ
Verse 11:
If He had given us the Shabbat,	Illu nāt̲an lānu et̲-haššabbāt̲,	אִלּוּ נָתַן לָנוּ אֶת הַשַּׁבָּת
and had not brought us before Mount Sinai	wəlo qērəb̲ānu lip̄nē har sinay,	וְלֹא קֵרְבָנוּ לִפְנֵי הַר סִינַי
— it would have been enough!	dayyēnu!	דַּיֵּנוּ
Verse 12:
If He had brought us before Mount Sinai,	Illu qērəb̲ānu lip̄nē har sinay,	אִלּוּ קֵרְבָנוּ לִפְנֵי הַר סִינַי
and had not given us the Torah	Wəlo nāt̲an lānu et̲-hattorā,	וְלֹא נָתַן לָנוּ אֶת הַתּוֹרָה
— it would have been enough!	dayyēnu!	דַּיֵּנוּ
Verse 13:
If He had given us the Torah,	Illu nāt̲an lānu et̲-hattorā,	אִלּוּ נָתַן לָנוּ אֶת הַתּוֹרָה
and had not brought us into the land of Israel	Wəlo hik̲nisānu ləʾEreṣ Yiśrāʾēl,	וְלֹא הִכְנִיסָנוּ לְאֶרֶץ יִשְׂרָאֵל
— it would have been enough!	dayyēnu!	דַּיֵּנוּ
Verse 14:
If He had brought us into the Land of Israel,	Iklu hik̲nisānu ləʾEreṣ Yiśrāʾēl	אִלּוּ הִכְנִיסָנוּ לְאֶרֶץ יִשְׂרָאֵל
and not built for us the Holy Temple	wəlo bānā lānu ʾet̲ bēt̲-hammiqdāš,	וְלֹא בָּנָה לָנוּ אֶת בֵּית הַמִּקְדָּשׁ
— it would have been enough!	dayyēnu!	דַּיֵּנוּ

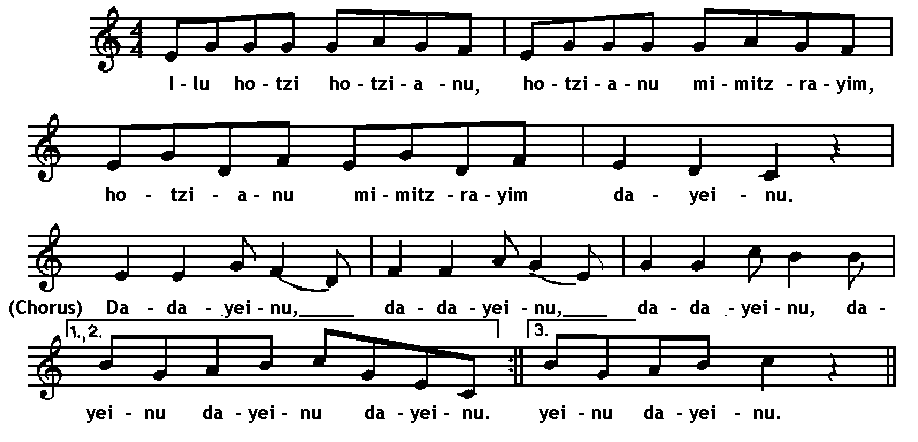
Dayenu, with transliterated lyrics and melody

== Composition date ==
The earliest full text of the song occurs in the first medieval haggadah, which is part of the ninth-century Seder Rav Amram. Although this is likely the earliest known textual witness, the composition of the song probably predates the 10th century. Scholar Israel Yuval interprets the song as a Jewish response to Christian liturgical texts, particularly the Improperia, a prayer traditionally sung on Good Friday. The Christian text accuses the Jews of ingratitude toward God, who delivered them from Egypt, only for them to repay Him by crucifying Jesus. In contrast, the song Dayenu is filled with expressions of gratitude toward God for all He has done for the people of Israel.

== Associated customs ==
Jews in Afghanistan and Iran hit each other over the head with green onions during the refrain beginning with the ninth stanza (Even if you had supplied our needs in the desert for 40 years but not provided us with manna). This may be due to a passage in Numbers 11:5–6, where the Israelites see manna and recall Egypt. "We remember the fish that we used to eat in Egypt, the cucumbers, the melons, the leeks, the onions and the garlic. Now our gullets are shriveled. There is nothing at all. Nothing but this manna to look at." It is thought that by beating each other with the onions they taught themselves not to yearn for Egypt or to forget Egyptian slavery.

== In popular culture ==
- Independent Israeli guitarist and singer Udi Davidi recorded a modern rendition of "Dayenu" on his 2006 album entitled "Back To You" (חוזר אליך).
- Pianist Richard Dworsky did a rendition of the song "Dayenu" every year during Passover on the public radio program A Prairie Home Companion.
- In Israeli screenings of The Rocky Horror Picture Show, after the line "if only we hadn't made this journey... if only the car hadn't broken down... oh, if only we were amongst friends... Or sane persons," the audience sings the chorus of "Dayenu".
- In the episode "Free to Be You and Me" of Supernatural, Dean tells the angel Castiel "Dayenu" as if the situation they are in is destined to be.
- Near the beginning of the 2013 videogame BioShock Infinite, a preacher recites a spoken sermon in a form identical to the song ("If he had done this, but not this, it would have been enough"), but in praise of the game's major antagonist rather than of God.
- In 2015, The Maccabeats, an a cappella group at Yeshiva University, released a Passover music video featuring a mashup of "Dayenu" which incorporated eight different musical motifs, including doo-wop, polka, heavy metal, funk, hip-hop, "island", dubstep, and barbershop quartet.
- "Dayenu" was used to explain the final game of the 2016 World Series that gave the Chicago Cubs a win after 108 years of drought.
- Kiko Argüello, the founder of the Neocatechumenal Way, composed a song called "Dayenu", replacing the original text with a Christian one.
- A version sung by Moishe Oysher was included in Nina Paley's Seder-Masochism.
- The staff of The Wieners Circle hot dog stand in Chicago sing "Dayenu" to customers in a NSFW video from 2007.
- Dayenu was featured in Season 5, Episode 4 of the biblical television show The Chosen, recited by Jesus and his followers during the Passover.

== See also ==
- Music of Israel
- Jewish prayer
