= Chad Gadya =

Passover song

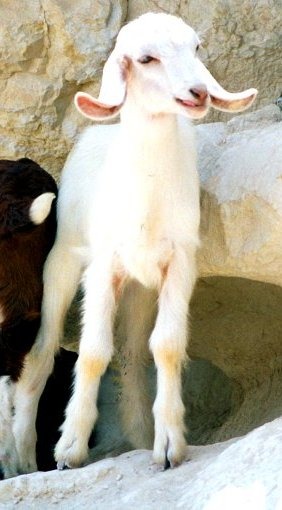
Chad Gadya

Chad Gadya or Had Gadya (Aramaic: חַד גַדְיָא chad gadya, "one little goat", or "one kid"; Hebrew: "גדי אחד gedi echad") is a playful cumulative song in Aramaic and Hebrew. It is sung at the end of the Passover Seder, the Jewish ritual feast that marks the beginning of the Jewish holiday of Passover. The melody may have its roots in Medieval German folk music. It appeared in Haggadahs printed in Prague in 1527 and 1590, and an early version appears in a siddur from the Jewish community of Provence, circa 13th to 14th century. This makes it a more recent inclusion in the traditional Passover seder liturgy.

The song is popular with children and similar to other cumulative songs: Echad Mi Yodea, ("Who Knows 'One'?") another cumulative song, is also in the Passover Haggadah.

== Lyrics ==
English One Little Goat	Romanization of Aramaic Chad Gadya	Transliteration of Aramaic ħad gadyā	Aramaic חַד גַּדְיָא
Verse 1:
One little goat, one little goat:	Chad gadya, chad gadya,	ħaḏ gaḏyā, ħaḏ gaḏyā,	חַד גַּדְיָא, חַד גַּדְיָא
Which my father bought for two zuzim.	dizabin abah bitrei zuzei.	dəzabbīn abbā biṯrē zūzē.	דְּזַבִּין אַבָּא בִּתְרֵי זוּזֵי
Verse 2:
One little goat, one little goat:	Chad gadya, chad gadya,	ħaḏ gaḏyā, ħaḏ gaḏyā,	חַד גַּדְיָא, חַד גַּדְיָא
Then cat came, and ate the goat,	ve-ata shunra ve-akhlah le-gadya	wəʔāṯā šūnrā wəʔāḵlā ləgaḏyā	וְאָתָא שׁוּנְרָא, וְאָכְלָה לְגַדְיָא
Which my father bought for two zuzim.	dizabin abba bitrei zuzei.	dəzabbīn abbā biṯrē zūzē.	דְּזַבִּין אַבָּא בִּתְרֵי זוּזֵי
Verse 3:
One little goat, one little goat:	Chad gadya, chad gadya,	ħaḏ gaḏyā, ħaḏ gaḏyā,	חַד גַּדְיָא, חַד גַּדְיָא
Then dog came, and bit the cat, that ate the goat,	ve-ata kalba ve-nashakh le-shunra, de-akhlah le-gadya	wəʔāṯā ḵalbā wənāšaḵ ləšūnrā, dəʔāḵlā ləgaḏyā	וְאָתָא כַלְבָּא ,וְנָשַׁךְ לְשׁוּנְרָא, דְּאָכְלָה לְגַדְיָא
Which my father bought for two zuzim.	dizabin abba bitrei zuzei.	dəzabbīn abbā biṯrē zūzē.	דְּזַבִּין אַבָּא בִּתְרֵי זוּזֵי
Verse 4:
One little goat, one little goat:	Chad gadya, chad gadya,	ħaḏ gaḏyā, ħaḏ gaḏyā,	חַד גַּדְיָא, חַד גַּדְיָא
Then stick came, and beat the dog,	ve-ata chutra, ve-hikkah le-khalba	wəʔāṯā ħūṭrā, wəhikkā ləḵalbā	וְאָתָא חוּטְרָא, וְהִכָּה לְכַלְבָּא
that bit the cat, that ate the goat,	de-nashakh le-shunra, de-akhlah le-gadya	dənāšaḵ ləšūnrā, dəʔāḵlā ləgāḏyā	דְּנָשַׁךְ לְשׁוּנְרָא, דְּאָכְלָה לְגַדְיָא
Which my father bought for two zuzim.	dizabin abba bitrei zuzei.	dəzabbīn abbā biṯrē zūzē.	דְּזַבִּין אַבָּא בִּתְרֵי זוּזֵי
Verse 5:
One little goat, one little goat:	Chad gadya, chad gadya,	ħaḏ gaḏyā, ħaḏ gaḏyā,	חַד גַּדְיָא, חַד גַּדְיָא
Then fire came, and burned the stick,	ve-ata nura, ve-saraf le-chutra	wəʔāṯā nūrā, wəśārap̄ ləħūṭrā	וְאָתָא נוּרָא, וְשָׂרַף לְחוּטְרָא
that beat the dog, that bit the cat, that ate the goat,	de-hikkah le-khalba, de-nashakh le-shunra, de-akhlah le-gadya	dəhikkā ləḵalbā, dənāšaḵ ləšūnrā, dəʔāḵlā ləgāḏyā	דְּהִכָּה לְכַלְבָּא ,דְּנָשַׁךְ לְשׁוּנְרָא, דְּאָכְלָה לְגַדְיָא
Which my father bought for two zuzim.	dizabin abba bitrei zuzei.	dəzabbīn abbā biṯrē zūzē.	דְּזַבִּין אַבָּא בִּתְרֵי זוּזֵי
Verse 6:
One little goat, one little goat:	Chad gadya, chad gadya,	ħaḏ gaḏyā, ħaḏ gaḏyā,	חַד גַּדְיָא, חַד גַּדְיָא
Then water came, and put out the fire,	ve-ata maya, ve-khavah le-nura	wəʔāṯā mayyā, wəḵāḇā lənūrā	וְאָתָא מַיָּא, וְכָבָה לְנוּרָא
that burned the stick, that beat the dog,	de-saraf le-chutra, de-hikkah le-khalba	dəšārap̄ ləħūṭrā, dəħikkā ləḵalbā	דְּשָׂרַף לְחוּטְרָא ,דְּהִכָּה לְכַלְבָּא
that bit the cat, that ate the goat,	de-nashakh le-shunra, de-akhlah le-gadya	dənāšaḵ ləšūnrā, dəʔāḵlā ləgāḏyā	דְּנָשַׁךְ לְשׁוּנְרָא, דְּאָכְלָה לְגַדְיָא
Which my father bought for two zuzim.	dizabin abba bitrei zuzei.	dəzabbīn abbā biṯrē zūzē.	דְּזַבִּין אַבָּא בִּתְרֵי זוּזֵי
Verse 7:
One little goat, one little goat:	Chad gadya, chad gadya,	ħaḏ gaḏyā, ħaḏ gaḏyā,	חַד גַּדְיָא, חַד גַּדְיָא
Then ox came, and drank the water,	ve-ata tora, ve-shatah le-maya	wəʔāṯā tōrā, wəšāṯā ləmayyā	וְאָתָא תוֹרָא, וְשָׁתָה לְמַיָּא
that put out the fire, that burned the stick,	de-khavah le-nura, de-saraf le-chutra	dəḵāḇā lənūrā, dəšārap̄ ləħūṭrā	דְּכָבָה לְנוּרָא ,דְּשָׂרַף לְחוּטְרָא
that beat the dog, that bit the cat, that ate the goat,	de-hikkah le-khalba, de-nashakh le-shunra, de-akhlah le-gadya	dəhikkā ləḵalbā, dənāšaḵ ləšūnrā, dəʔāḵlā ləgāḏyā	ּדְּהִכָּה לְכַלְבָּא, דְּנָשַׁךְ לְשׁוּנְרָא, דְּאָכְלָה לְגַדְיָא
Which my father bought for two zuzim.	dizabin abba bitrei zuzei.	dəzabbīn abbā biṯrē zūzē.	דְּזַבִּין אַבָּא בִּתְרֵי זוּזֵי
Verse 8:
One little goat, one little goat:	Chad gadya, chad gadya,	ħaḏ gaḏyā, ħaḏ gaḏyā,	חַד גַּדְיָא, חַד גַּדְיָא
Then slaughterer (Shohet) came, and killed the ox,	ve-ata ha-shochet, ve-shachat le-tora	wəʔāṯā hašōħēṭ, wəšāħaṯ ləṯōrā	וְאָתָא הַשּׁוֹחֵט, וְשָׁחַט לְתוֹרָא
that drank the water, that put out the fire,	de-shatah le-maya, de-khavah le-nura	dəšāṯā ləmayyā, dəḵāḇā lənūrā	דְּשָׁתָה לְמַיָּא ,דְּכָבָה לְנוּרָא
that burned the stick, that beat the dog,	de-saraf le-chutra, de-hikkah le-khalba	dəšārap̄ ləħūṭrā, dəhikkā ləḵalbā	דְּשָׂרַף לְחוּטְרָא, דְּהִכָּה לְכַלְבָּא
that bit the cat, that ate the goat,	de-nashakh le-shunra, de-akhlah le-gadya	dənāšaḵ ləšūnrā, dəʔāḵlā ləgāḏyā	דְּנָשַׁךְ לְשׁוּנְרָא, דְּאָכְלָה לְגַדְיָא
Which my father bought for two zuzim.	dizabin abba bitrei zuzei.	dəzabbīn abbā biṯrē zūzē.	דְּזַבִּין אַבָּא בִּתְרֵי זוּזֵי
Verse 9:
One little goat, one little goat:	Chad gadya, chad gadya,	ħaḏ gaḏyā, ħaḏ gaḏyā,	חַד גַּדְיָא, חַד גַּדְיָא
Then angel of death came, and slew the slaughterer,	ve-ata mal'akh ha-mavet, ve-shachat le-shochet	wəʔāṯā malʔaḵ hammāweṯ, wəšāħaṭ ləšōħēṭ	וְאָתָא מַלְאַךְ הַמָּוֶת, וְשָׁחַט לְשׁוֹחֵט
who killed the ox, that drank the water,	de-shachat le-tora, de-shatah le-maya	dəšāħaṭ ləṯōrā, dəšāṯā ləmayyā	דְּשָׁחַט לְתוֹרָא, דְּשָׁתָה לְמַיָּא
that put out the fire, that burned the stick,	de-khavah le-nura, de-saraf le-chutra	dəḵāḇā lənūrā, dəšārap̄ ləħūṭrā	דְּכָבָה לְנוּרָא, דְּשָׂרַף לְחוּטְרָא
that beat the dog, that bit the cat, that ate the goat,	de hikkah le-khalba, de-nashakh le-shunra, de-akhlah le-gadya	dəhikkā ləḵalbā, dənāšaḵ ləšūnrā, dəʔāḵlā ləgāḏyā	דְּהִכָּה לְכַלְבָּא, דְּנָשַׁךְ לְשׁוּנְרָא, דְּאָכְלָה לְגַדְיָא
Which my father bought for two zuzim.	dizabin abba bitrei zuzei.	dəzabbīn abbā biṯrē zūzē.	דְּזַבִּין אַבָּא בִּתְרֵי זוּזֵי
Verse 10:
One little goat, one little goat:	Chad gadya, chad gadya,	ħaḏ gaḏyā, ħaḏ gaḏyā,	חַד גַּדְיָא, חַד גַּדְיָא
Then came The Holy One, Blessed be He,	ve-ata ha-Kadosh Baruch Hu	wəʔāṯā haqqadōš bārūḵ hū	וְאָתָא הַקָּדוֹשׁ בָּרוּךְ הוּא
and smote the angel of death, who slew the slaughterer,	ve-shachat le-mal'akh ha-mavet, de-shachat le-shochet	wəšāħaṭ ləmalʔaḵ hammāweṯ, dəšāħaṭ ləšōħēṭ	וְשָׁחַט לְמַלְאַךְ הַמָּוֶת ,דְּשָׁחַט לְשׁוֹחֵט
who killed the ox, that drank the water,	de-shachat le-tora, de-shatah le-maya	dəšāħaṭ ləṯōrā, dəšāṯā ləmayyā	דְּשָׁחַט לְתוֹרָא, דְּשָׁתָה לְמַיָּא
that put out the fire, that burned the stick,	de-khavah le-nura, de-saraf le-chutra	dəḵāḇā lənūrā, dəšārap̄ ləħūṭrā	דְּכָבָה לְנוּרָא, דְּשָׂרַף לְחוּטְרָא
that beat the dog, that bit the cat, that ate the goat,	de-hikkah le-khalba, de-nashakh le-shunra, de-akhlah le-gadya	dəhikkā ləḵalbā, dənāšaḵ ləšūnrā, dəʔāḵlā ləgāḏyā	דְּהִכָּה לְכַלְבָּא ,דְּנָשַׁךְ לְשׁוּנְרָא, דְּאָכְלָה לְגַדְיָא
Which my father bought for two zuzim.	dizabin abba bitrei zuzei.	dəzabbīn abbā biṯrē zūzē.	דְּזַבִּין אַבָּא בִּתְרֵי זוּזֵי
Verse 11:
One little goat, one little goat.	Chad gadya, chad gadya,	ħaḏ gaḏyā, ħaḏ gaḏyā,	חַד גַּדְיָא, חַד גַּדְיָא

== Symbolism ==
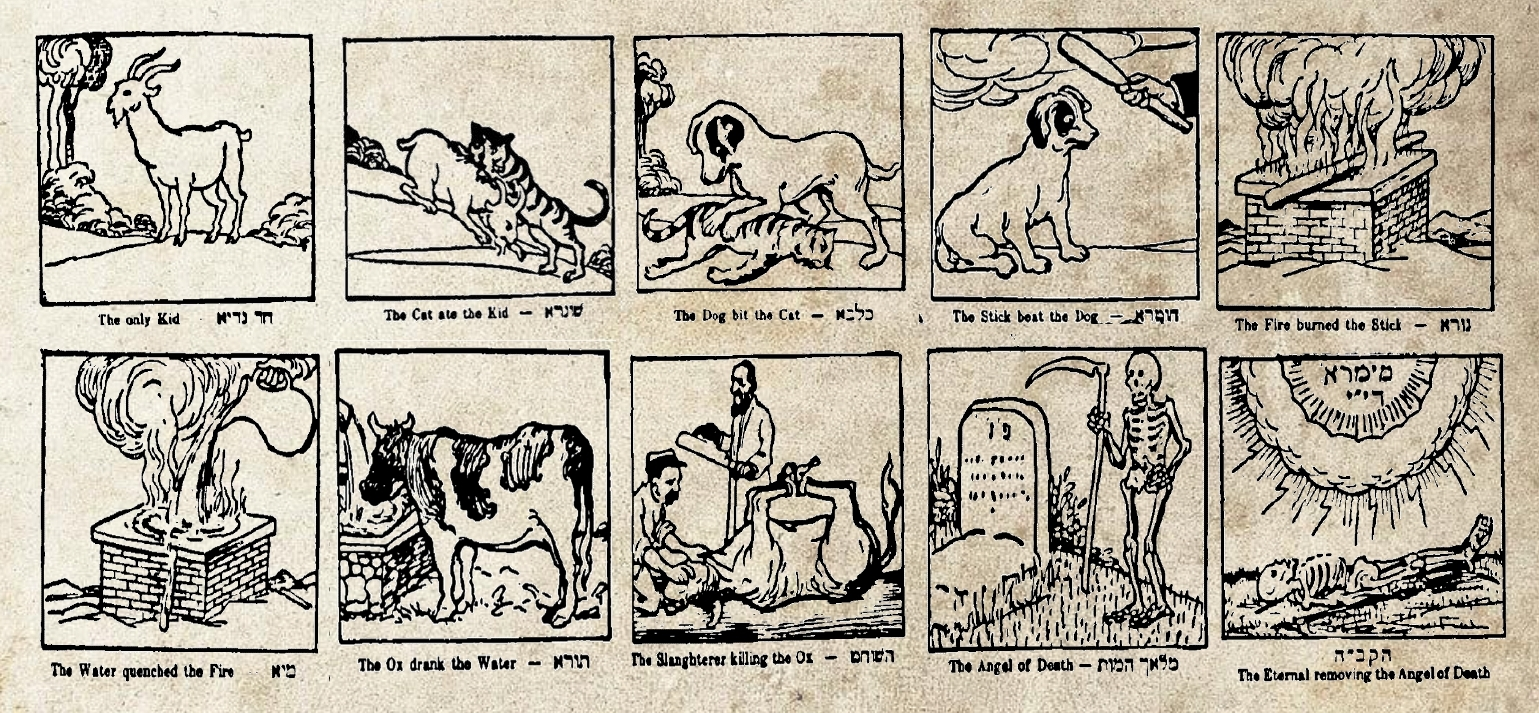
Chad Gadya (1928 illustration)

Traditional Ashkenazi rendition of the Passover song Chad Gadya

Chad Gadya, Sung by Yosef Elbaz, Jerusalem 19 April 1973. Sung in Aramaic and in Moroccan Arabic.

As with any work of verse, Chad Gadya is open to interpretation. According to some modern Jewish commentators, what appears to be a light-hearted song may be symbolic. One interpretation is that Chad Gadya is about the different nations that have conquered the Land of Israel: The kid symbolizes the Jewish people; the cat, Assyria; the dog, Babylon; the stick, Persia; the fire, Macedonia; the water, Roman Empire; the ox, the Saracens; the slaughterer, the Crusaders; the angel of death, the Ottomans. At the end, God returns to send the Jews back to Israel. The recurring refrain of 'two zuzim' is a reference to the two stone tablets given to Moses on Mount Sinai (or refer to Moses and Aaron). Apparently this interpretation was first widely published in pamphlet published in 1731 in Leipzig by Philip Nicodemus Lebrecht. This interpretation has become quite popular, with many variations of which oppressor is represented by which character in the song.

Though commonly interpreted as an historical allegory of the Jewish people, the song may also represent the journey to self-development. The price of two zuzim, mentioned in every stanza, is (according to the Targum Jonathan to First Samuel 9:8) equal to the half-shekel tax upon every adult Israelite male (in Exodus 30:13); making the price of two zuzim the price of a Jewish soul. In an article first published in the Journal of Jewish Music & Liturgy in 1994, Rabbi Kenneth Brander, the co-author of The Yeshiva University Haggadah, summarized the interpretations of three rabbis: (1) Rabbi Jacob Emden in 1795, as a list of the pitfalls and perils facing the soul during one's life. (2) Rabbi Jonathan Eybeschuetz (1690–1764) as a very abbreviated history of Israel from the Covenant of the Two Pieces recorded in Genesis 15 (the two zuzim), to slavery in Egypt (the cat), the staff of Moses (the stick) and ending with the Roman conqueror Titus (the Angel of Death). And (3) from Rabbi Moses Sofer, the Hatim Sofer (1762–1839), in which the song described the Passover ritual in the Temple of Jerusalem – the goat purchased for the Paschal sacrifice, according to the Talmud dreaming of a cat is a premonition of singing such as occurs in the seder, the Talmud also relates that dogs bark after midnight which is the time limit for the seder, the priest who led the cleaning of the altar on Passover morning would use water to wash his hands, many people at the Temple that day would bring oxen as sacrifices, the Angel of Death is the Roman Empire that destroyed the Second Temple, etc. The Vilna Gaon interpreted that the kid is the Birthright that passed from Abraham to Isaac; the father is Jacob; the two zumin is the meal Jacob paid Esau for his birthright; the cat is the envy of Jacob sons toward Joseph; the dog is Egypt where Joseph and his clan were enslaved; the stick is the staff of Moses; the fire the thirst for idolatry; the water the sages who eradicated idolatry; the ox is Rome; the shochet is the Messiah; the Angel of Death represents the death of the Messiah]; the Holy One is the L-d who arrives with the Messiah.

== Language ==
Descriptions of Chad Gadya being "entirely in Aramaic" are in error; the song is a mix of Aramaic and Hebrew and indicates that the composer's grasp of Aramaic was limited. For example, the song begins with ḥad gadya, which is Aramaic, instead of the Hebrew form gədi ʾeḥad, and for the cat the Aramaic shunra instead of the Hebrew ḥatul and for the dog the Aramaic kalba instead of the Hebrew kelev, etc., but, towards the end of the song, we find the slaughterer is the Hebrew ha-shoḥet instead of the Aramaic nakhosa and the Angel of Death is the Hebrew malʾakh ha-mavet instead of the Aramaic malʾach mota and, finally, "the Holy One, blessed be He" is the Hebrew ha-qadosh barukh hu whereas the Aramaic would be qudsha bərikh hu. Moreover, the Aramaic grammar is sloppy, for example. "then came the [masculine form] cat and [feminine form] ate". The suggestion that the song was couched in Aramaic to conceal its meaning from non-Jews is also in error, since its first publication included a full German translation.

Versions of the song exist in Yiddish, Ladino (Un cavritico), Judaeo-Italian and Judaeo-Arabic.

== Variations ==
The words "dizabin abah" (דְּזַבִּין אַבָּא) in the second line of the song literally mean "which father sold", rather than "which father bought". The Aramaic for "which father bought" is "dizvan abah" (דִּזְבַן אַבָּא), and some Haggadot have that as the text.

== El Lissitzky's Had Gadya ==
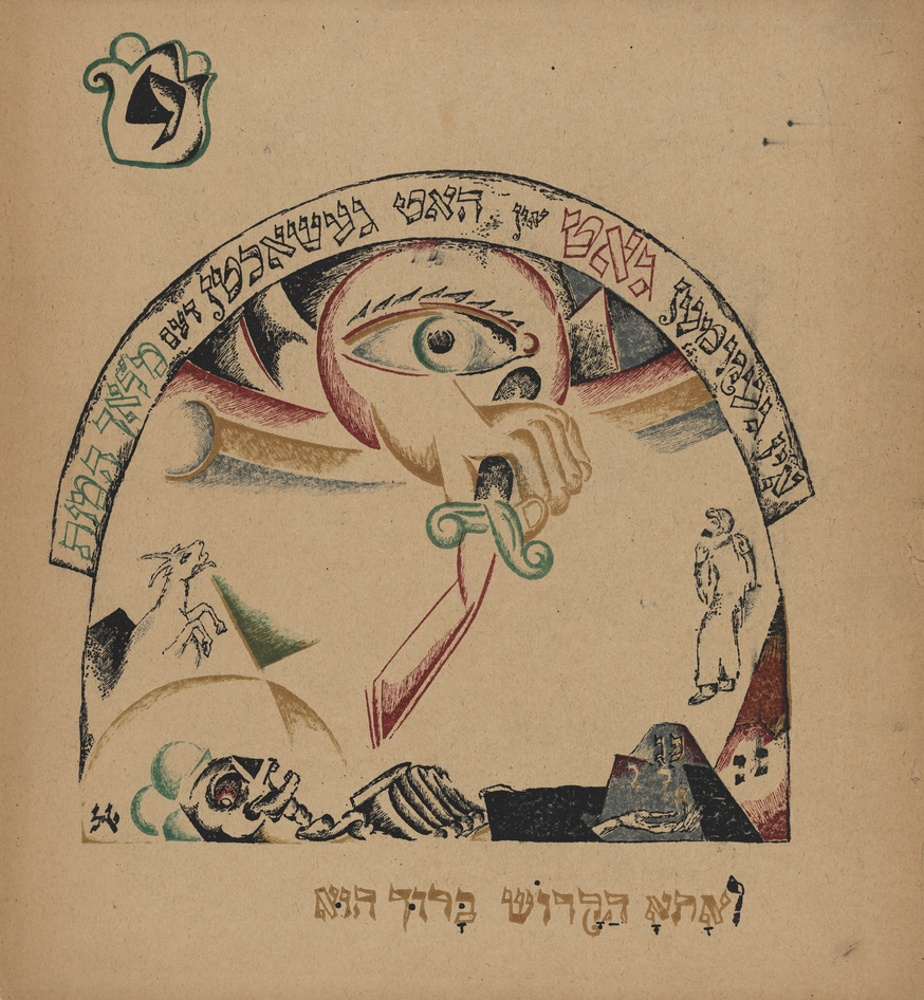
Last page of 1919 Had Gadya, hand of God killing the Angel of Death. See full book.

In 1917 and 1919 Russian avant-garde artist El Lissitzky created two variants of the book Had Gadya. Lissitzky's used Yiddish for the book verses, but introduced each verse in a traditional Aramaic, written in Hebrew alphabet. These two versions differs in style: art historians Dukhan and Perloff called the 1917 version "an expressionist decorativism of color and narrative" and "a set of brightly colored, folklike watercolors", respectively, and 1919 "marked by a stylistic shift ... the treatment of forms becomes essentially more structural and every list reflects a topological invariant of the whole series in Of Two Squares".

Two versions also differ in narrative: "if in the variant of 1917 the Angel of Death is depicted as cast down but still alive, that of 1919 shows him as definitely dead, and his victims (an old man and a kid) as resurrected." Dukhan treats these differences as Lissitzky's sympathies towards the October Revolution, after which Jews of the Russian Empire were liberated from discrimination. Perloff also thinks that Lissitzky "viewed the song both as a message of Jewish liberation based on the Exodus story and as an allegorical expression of freedom for the Russian people." She also noted that "the hand of God is strikingly similar to an image of a hand that appeared on one of the first series of stamps printed after the revolution of 1917. On the stamp, the hand is clearly a symbol of the Soviet people. And the angel of death, who is depicted as dying in the set of illustrations from 1917, is now dead—clearly, in light of the symbolic link to the czar, killed by the force of the revolution."

The cover of 1919 edition was designed in abstract suprematist forms.

== In popular culture ==
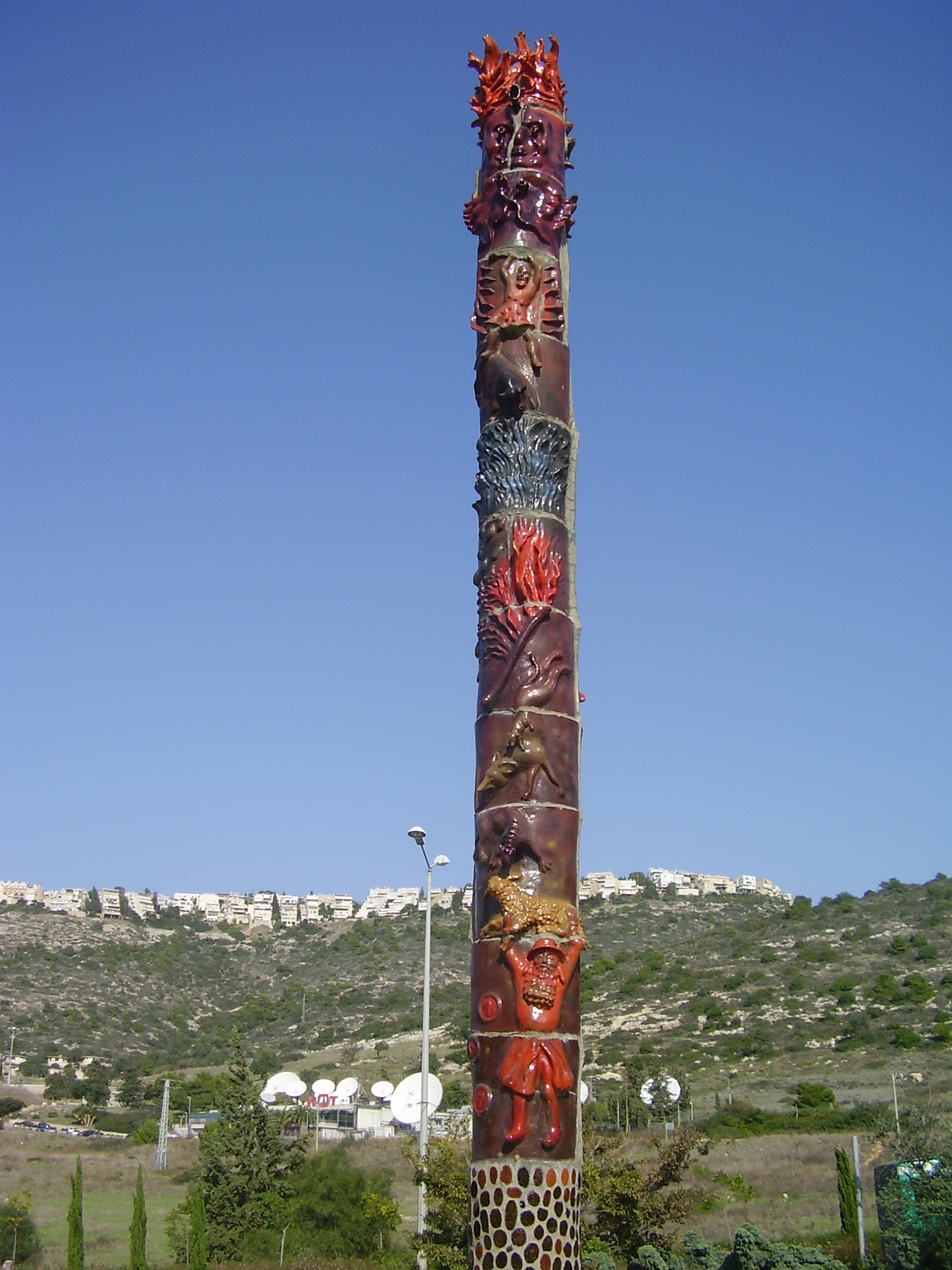
Chad Gadya column in Castra center, Haifa

- A controversial anti-war version of Chad Gadya was composed by Israeli singer Chava Alberstein. There were calls for the song to be banned on Israeli radio in 1989, although it became very well-known and is now frequently played during Passover. The soundtrack of the 2005 film Free Zone includes the song.
- In the Season 1, episode 14 of The West Wing "Take This Sabbath Day", the rabbi of Toby Ziegler's temple references this story as a deterrence against capital punishment and mentions that vengeance is not Jewish.
- It is source of the title A Kid for Two Farthings, a 1953 novel written by Wolf Mankowitz, the basis of a 1955 film and 1996 musical play.
- It was featured in the American television series NCIS in the season 7 opener "Truth or Consequences" by Abby and McGee, and then was sung jokingly in a scene by DiNozzo in another season 7 episode titled "Reunion". McGee explains that they accessed Mossad's encrypted files, "but they weren't in English, so we had to do a little bit of rudimentary linguistics. It's a Hebrew school nursery rhyme." Chad Gadya (One Little Goat). McGee and Abby start to enthusiastically sing along with the nursery rhyme."
- The recording "A Different Night" by the group Voice of the Turtle has 23 different versions of Chad Gadya in all different languages.
- The Israeli satirical team Latma has created a parody "Chad Bayta" ("One House"), to the tune of "Chad Gadya", which tells the story of a house in the settlements. Instead of a cat, a dog, a stick, and so on, the song features a person who snoops; the newspaper Haaretz, Benyamin Netanyahu, Tzipi Livni, Barack Obama, Ahmadinejad, and the UN, among others.
- It is sung in the seder scene of the 1999 film The Devil's Arithmetic, with Kirsten Dunst.
- In Italy the song has become very popular since the 1970s, when the Italian folk singer and composer Angelo Branduardi recorded it with the title of Alla fiera dell'est.
- It is the name of a theatre company based in Toronto, Canada: One Little Goat Theatre Company
- It is the subject of a lesson at the Hebrew school in Henry Roth's 1934 novel Call It Sleep.
- Jack Black sings an English translation of the song on YouTube with his classic heavy-metal flair. He also sings it a capella as a bonus track on the 2021 holiday compilation album Hanukkah + (Verve Forecast/Universal).
- Comedian Gilbert Gottfried mentions it in passing, without naming it, in some of his performances of the infamous joke The Aristocrats.
- A version sung by Moishe Oysher was included in Nina Paley's Seder-Masochism.

== Other uses ==
- In Yiddish slang, the term "chad gadya" is a euphemism for jail. A prisoner is said to languish in a chad gadya – that is, all alone.
- Chad Gadya was the pseudonym of Marousia (Miriam) Nissenholtz, the only female student at Bezalel Academy of Arts and Design in the Mutasarrifate of Jerusalem in 1912.

== See also ==
- Passover songs
