= The Rattlin' Bog =

Irish folk song

"The Rattlin' Bog" is an Irish folk song. It is a version of an internationally distributed folk song type. In the Roud Folk Song Index it has the number 129, and carries such titles as "The Everlasting Circle", "The Tree on the Hill", "The Green Grass Grew All Around", and "Down in the Lowlands", as well as "The Rattlin' Bog", The adjective rattlin' means "splendid" in the context of this song. It is a cumulative song, similar to "The Twelve Days of Christmas", as it has a list at the end of each verse which grows throughout the piece.

The Roud index lists 180 versions collected from oral tradition in English, and the song has analogues in French, Italian, German, and Dutch as well. Since it is a folk song, it has been transmitted over generations orally and aurally so many versions coexist and it may be impossible and even nonsensical to seek a single authoritative version of the song's lyrics. The earliest version appears to be "March to the Battlefield" in "Riley's Flute Melodies" published by Edward Riley (1769 - 1829). In 1877, water-colour painter and folk-song collector Miss Marianne Harriet Mason (1845 -1932) published a version called "Green Grass Grows all Around" in Nursery Rhymes and Country Songs. In the US, it has been a popular marching song at summer camps for several decades.

== Performing ==
During a performance, it is typical for the song to increase in speed with each additional verse, almost as a challenge to determine who can sing the lyrics the fastest without getting mixed up.

Some performances have one singer leading the song, singing the "Now on that..." lines solo. The whole group then joins in for the cumulative list and chorus. In some live performances, the audience sings along for as long as they can keep up, with most only singing the chorus by the end of the song.

Many variations exist where additional verses are added or exchanged to suit the locale where the song is performed. North American folk group The Idlers customarily sing about a bird inside an egg inside another bird that is in the nest, while others have a bird in the egg in the nest. Additionally, the group added a rash on the flea as a final verse. County Durham folk singer Ed Pickford added further verses going as far as an amoeba, in the process creating a popular drinking game as players try to keep up. Seamus Kennedy added even further by following an amoeba with a paramecium, followed by a virus, and finally a subatomic particle. Irish Singer Philip Noone took the song in a different direction completely by giving the chick a cigarette and ending with the smoke coming from the cigarette.

The song can be sung as an echo, where each line is sung by a lead and then repeated by others.

Chorus:
Hey ho, the rattlin' bog,
The bog down in the valley-o,
Hey ho, the rattlin' bog,
The bog down in the valley-o.

Now in the bog there was a tree,
A rare tree, a rattlin' tree,
The tree in the bog,
And the bog down in the valley-o.

Chorus

And on that tree there was a branch,
A rare branch, a rattlin' branch,
The branch on the tree, and the tree in the bog,
And the bog down in the valley-o.

Chorus

One version of the final line+refrain is:

The feather on the wing, and the wing on the bird, and the bird on the nest, and the nest on the twig, and the twig on the branch, and the branch on the tree, and the tree in the bog,
And the bog down in the valley-o.

Each phrase is sung to the same two-note melody.

== Notable recordings ==
- The Irish Rovers first recorded it in 1966 on "First of The Irish Rovers", and on later albums as "The Bog in the Valley".
- Golden Bough performs this on their album Kids at Heart: Celtic Songs for Children.
- Authority Zero performs this on their album Andiamo (hidden track).
- Red Grammer performs this on his Down The Do Re Mi recording.
- A Scottish version of the song is heard in the 1973 film The Wicker Man
- Schooner Fare performs this on their 1983 album Alive
- It is sung by a children's choir in the 2019 film The Hole in the Ground, and the song's lyrics tie into a mysterious hole that causes the events of the film.
- The Irish Descendants, recorded and performed a version.
- Dan Zanes performed this song on his 2002 album Night Time.
- The Wiggles perform this song on their 2019 album Party Time!
- Patrice O'Connor and Clodagh McCarthy's impromptu performance at a wedding reception posted to YouTube in 2017 became a viral phenomenon and one of the most widely shared Irish videos ever posted to the internet.
- Fiddler's Green (band) perform this song on their 2023 album The Green Machine named just "The Bog"
