= Alla fiera dell'est =

Studio album by Angelo Branduardi
- Released: 1976
- Studio: Sax Recording Studios
- Genre: Folk, Italian singer-songwriters
- Label: Polydor
- Producer: Angelo Branduardi, David Zard, Maurizio Fabrizio

Angelo Branduardi chronology
La luna (1975)	Alla fiera dell'est (1976)	La pulce d'acqua (1977)

Alla fiera dell'est is an album by the Italian singer-songwriter Angelo Branduardi. It was released in 1976 by Polydor and won the Italian Music Critic prize that same year. In 1978 it was released in a French version with the title "A la foire de l'est" and in an English version, entitled "Highdown Fair", with lyrics by Peter Sinfield.

Lyrics of the Italian version were written by Branduardi's wife, Luisa Zappa. The title track is an adaptation of a Hebrew Passover song "Chad Gadya". "Il vecchio e la farfalla" is inspired by an oriental proverb mentioned in The Travels of Marco Polo. "La serie dei numeri" ("The Song of Eternal Numbers") is taken from a Breton song, "Ar rannoù" ("The series"), contained in the anthology Barzaz Breiz. The melody of "Sotto il tiglio" ("Under the Linden Tree") is based on a German lied entitled "Unter den Linden", written by Walther von der Vogelweide.

Alla fiera dell'est was used as the main song in the Belgian movie Tori and Lokita where the protagonists sing it repeatedly whenever they feel down.

== Track listing ==
- All music and lyrics by Angelo Branduardi, with lyrical participation by Luisa Zappa.
1. "Alla fiera dell'est" - 5:26
2. "La favola degli aironi" - 3:47
3. "Il vecchio e la farfalla" - 2:59
4. "Canzone per Sarah" - 4:21
5. "La serie dei numeri" - 4:33
6. "Il dono del cervo" - 3:17
7. "Il funerale" - 8:10
8. "L'uomo e la nuvola" - 3:49
9. "Sotto il tiglio" - 2:56
10. "Canzone del rimpianto" - 3:01

== Personnel ==
- Angelo Branduardi: Vocals, electric and acoustic guitars, violin, lute
- Maurizio Fabrizio: Electric and acoustic guitars, lute
- Bruno De Filippi: Bouzouki, cuica, sitar, bass harmonica
- Tiziana Botticini: Harp
- Gianni Nocenzi: Piano and clarinet
- Gigi Capelotto: Electric bass
- Andy Surdi: Drums
- Mario Lamberti: Percussion
