= And the Green Grass Grew All Around =

American folk song

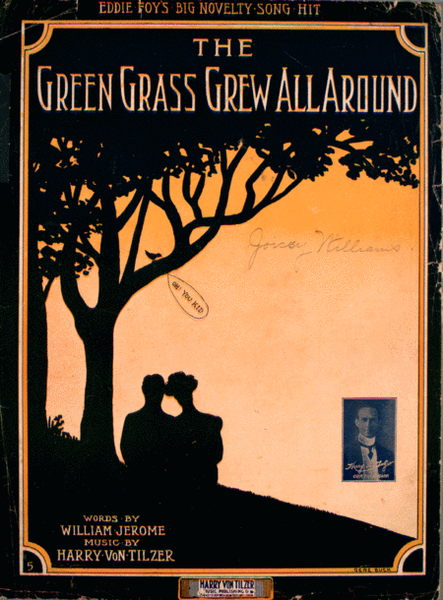
Sheet music cover featuring Von Tilzer, 1912

"And the Green Grass Grew All Around", also known as "The Green Grass Grew All Around" or "And the Green Grass Grows All Around", is a traditional Appalachian folk song that was first noted in 1877 in Miss M. H. Mason's book Nursery Rhymes and Country Songs, but is likely to be much older. Some sources give the author as William Jerome and the melody by Harry Von Tilzer in 1912.

As a popular classic children's song today, it is an example of a cumulative song.

It is similar to the Irish folk song The Rattlin' Bog, and versions exist in many other cultures and under many titles.
