= Rig-a-Jig-Jig =

19th-century folk song

Rig-a-Jig-Jig is a popular nineteenth-century folk song where a young man encounters a pretty girl. It is useful for singing games since it is a familiar tune that can be used by activity leaders even if there are no available musicians.

== Uses ==
The song can be used for various activities. It is used for single-circle games. It can also be used to encourage kids to choose a partner in children's games. In this set-up the players are arranged in a circle. A "young man" then moves inside the circle while singing the song. On the "a pretty girl I chanced to meet" line, he bows to one of the members of the circle (which can be termed as "pretty ladies"). If the pretty lady sings "a nice young man" then they join hands in the chorus and move together. The process is repeated with a new young man until all players are partnered.

== Lyrics ==
I. As I was walking down the street
down the street, down the street
A happy friend that I chanced to meet
Heigh ho, Heigh ho, Heigh ho, Heigh ho
Rig a jig jig and away we go, away we go, away we go.
Rig a jig jig and away we go, Heigh ho, Heigh ho, Heigh ho, Heigh ho
