= Old MacDonald Had a Farm =

Children's song

Nursery rhyme
- Written: 1906
- Published: 1906
- Recorded: 1917 (modern version)
- Songwriter: unknown

"Old MacDonald Had a Farm" (sometimes shortened to Old MacDonald) is a traditional children's song and nursery rhyme about a farmer and the various animals he keeps. Each verse of the song changes the name of the animal and its respective noise. For example, if the verse uses a cow as the animal, then "moo" would be used as the animal's sound. In many versions, the song is cumulative, with the animal sounds from all the earlier verses added to each subsequent verse.

The song is attributed to Thomas d'Urfey for an opera in 1706, before existing as a folk song in Great Britain, Ireland, and North America for hundreds of years in various forms then finally being standardised in the twentieth century. It has a Roud Folk Song Index number of 745.

== Modern lyrics ==
The lyrics to the standard version begin as follows, with the animal and its sound changing with each verse:

Old MacDonald had a farm, E-I-E-I-O!
And on his farm he had a cow, E-I-E-I-O!
With a moo-moo here and a moo-moo there,
Here a moo, there a moo,
Everywhere a moo-moo,
Old MacDonald had a farm, E-I-E-I-O!

== History ==
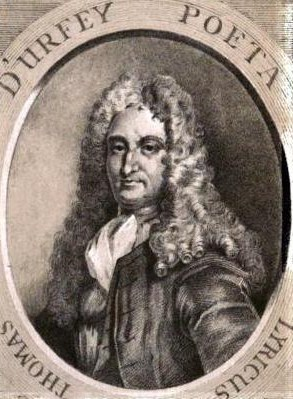
Thomas d'Urfey (1653–1723)

=== Thomas d'Urfey ===
The earliest variant of the song is "In the Fields in Frost and Snow" from a 1706 opera called The Kingdom of the Birds or Wonders of the Sun written by the English writer and composer Thomas d'Urfey. This version begins:

In the Fields in Frost and Snows,

Watching late and early;
There I keep my Father's Cows,
There I Milk 'em Yearly:
Booing here, Booing there,
Here a Boo, there a Boo, every where a Boo,
We defy all Care and Strife,

In a Charming Country-Life.

It is unknown whether this was the origin of the song, or if his version of the song was based on a traditional song already in existence. Like modern versions, the animals change from verse to verse and the rhythm is very similar, but it uses a different minor key melody.

D'Urfey's opera was largely unsuccessful, but the song was recycled, being expanded and printed in d'Urfey's own Wit and Mirth, or Pills to Purge Melancholy, vol. 2 (1719) and appearing in several operas throughout the eighteenth century such as John Gay and Johann Christoph Pepusch's Polly (1729). It also appeared on song sheets for decades, so it was presumably popular among ordinary English people in the eighteenth century whether it originated from the opera or not.

=== Traditional English versions ===
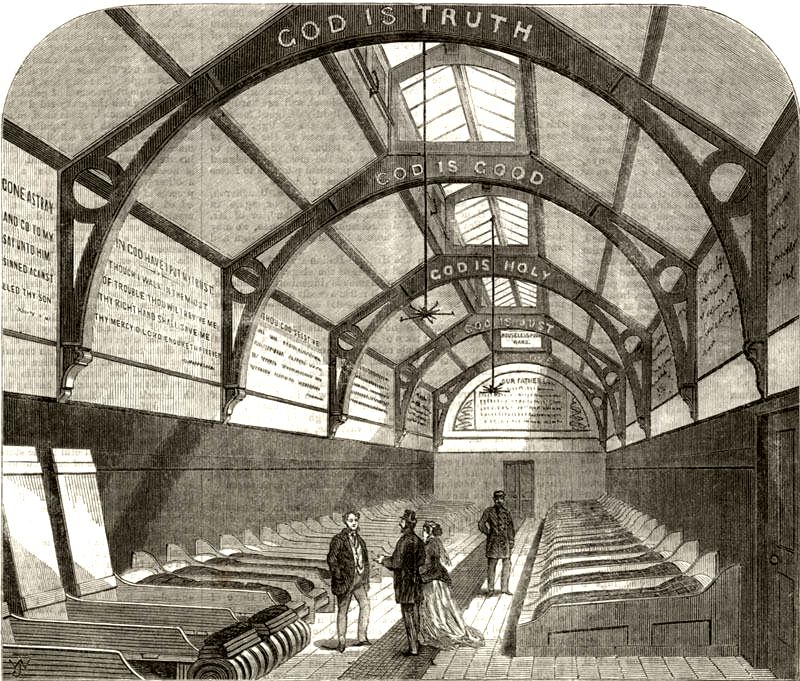
St. Marylebone Workhouse, 1867

Several versions were collected in England in around the turn of the twentieth century by folklorists, such as one called "The Farmyard Song" taken from a John Lloyd of Manchester in the 1880s by Anne Gilchrist, and another called "Father's Wood I O" collected in 1906 in Scotter, Lincolnshire by Percy Grainger; both of the original transcriptions of these versions are available via the Vaughan Williams Memorial Library website.

The famous folk song collector Cecil Sharp collected a version called "The Farmyard" in 1908 from a 74-year-old named Mrs. Goodey at Marylebone Workhouse, London; and the lyrics began with the following verse:

Up was I on my father's farm

On a May day morning early;
Feeding of my father's cows
On a May day morning early,
With a moo moo here and a moo moo there,
Here a moo, there a moo, Here a pretty moo.
Six pretty maids come and gang a-long o' me
To the merry green fields of the farm-yard.

Frederick Thomas Nettleingham's 1917 book Tommy's Tunes, a collection of World War I era songs, includes a variant of the song called "Ohio" which lists ten species: horse (neigh-neigh), dog (bow-wow/woof woof/ruff ruff), hen (cluck cluck), duck (quack quack), goose (honk honk), cow (moo moo), pig (grunt grunt), cat (meow meow), sheep/goat (baa baa), turkey (bird) (gobble-gobble), and donkey/mule (hee-haw). Although the reference on page 84-85 only lists dogs, hens, ducks, cows, pigs, cats and an ass. The farmer is called "Old Macdougal", unlike in most other traditional versions where the farmer is unnamed.

Old Macdougal had a farm, E-I-E-I-O

And on that farm he had a dog, E-I-E-I-O
With a bow-wow here, and a bow-wow there,
Here a bow, there a bow, everywhere a bow-wow.

=== Traditional Ozark versions ===
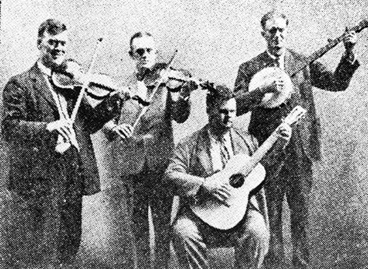
The Skillet Lickers, c. 1926

The song seems to have been particularly popular in the Ozark region of the United States before being standardised. A version was published in Vance Randolph's Ozark Folksongs (1980) called "Old Missouri", sung by a Mr. H. F. Walker of Missouri in 1922. This version names different parts of the mule rather than different animals:

Old Missouri had a mule, he-hi-he-hi-ho,

And on this mule there were two ears, he-hi-he-hi-ho.
With a flip-flop here and a flip-flop there,
And here a flop and there a flop and everywhere a flip-flop

Old Missouri had a mule, he-hi-he-hi-ho.

Several traditional Ozark versions which differ significantly from the standard version were recorded in the 1950s and 60s by different collectors; these recordings are available on the University of Arkansas online digital collection.

== Early recordings ==
The oldest version listed in The Traditional Ballad Index, is the Sam Patterson Trio's "Old MacDonald Had a Farm," released on the Edison label in 1925, followed by a version recorded by Gid Tanner and His Skillet Lickers in 1927. These recordings may be the first known versions to use the now standard tune, and the first to name the farmer "Old MacDonald". It is unknown what the traditional source of these iconic elements was, but the American versions seem most similar, with their E-I-E-I-O refrains and "old" farmers mentioned in the first line.

== See also ==
- List of animal sounds
- Little Boy Blue
- Mary Had a Little Lamb
