= Echad Mi Yodea =

Passover song

Echad Mi Yodea, recorded in Tel Aviv in 1966 (nusach Corfu)

"Echad Mi Yodea" (Hebrew: אחד מי יודע?, lit. 'One, Who Knows?') is a traditional cumulative song sung on Passover and found in the haggadah. It enumerates common Jewish motifs and teachings. It is meant to be fun and humorous, while still imparting important lessons to the children present.

Recitation is varied from family to family. The song has versions in Hebrew, Yiddish, Arabic, and many other vernacular languages. Sometimes it is played as a memory game, recited without looking. Sometimes the goal is to recite the entire verse in one breath.

== Names ==
The song is known in several languages.

- Yiddish as Ver ken zogn ver ken redn (ווער קען זאָגן ווער קען רעדן)
- Ladino as Ken supyese i entendyese
- Judeo-Arabic, according to the Syrian Jews of Aleppo, as Min Ya3lam U Min Yidri
- Judeo-Arabic, according to the Tunisian Jews of Djerba, as Kan Nadri U Kan Nadri
- Bukhori as Yakumin ki medonad
- Lishan Didan as mani kyel ḥa (מַנִי כיֵל חָא)

== Meaning ==
Although it can appear to be simply a juvenile children's song, an important message is being imparted to those present at the Passover table. The main theme of Passover, and particularly of the Seder, is not only the physical freedom of a nation of slaves. More importantly, it is the spiritual and mental freeing of this people, to become a nation unto God, His Chosen People. As His people, the Jewish Nation is expected to be wholly at one with God, and to relate everything in their lives to Him. It is sometimes thought that word association reveals the unconscious mind. Thus, it is at this point in the Seder that the Jews sing this cumulative song. After relating God's wonders and kindness, and the events of the Exodus, the song demonstrates how everything can and should relate to God: "If I say 'One', you think 'God!', if I say 'Five', you think 'Books of Moses!'".

== History ==
According to the Encyclopaedia Judaica, this song is first found in Ashkenazi Haggadot of the 16th century and this song did not appear in non-Ashkenazi Haggadot until the 19th century. It is believed to have originated in Germany in the 15th century, possibly based on a German folk song "Guter freund ich frage dich", which means "Good friend, I ask you".

In a handwritten siddur from the year 1406, it is written that the piyyut was found in the synagogue of Rabbi Elazar of Vurmiza, author of Sefer HaRokeach. The piyyut was first printed in Ashkenazi Haggadot in 1590 (Prague printing).

== Structure and text ==
"Echad Mi Yodea" is a cumulative song, meaning that each verse is built on top of the previous verses. There are thirteen verses.

The first verse runs:

Who knows one?
I know one.
One is our God, in heaven and on earth.

The second verse:

Who knows two?
I know two.
Two are the tablets of the covenant;
One is our God, in heaven and on earth.

...and so forth. The last verse is:

Who knows thirteen?
I know thirteen.
Thirteen are God's principles;
Twelve are the tribes of Israel;
Eleven are the stars of Joseph's dream;
Ten are the Commandments;
Nine are the months of childbirth;
Eight are the days before circumcision;
Seven are the days of the week;
Six are the sections of the Mishnah;
Five are the books of the Torah;
Four are the Matriarchs;
Three are the Patriarchs;
Two are the tablets of the covenant;
One is our God, in heaven and on earth.

Popular version
English		Hebrew		Yiddish	
1.	One is our God, in heaven and on earth	אחד אלוהינו שבשמיים ובארץ	.א	איינער איז הקדוש ברוך הוא אויף דער ערד און הימעל איינער ביסטו	.א
2.	Two are the tablets of the covenant;	שני לוחות הברית	.ב	צוויי לוחות פון ספיר שטיין געשריבען האָט זיי דער אייבערשטער אליין	.ב
3.	Three are the Fathers	שלושה אבות	.ג	דריי אבות זענען ביי אונז דאָ אברהם, יצחק, יעקב, זכרונם לברכה	.ג
4.	Four are the Mothers	ארבע אימהות	.ד	!פיר אימהות זענען ביי אונז דאָ שרה, רבקה, רחל אוּן לאה	.ד
5.	Five are the books of the Torah	חמישה חומשי תורה	.ה	די תורה איז צוטיילט אויף פינף ספרים בראשית, שמות, ויקרא, במדבר, דברים	.ה
6.	Six are the books of the Mishnah	שישה סידרי משנה	.ו	זעקס חלקים, עפען אויף און זע ווערט צוטיילט די תורה שבעל פה	.ו
7.	Seven are the days of the week	שיבעה ימי שבתא	.ז	א גאנצע וואָך גרייט מען זיך צו דער זיבעטער טאָג שבת, שטעלט זיך אָפ אין רוּ	.ז
8.	Eight are the days of the circumcision	שמונה ימי מילה	.ח	אכט טעג ווען א קיד איז אלט מאכט מען איהם א ברית, און ער ווערט געמַל'ט	.ח
9.	Nine are the months of the pregnant	תישעה ירחי לידה	.ט	ניין מאנאטען ווערט איינגעשטעלט אייעדער א קינד קומט אויף דער וועלט	.ט
10.	Ten are the Commandments	עשרה דיבריא	.י	!אויף באַרג סיני האָט אונזער גאָט אונז געגעבען די צען געבאָט	.י
11.	Eleven are the stars of the Joseph's dream	אחד עשר כוכביא	.יא	אחד עשר לאָזט אונז הערען יוסף'ס חלום און די עלף שטערען	.יא
12.	Twelve are the tribes of Israel	שנים עשר שיבטיא	.יב	יעקב'ס קינדער פון דור צו דור די צוועלף שבטים, און ראובן איז דער בכור	.יב
13.	Thirteen are the attributes of God	שלושה עשר מידיא	.יג	א גאָט פון רחמנות איז אונזער בורא דרייצען מידות לערנט אונז די תורה	.יג

Rhyming version
English		Hebrew	
1.	One is Hashem, one is Hashem, one is Hashem! In the Heaven and the Earth	אחד אלוהינו שבשמיים ובארץ	.א
2.	Two are the tablets that Moshe brought;	שני לוחות הברית	.ב
3.	Three are the Fathers	שלושה אבות	.ג
4.	Four are the Mothers	ארבע אימהות	.ד
5.	Five are the books of the Torah	חמישה חומשי תורה	.ה
6.	Six are the books of the Mishnah	שישה סידרי משנה	.ו
7.	Seven are the days of the week ooh-ah	שיבעה ימי שבתא	.ז
8.	Eight are the days til the Brit Milah	שמונה ימי מילה	.ח
9.	Nine are the months til the baby's born	תישעה ירחי לידה	.ט
10.	Ten are the ten Commandments	עשרה דיבריא	.י
11.	Eleven are the stars in Joseph's dream	אחד עשר כוכביא	.יא
12.	Twelve are the tribes of Israel	שנים עשר שיבטיא	.יב
13.	Thirteen are the attributes of Hashem	שלושה עשר מידיא	.יג

=== Yiddish version ===
Yiddish singing version (sometimes known as Mu Asapru)
English		Yiddish transliteration	Yiddish
Chorus:	Hebrew What can I say? What can I tell? back to Yiddish Hey! Hey! Ya da da da da! Who can say, who can tell, what is the meaning of ___?	Mu asapru, mu adabru, oyscha! oyscha! Ya da da da da, ver ken zogn, ver ken redn, vos di ___ batayt?	מה אספרה, מה אדברה, אױסכאַ! אױסכאַ! יאַ דאַ דאַ ... װער קען זאָגן, װער קען רעדן, װאָס די ____ באַטײַט?
1.	One is God, and God is one, and there is no other.	Eyner is Got, und Got is eyner, un vayte keyner.	אײנער איז גאָט, און גאָט איז אײנער, און װײַטע קײַנער
2.	Two are the tablets	Tzvey zenen di lukhes	צװײ זענען די לוחות
3.	Three are the Fathers	Dray zenen di Oves	דרײַ זענען די אבֿות
4.	Four are the Mothers	Fir zenen di Imes	פיר זענען די אימהות
5.	Five are the fifths of the Torah	Finf zenen di Khamushim	פינף זענען די חמושים
6.	Six are the books of the Mishnah	Zekst zenen di Mishnayes	זעקסט זענען די משניות
7.	Seven are the weekdays	Zibn zenen di Vokhnteg	זיבן זענען די װאָכנטעג
8.	Eight days till the bris	Akht teg iz der bris	אַכט טעג איז דער ברית
9.	Nine months you're carried (in the womb)	Nayn khedoshim trogt men	נײַן חודשים טראָגט מען
10.	Ten are the Commandments	Tzen zenen di gebot	צען זענען די געבאָט
11.	Eleven are the stars (in Joseph's dream)	Elef zenen di shtern	עלף זענען די שטערן
12.	Twelve are the tribes (of Israel)	Tzvelf zenen di shvotim	צװעלף זענען די שבֿוטים
13.	Thirteen is a bar mitzvah	Draytzn iz men bar mitzvah	דרײַצן איז מען בר מצווה
Complete verse.	Thirteen is a bar mitzvah, twelve are the tribes, eleven are the stars, ten are the Commandments, nine months you're carried, eight days till the bris, seven are the weekdays, six are the books of the Mishnah, five are the fifths of the Torah, four are the Mothers, three are the Fathers, two are the tablets, and one is God, and God is one, and there is no other. Hey!	Draytzn iz men bar mitzvah, tzvelf zenen di shvotim, elf zenen di shterm, tzen zenen di gebot, nayn khedoshim trogt men, akht teg iz der bris, zibn zenen di vokhnteg, zekst zenen di Mishnayes, finf zenen di Khamushim, fir zenen di Imes, dray zenen di Oves, tzvey zenen di lukhes, un einer is Got, un Got is einer, un vayte keyner. Oy!	דרײַצן איז מען בר מצווה, צװעלף זענען די שבֿוטים, עלף זענען די שטערן, צען זענען די געבאָט, נײַן חודשים טראָגט מען, אַכט טעג איז דער ברית, זיבן זענען די װאָכנטעג, זעקסט זענען די משניות, פינף זענען די חמושים, פיר זענען די אימהות, דרײַ זענען די אבֿות, צװײ זענען די לוחות, און אײנער איז גאָט, און גאָט איז אײנער, און װײַטע קײַנער. אוי!

=== Spanish version ===
Showing the last complete paragraph, as an example. First and Last verses would be sung in Hebrew.

Shloshá Asar, Mi Yodea?
Shloshá Asar, Ani Yodea!

Trece años del Bar Mitzvá
Doce Tribus de Israel
Once Estrellas de Iaakov
Diez Mandamientos Son
Nueve Meses de la preñada
Ocho Días del Milá
Siete Días de la Semana
Seis Libros de la Mishná
Cinco Libros de la Torá
Cuatro Madres de Israel
Tres Nuestros Padres Son
Dos Tablas de La Ley
Uno es el Creador

Eloheinu, Eloheinu,
Eloheinu, Eloheinu,
She-bashamaim uva'aretz

=== Judaeo-Spanish version ===
Ken supyese y entendyese alavar al Dio kreyense?

Kuale es el uno?
Uno es el Kriador, Baruch Hu Baruch shemo

Kuales son loz dos?
Dos Moshe y Aron

Kuales son los tres?
Trez padrez muestros son, [Avram, Itzhak, y Yaakov]

Kuales son los kuatro?
Kuatro madrez muestras son, [Sara, Rivka, Leah, Rahel]

Kuales son los sinko?
Sinko livroz de la Ley

Kuales son los seish?
Seish diaz de la semana

Kuales son los syete?
Syete dias con Shabbat

Kuales son loz ocho?
Ocho diaz de la mila

Kuales son loz nueve?
Nueve mezes de la prenyada

Kuales son los diesh?
Diez mandamientoz de la Ley

Kuales son loz onze?
Onze trivoz in Yisrael

Kuales son loz doze?
Dosay trivos kon Yosef

=== Judaeo-Arabic version ===
According to the custom of Aram Soba, Aleppo:

מן יִעלַם וּמן יִדרִי
ללַה רַבּ אִל מִדגַ'ללִי

הֵדַה הִנֵּן אִל תלַתַּעִשׁ
וּתלַתֵעִשׁ אִל בַּר מִצְבָּה
תנַעִשׁ שׁבטֵי יִשְׂרָאֵל
חדַעִשׁ כּוֹכַּב בִּשַּׂמַה
עַשִׁר קִלְמַת אִתּוֹרָה
תִּשׁעַת אִשׁהוֹר אִל חִבּלֵה
תִמִן-ת-אִיַּים אִל מִילָה
שַׂבעת-אִיַּים אִל חוּפָּה
סִתֵּי סְדַאדִיר אִל מִשׁנָה
כַמשֵׂה מְסַאחַף אִתּוֹרָה
אַרבַּעַה אִמַּתנַה
וּתלַתֵה אַבַּתנַה
וּתנֵן מוּסַה וּאַהַרן
וַאחַד יאַלִי-כַלַאְנַה
אַללַהוּ אַללַהוּ לַא אִלַהּ אִללַה הוּא

Transliteration

Min ya'elam wumin yidri
Allah rab el mijalli
Hda'hinen il tleta'ash
tleta'ash il bar misba
tna'ash shibte Yisrael
hda'ash kokab bisama
'asher qilmat itorah
tisa'at ishhor il hible
tmint-iyyam il mila
sab'at-iyyam il hupa
site sdadir il Mishna
khamse msahaf itorah.
Arba'a imatna
wutlate abatna
wutnen Musa waAharon
wahid yalli ilkhalana,
Allah hu Allah hu, la illah illahu

Translation

Who knows, and who understands?
God is the master of the revealed universe
God is the one and the only Creator.
God, God, there is no God but God.
(some say: Blessed be He and Blessed be His Name)
(some say: God is one)
Thirteen is bar mitzvah
twelve tribes of Israel
eleven stars in the sky
ten commandments
nine months of pregnancy
eight days for circumcision
seven days for huppa
six orders of the Mishna
five books of the Torah
four mothers
three fathers
two are Moses and Aaron
God is the one and the only Creator.
God, God, there is no God but God.

=== Judaeo-Tajik or Bukharian version ===
Yakumin ki medonad?
Yakumin man medonam!
Yakumin Khudoy-i rab-ul-olamin.

...

Sezdahum ki medonad?
Sezdahum man medonam!
Sezdahum sezdah khislat-ho.
Duvozdahum duvozdah sivto-ho.
Yozdahum yozdah sitora-ho.
Dahumin dah sukhanon.
Nöhumin nöh moh-i zanon.
Hashtumin hasht röz-i milo.
Haftumin haft röz-i hafta.
Shashumin shash sidrey Mishno.
Panjumin panj sifr-o Töro.
Chorumin chor modaron.
Seyumin se padaron.
Duyumin du lavkh-i gavhar.
Yakumin Khudoy-i rab-ul-olamin.

=== Lishan Didan version ===
mani kyel ḥa? ana kyen/kyan ḥa. əlha bšəmme w'ara.

tre loḥe

taha dade

arba dae

...

מַנִי כיֵל חָא? אַנָא כיֵן/כיַן חָא. אְלהָא בְשְׁמֵּה וּבְֿאַרעָא

תרֵה לוֹחֵה

טָהָא דַדֵה

אַרבָע דַעֵה

...

=== Judaeo-Georgian version ===
In the Georgian script:

ერთი ვინ იცის? ერთი მე ვიცი, ერთი
რძანდება ღმერთი ჩვენი მაღლა
მცებში და შინა დედამიწაზედა.

ცამეტი ვინ იცის? ცამეტი მე
ვიცი. ცამეტი რიგები, თორმეტი
შებატიმები, თერთმეტი
ვარსკვლავები იოსებისა,
ათი ბრძანება, ცხრა თვეები
მშობიარობისა, რვა დღეები
მილისა, შვიდი დღეები შაბათისა,
ექვსი წყობა მიშნისა, ხუთი ხუმაში
თორისა, ოთხი დედები, სამი მამები,
ორი ლუხოთ აბერითი, ერთი
ბრძანდება ღმერთი ჩვენი მაღლა
მცებში და შინა დედამიწაზედა.

Transliteration:

erti vin icis? erti me vici, erti
brdzandeba ghmerti chveni magla
mcebshi da shina dedamits'azeda.

camet'i vin icis? camet'i me vici, camet'i rigebi
tormet'i shebatimebi, tertmet'i varsk'vlavebi iosebisa,
ati brdzaneba siaize, ckhra
tveebi mshobiarobisa, rva
dgheebi milisa, shvidi dgheebi
shabatisa, ekvsi
ts'q'oba mishnisa, khuti
khumashi torisa, otkhi dedebi, sami
mamebi, ori lukhot
aberiti, erti brdzandeba ghmerti
chveni magla mcebshi da shina
dedamits'azeda.

== Popular culture ==
The song appears in The Garden of the Finzi-Continis (film) 1970 movie, sung amidst the rise of Mussolini's racial laws and alignment with Nazi Germany.

The Judaism section of the Stack Exchange Network of question-and-answer websites is named Mi Yodeya after this song.

Entebbe (titled 7 Days in Entebbe in the U.S.), a 2018 crime thriller film directed by José Padilha and written by Gregory Burke, features a dance on the tunes of the Echad Mi Yodea song, choreographed by Ohad Naharin of the Batsheva dance company.

During an episode of the interactive cartoon "Charlie Gets Fired", the user has the chance for Charlie to sing the whole song, to the chagrin of his boss.

== See also ==
- Green Grow the Rushes, O
