= Passover songs =

Songs associated with the Jewish festival of Passover

Passover songs are songs from the seder, the festive meal associated with the Jewish festival of Passover.

== Songs before the meal ==
Songs before the meal include:

- The Seder (Kadesh Urchatz): a table of contents of the seder ceremony, naming the 15 sections of the seder.
- Kiddush: The Kiddush is traditionally sung to a special melody used only on the Three Pilgrimage Festivals.
- Ma Nishtana: The Four Questions are traditionally asked by the youngest child at the table who is able.
- Avadim Hayinu: A single sentence stating, "We were slaves to Pharaoh in Egypt—now we are free."
- Baruch Hamakom: A song praising God, both in general and for giving the Torah to the Jewish People.
- Vehi Sheamda: In every generation arises those who would destroy us, but the holy one saves us from their hands.
- Dayenu: It would have been enough for us.
- Al Achat: A follow-up to Dayenu saying "How much more so we should be grateful to God" that all of the items of Dayenu were done for us.
- B'tzeit Yisrael: "When Israel went forth from Egypt, the house of Jacob from barbarous people"
- Ma Lecha Hayam: A poetic description of the sea turning back, mountains skipping like rams, the hills like lambs.

=== Ma Nishtanah ===
"Ma Nishtanah" (the "Four Questions") is the four questions sung at the Passover seder by the youngest child at the table who is able. The questions are asked as part of the haggadah, after the Yachatz (יחץ), as part of the Maggid (מגיד).

=== Dayenu ===
"Dayenu" is a Hebrew song, traditionally sung during the celebration of Passover. The word itself essentially means "It would have been enough for us." "Day" is the Hebrew word for "enough" and the suffix "enu" means "our".

The song goes through a series of gifts believed granted by God to the Israelites (such as Torah or Shabbat), proclaiming that any of them alone would have been sufficient, to express greater appreciation for them as a whole.

It is 15 verses long, sequentially recounting each divine intervention in the story of the Exodus. After each divine act, the chorus "(if God had done only this) it would have been enough for us" is sung.

== Songs after the meal ==
=== Eliyahu HaNavi ===
"Eliyahu HaNavi" (Elijah the Prophet) entreats the prophet Elijah, an invited guest at the Passover meal, to return soon with the messiah. Of unknown authorship, the refrain is based on First Kings 17:1. This is often sung at the opening of the door for Elijah, upon pouring the fourth cup. This song is also part of the traditional Saturday night Havdalah service. The refrain is:

Transliteration

Eliyahu haNavi
Eliyahu haTishbi,
Eliyahu haGil'adi

Bim'hera v'yameinu yavoh eleinu,
im mashiach ben David. (x2)

English Translation

Elijah the prophet
Elijah the Tishbite,
Elijah the Giladite

In haste and in our days may he come to us
with the messiah, son of David. (x2)

The full song has nine verses recounting the courageous and saintly deeds of Elijah, each beginning with אִישׁ (ish) – "The man (who)". followed by a word in an alphabetic acrostic; then the quotation of Malachi 3:23–24, and then concluding with "Happy is he who has seen his [Elijah's] face in a dream".

== Songs of the Nirtzah ==
The following are traditionally sung in the Nirtzah, the last of the 15 sections of the seder, devoted almost exclusively to singing.

=== L'shana Haba'ah ===
"L'Shana Haba'ah bi'Yerushalayim": The whole line means "Next year in Jerusalem!" and references the desire to celebrate Passover in a rebuilt Temple in a Messianic era. In Israel, the tradition is to recite "L'Shana haba'ah bi'Yerurshalayim habenuyah" ("Next year in the rebuilt Jerusalem"). This line is used both as the conclusion of the Passover Seder and after the Ne'ila (Concluding) service on Yom Kippur. The phrase is first seen in the Passover liturgy in the Birds' Head Haggadah published around 1300 and was attested a century later by Rabbi Isaac Tyrnau as an accepted component of the Seder.

=== Adir Bimlukha ===
Adir Bimlukha (also known as Ki Lo Na'eh): This song makes no mention of Passover but recites, in each stanza, two majestic descriptions of God, followed by the designation of a multitude (scholars, the faithful, the angels, etc.) who praise Him, the three lines being in a continuing alphabet acrostic, with the refrain, "Thine and thine, thine yes thine, thine only thine. Thine, Lord, is the kingship." And the stanza concludes with כִּי לוֹ נָאֶה, כִּי לוֹ יָאֶה׃ – (ki lo no'eh, ki lo yo'eh) – "For Him praise is due, for Him praise is fitting." The song apparently is inspired by Psalm 74:16 ("Yours is the day, Yours is the night") and by a Midrashic passage (Genesis Rabbah 6:2) which enlarges on those words. The authorship and date of composition are unknown, it was originally sung year-round at meals, it was not part of the Seder in the 11th century but came to be part of the Seder by the time of Rabbi Meir of Rothenburg in the 13th century.

=== Adir Hu ===
"Adir Hu" (Mighty is He): a hymn naming the virtues of God in order of the Hebrew alphabet, expressing hope that God will rebuild the Holy Temple speedily. Most of the virtues of God are adjectives (for instance, Holy (Kadosh) is he); however, a few are nouns (for instance, Lord is he). The traditional melody is a bouncy, major one. Other melodies, however, have been composed for the alphabetical song. There is also a feminist variant of the song by Rabbi Jill Hammer which calls God "She" and, quoting Rabbi Hammer, "emphasizes God’s sharing in human joys and griefs, and God’s ability to renew life through the strength of the earth."

=== Echad Mi Yodea ===
"Echad Mi Yodea" (Who Knows One?): Starting at one and going up to thirteen, each verse describes a different religious or worldly concept associated with its number. For example, the fifth verse is about the five books of the Torah whereas the ninth verse describes the nine months of pregnancy. After singing each new verse, all the preceding verses are repeated in decreasing order back down to one.

=== Chad Gadya ===
"Chad Gadya" ("One Kid" 'i.e., baby goat]) is an Aramaic song describing the consuming of each entity by the next, from a goat, through a cat, dog, a stick, fire, water, an ox, a butcher, and the angel of death, all the way up to God. Many think it metaphorically tells the history of the Jews from their beginning to the future Messianic time.
