= Avirbhav Verma =

Indian tabla player and percussionist (born 1985)

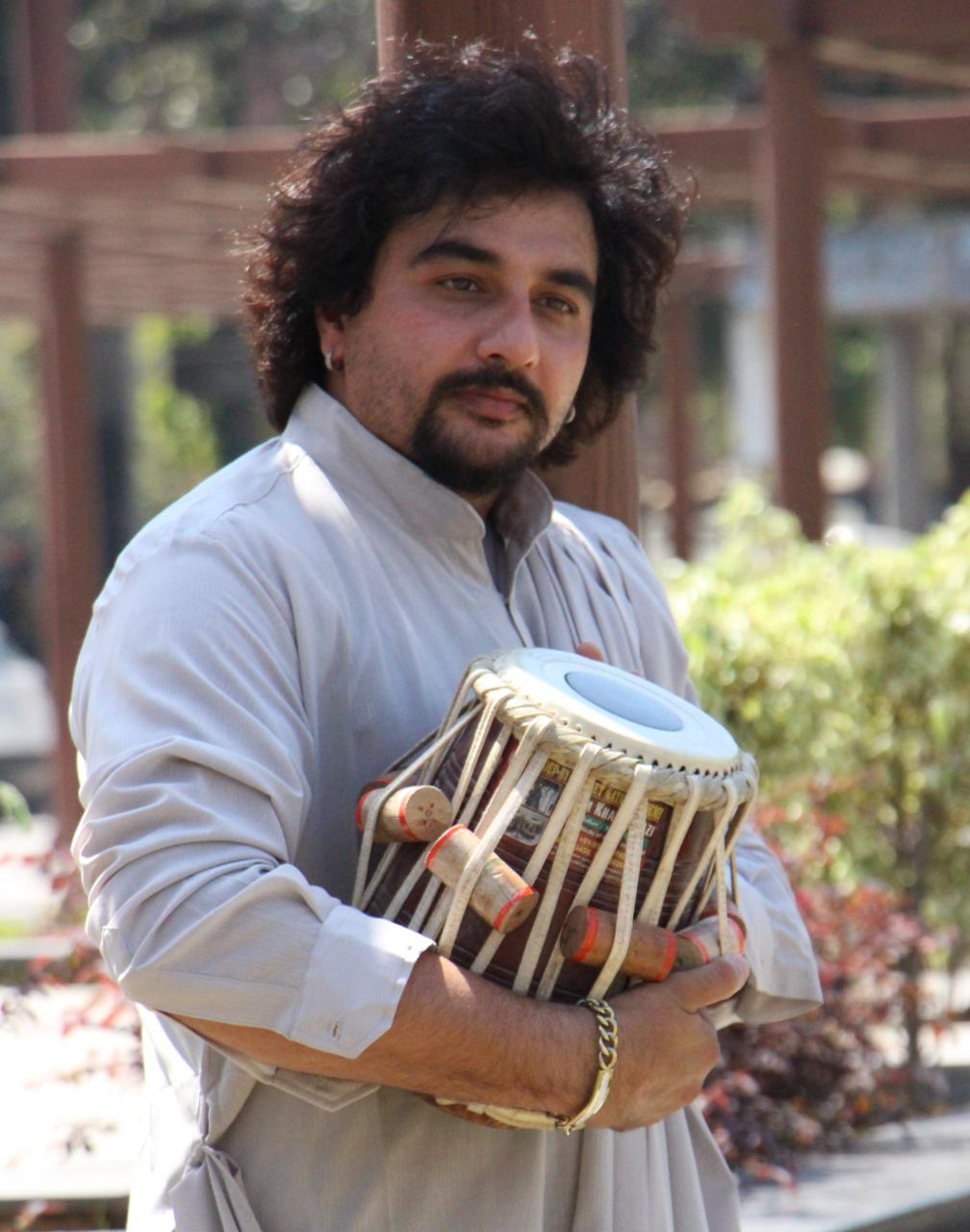
- Avirbhav Verma photoshoot with tabla
- Born: 12 January 1985 (age 41)
- Occupations: Musician, singer
- Father: Pawan Kumar Verma
- Relatives: Sangeet Acharya Ustad Lachman Singh Seen
- Musical career
- Genres: Hindustani classical music, world music, pop
- Website: www.avirbhavverma.com

Avirbhav Verma is an Indian tabla player and percussionist who performs Hindustani classical music. He is the disciple and son of Pawan Kumar Verma, and grandson of Pandit Lachman Singh Seen of Punjab Gharana.

== Early life ==
Avirbhav was born in Chandigarh, India. He received his first tabla lessons from his father, Pawan Kumar Verma. In 2000, after Verma's death, Avirbhav was taught by his grandfather, Pandit Lachman Singh Seen. His mother, Gandharv Verma, is a vocalist and an artist performing on All-India Radio and Doordarshan. His older brother, Swarit Verma is also a notable tabla player and lives in Melbourne, Australia.

== Career ==
Avirbhav has accompanied and performed alongside a number of vocalists and instrumentalists, including:

- Pandit Vishwa Mohan Bhatt (Grammy Award Winner)
- Lt Pandit Mehmood Dholpuri (Harmonium exponent)
- Pandit Ajay Pohankar (Vocalist)
- Pandit Vidyadhar Vyas
- Ustad Salamat Ali Khan
- Pandit Manu Kumar Seen
- Shri Dinesh K Mahavir
- BS Narang
- Ustad Saeed Zafar
- Dhondutai Kulkarni
- Pandit Rajendra Prassanna
- Rishab Prasanna
- Rajesh Prasanna
- Pandit Venkatesh Kumar

He has performed with various French music bands through Alliance Française, including Masaladosa and Erik Truffaz. He has also performed in Auckland, New Zealand, with his brothers Swarit Verma, Basant Madhur, and Deepak Madhur. He joined Delhi Public School, Chandigarh in 2013 as a teacher.

== Awards ==
He received the State Award by the Government of Punjab which was presented to him by the Punjab Chief Minister, Captain Amrinder Singh.
