= Seder-Masochism =

2018 animated feature film by Nina Paley

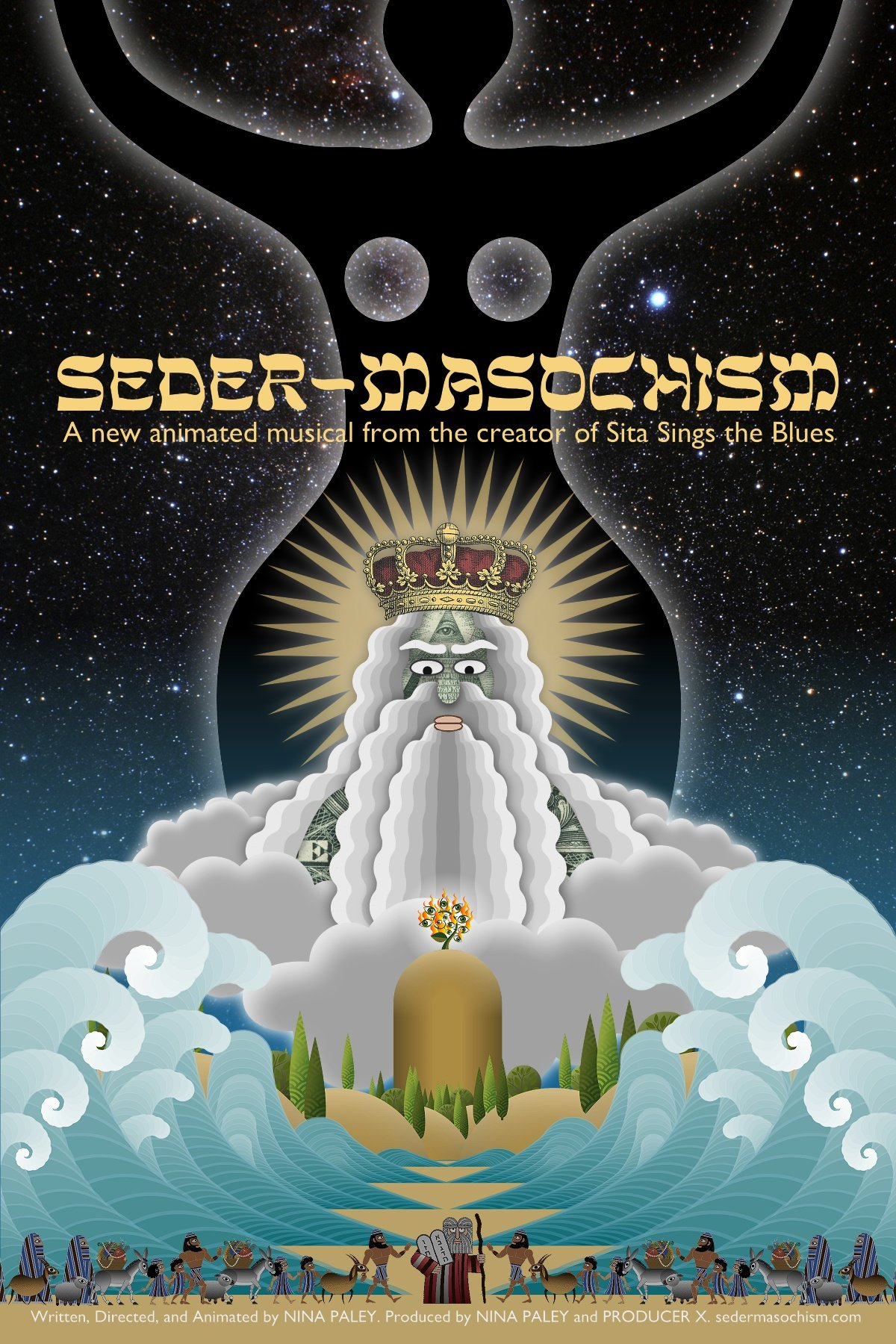
- Poster
- Directed by: Nina Paley
- Written by: Nina Paley
- Produced by: Nina Paley
- Release date: June 11, 2018 (Annecy International Animated Film Festival)
- Running time: 78 minutes
- Country: United States
- Language: English
- Budget: $20,000

Seder-Masochism is a 2018 American animated musical biblical comedy-drama film written, directed, produced and animated by American artist Nina Paley. The film reinterprets the Book of Exodus, especially stories associated with the Passover Seder, such as the death of the Egyptian first-born, and Moses leading the Israelites out of slavery in Egypt. The film depicts these events against a backdrop of widespread worship of the Great Mother Goddess, showing the rise of patriarchy.

Seder-Masochism is Paley's second feature film, following Sita Sings the Blues in 2008, an animated film loosely based on the Ramayana. In a similar fashion to her previous work, Paley mainly uses previously published music in Seder-Masochism, with popular and liturgical songs ranging from 1928 to 2018. She also draws from spoken voice recordings she made in 2011 with her father, Hiram Paley, who is placed in the role of the traditional Hebrew deity. Greg Sextro served as sound designer on the film.

With Theodore Gray, Paley formed PaleGray Labs to create a method for animating embroidery, which they call "embroidermation". In Seder-Masochism, embroidered animation is the basis for one scene: "Chad Gadya".

Debuting in the 2018 film festival season, Seder-Masochism was reviewed positively, with Paley's bright and satirical style compared to Monty Python and others. The film earned the Audience Award at the ANIMATOR film festival in Poland.

== Plot ==
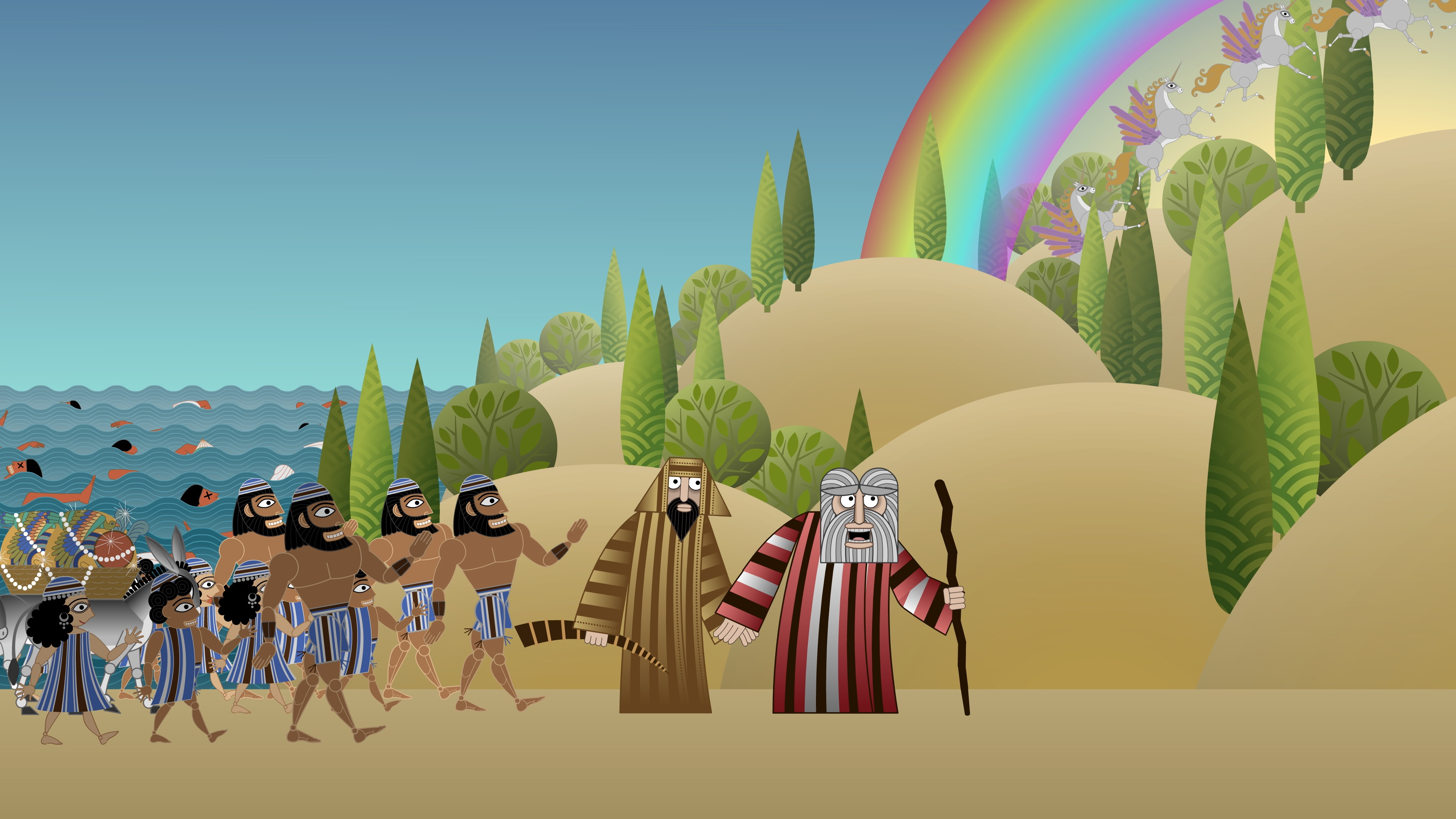
After the crossing of the Red Sea, Moses and Aharon lead the Israelites into the Promised Land

The Book of Exodus is retold by Moses, his brother Aaron, the Angel of Death, Jesus, and the traditional Hebrew God. The ancient mother goddess is cast in a "tragic struggle" against the new patriarchy.

== Cast ==
- Hiram Paley – Our Father
- Nina Paley – Sacrificial Goat
- Barry Gray – Jesus

== Production ==
After Sita Sings the Blues, Paley was criticized by some observers for co-opting the culture of India as an outsider, an assertion with which she strongly disagreed. A recurring theme among the negative comments was "how would you like it if people made a film about your religion?" Paley thought that she would enjoy watching any such film. Accepting this as a challenge, she turned to her own Jewish cultural heritage for her next project: a revisionist retelling of the story of Passover. For inspiration, she also read The Creation of Patriarchy by Gerda Lerner, and The Language of the Goddess by Marija Gimbutas. She concluded that the Book of Exodus represents the final defeat of goddess worship by the patriarchy that had been rising since the agricultural revolution.

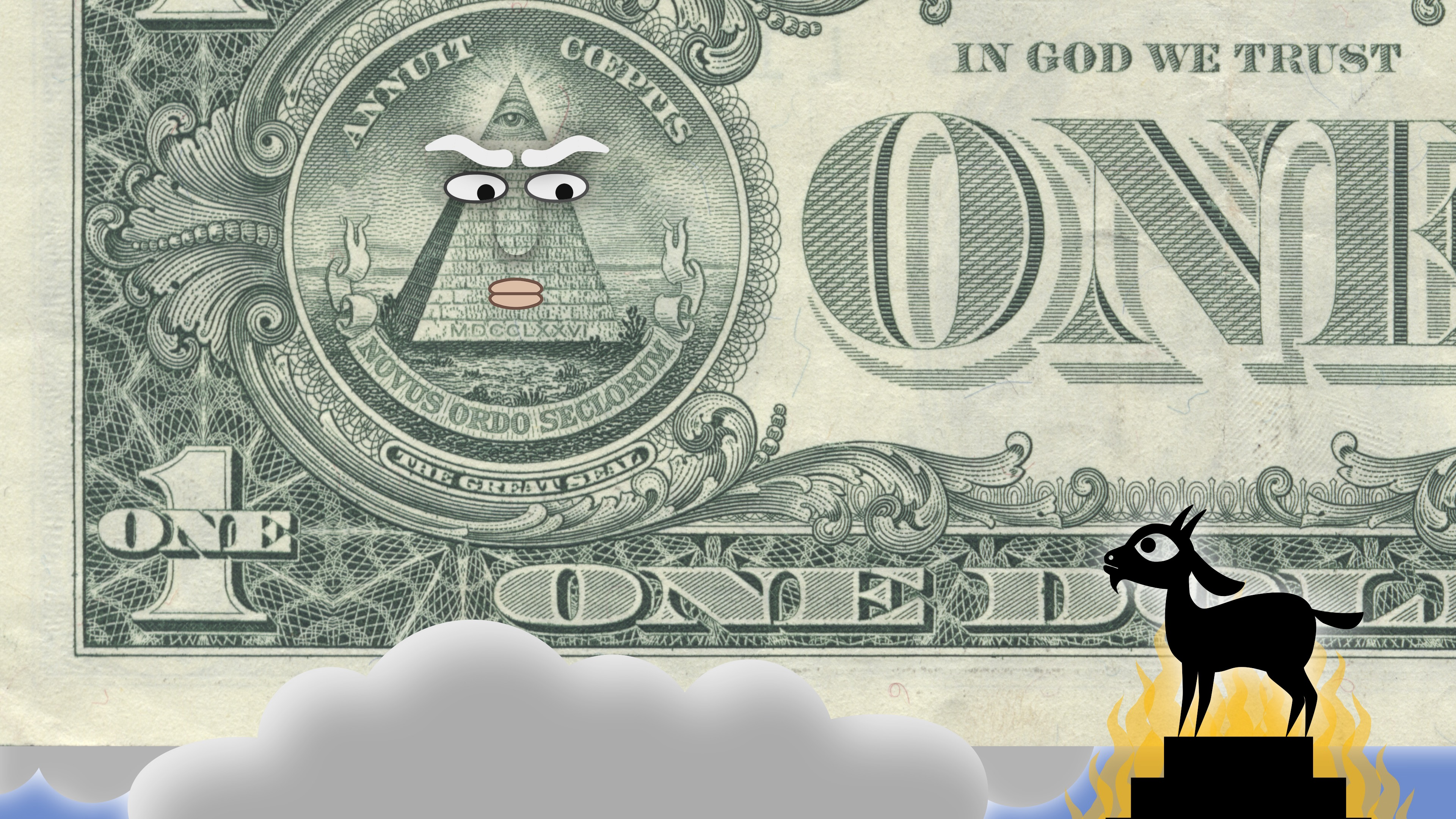
Hiram Paley provides the voice of God, represented here on the US dollar, in conversation with his daughter Nina Paley, depicted as the sacrificial goat

In 2011, Paley interviewed her terminally ill father, Hiram, intending that his voice would serve as the old bearded god figure of the Israelites. For herself, she chose to play the part of a sacrificial goat, because animal sacrifice was essential to many early religions, and because she has been seen as the black sheep of her family. Hiram Paley died in 2012 at the age of 78. Even though her father was a Jewish atheist, the Paley family had celebrated Passover every year so that the children would know their cultural identity. Paley, also a Jewish atheist, weaves the voice recordings of her father into the film as a way to understand the Passover story.

In September 2011, Paley initiated a Kickstarter crowd-funding effort to raise money for "Phase I" of the film, with a goal of $3,600. The campaign brought in $4,146. The intent of Phase I was to make recordings of various family Passover Seder discussions. Ultimately, the project took another direction, and the recordings were not used in the film.

Paley worked on the project over the course of six years, spending about three-and-a-half years animating and producing it. First, she animated some musical numbers – "This Land Is Mine" and "Moses-Exodus" – using Macromedia Flash 8 running on a first-generation Mac Pro tower, but this was not powerful enough to edit 4K resolution video in a practical manner. In 2013, she shifted the project to a second-generation Mac Pro, the vertical cylinder model, and settled on the application Anime Studio Pro. Paley initially found the Anime Studio Pro interface to be frustratingly complex, so she hosted Chilean animator Victor Paredes at her workspace for a week in 2014 to better learn the software. In 2016, Anime Studio Pro became Moho Pro, with an upgraded version. Paley said that it was not until 2017 that she could express herself easily in Moho Pro.

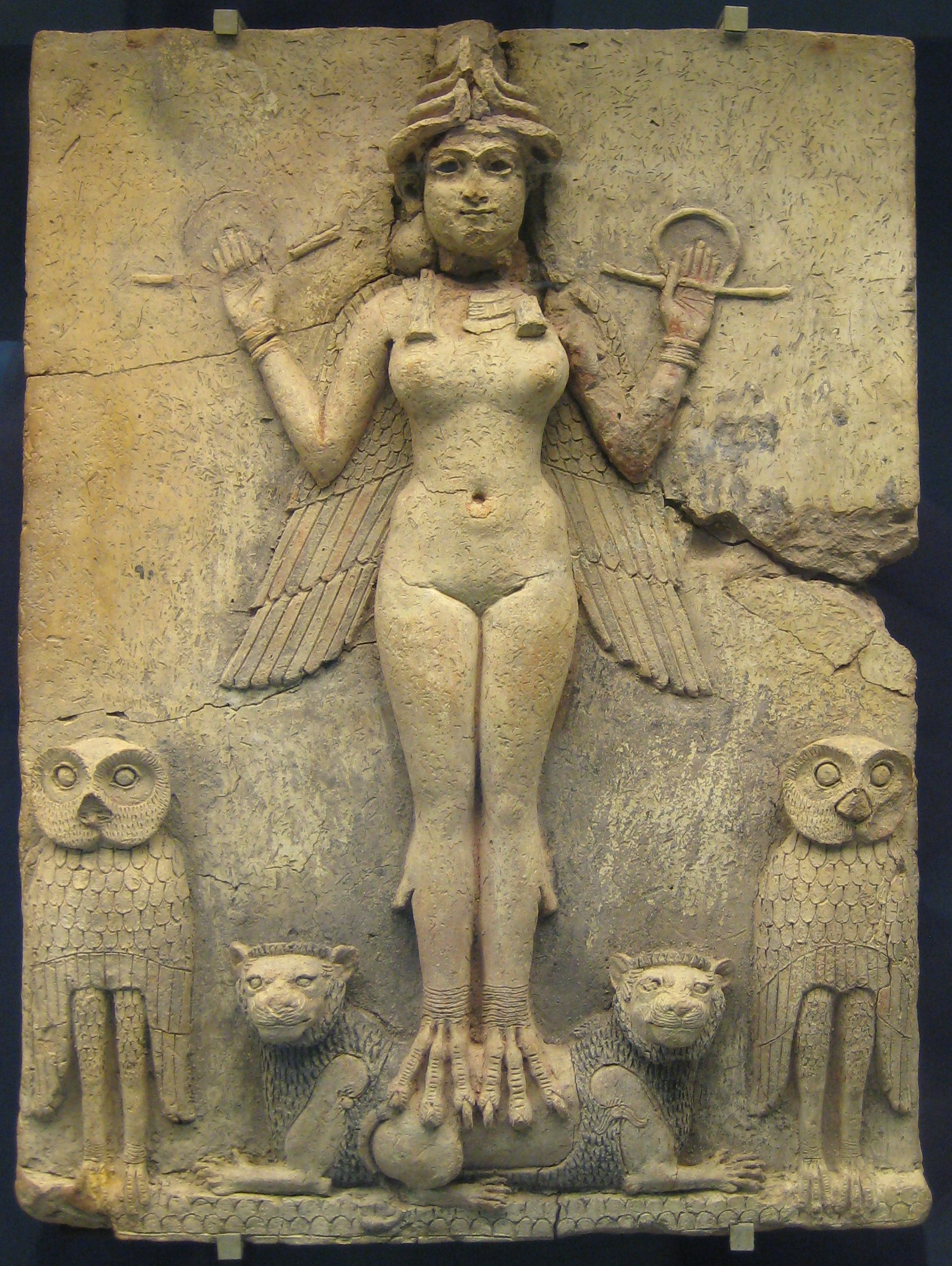
"Queen of the Night", Mesopotamia (1800 BC)

Paley's animation of the figure

In November 2017, Paley wrote that much of the project had been completed without a "coherent story", despite the attempt to tie it together in the loose form of a Passover Seder. She decided instead "to articulate the Exodus from the Goddesses' point of view", the goddesses who were at that time worshiped in Egypt as Hathor, Isis, Nut, Sekhmet, and others. This turned her film into a narrative "about patriarchy and the suppression of the Goddess".

After showing rough cuts of the new concept to friends, Paley decided to bring more goddess images into the film. In late 2017/early 2018, she imported high-resolution photos of ancient goddess figurines into the graphics editor GIMP to remove backgrounds, then she exported the resulting PNG files to Moho. In Moho, Paley assigned "little skeleton" points on the images to establish how the goddess figurines could bend, and she created additional layers for smaller movements such as eye blinks and smiling/frowning. She offered these individual goddess animations for free on her blog. Among the goddess figurines appearing in the film are the Seated Woman of Çatalhöyük (6,000 BC, Turkey), the Venus of Willendorf (30,000 BC, Austria), and the Venus of Hohle Fels (35,000 BC, Germany).

The final assembly and editing of the film were performed on Final Cut Pro X, which Paley said was "horrible" in its interface but powerful in its processing of 4K video: 3840×2160 pixels. In all, Paley estimated the film's final budget at $20,000.

=== Embroidery animation ===
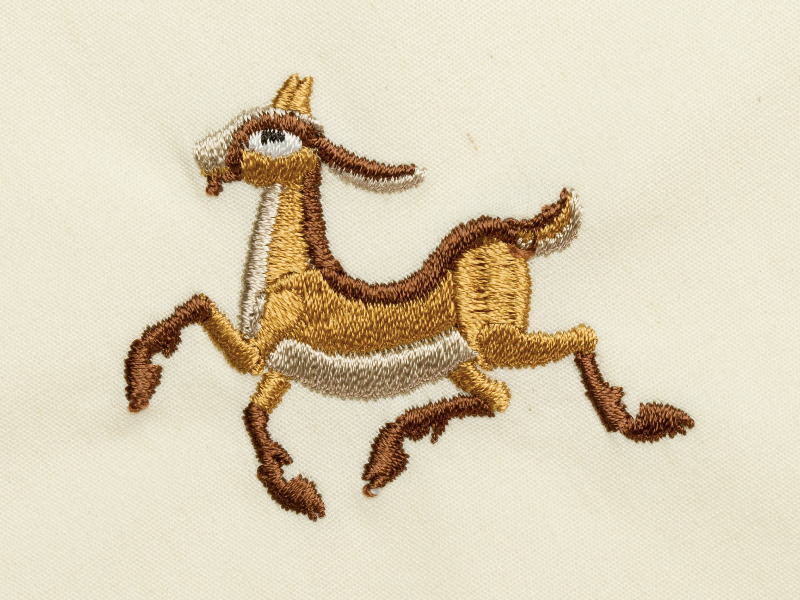
An embroidered goat used in the "Chad Gadya" animated short

Paley teamed with science writer and programmer Theodore Gray to develop "embroidermation": an automated method of animating embroidery. In 2015 after working for a year and a half, the PaleGray Labs team produced a Passover-themed animated short, "Chad Gadya", intended to serve as intermission for Seder-Masochism. Paley created animated figures in Macromedia Flash 8, then Gray imported the resulting vector files into Wolfram Mathematica, a powerful visualization program which he co-created. The figures were rendered as polygons in Mathematica, then a custom application was written to properly align the embroidery stitch direction, different for each polygon. Using an embroidery machine, a total of 516 embroidered figures were stitched into 86 matzoh covers (decorative cloths for holding matzoh during Passover), then each completed figure was photographed to create one frame of animation. The "Chad Gadya" scene runs just under 3 minutes, accompanied by the children's Passover song, "Chad Gadya", sung by Moishe Oysher and recorded in the 1950s.

== Release ==
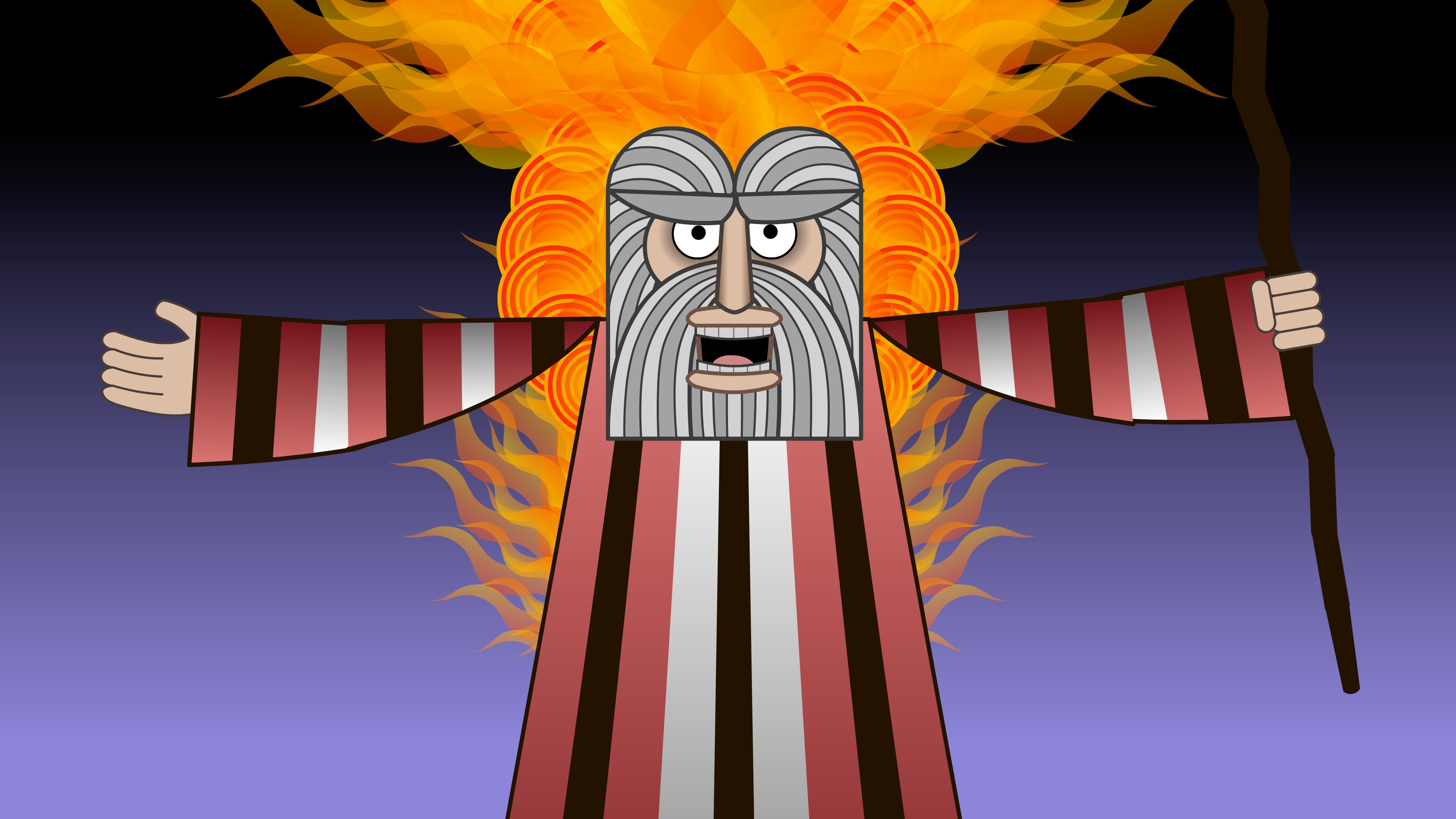
Moses in front of the Pillar of Fire

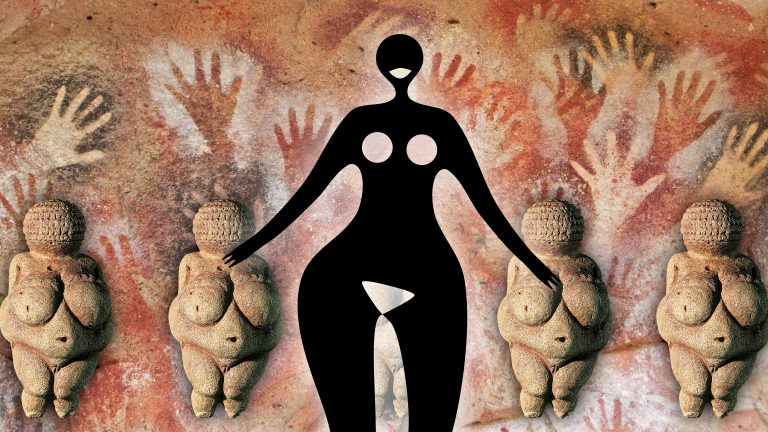
Ancient goddess worship depicted in the scene "Paroles, Paroles"

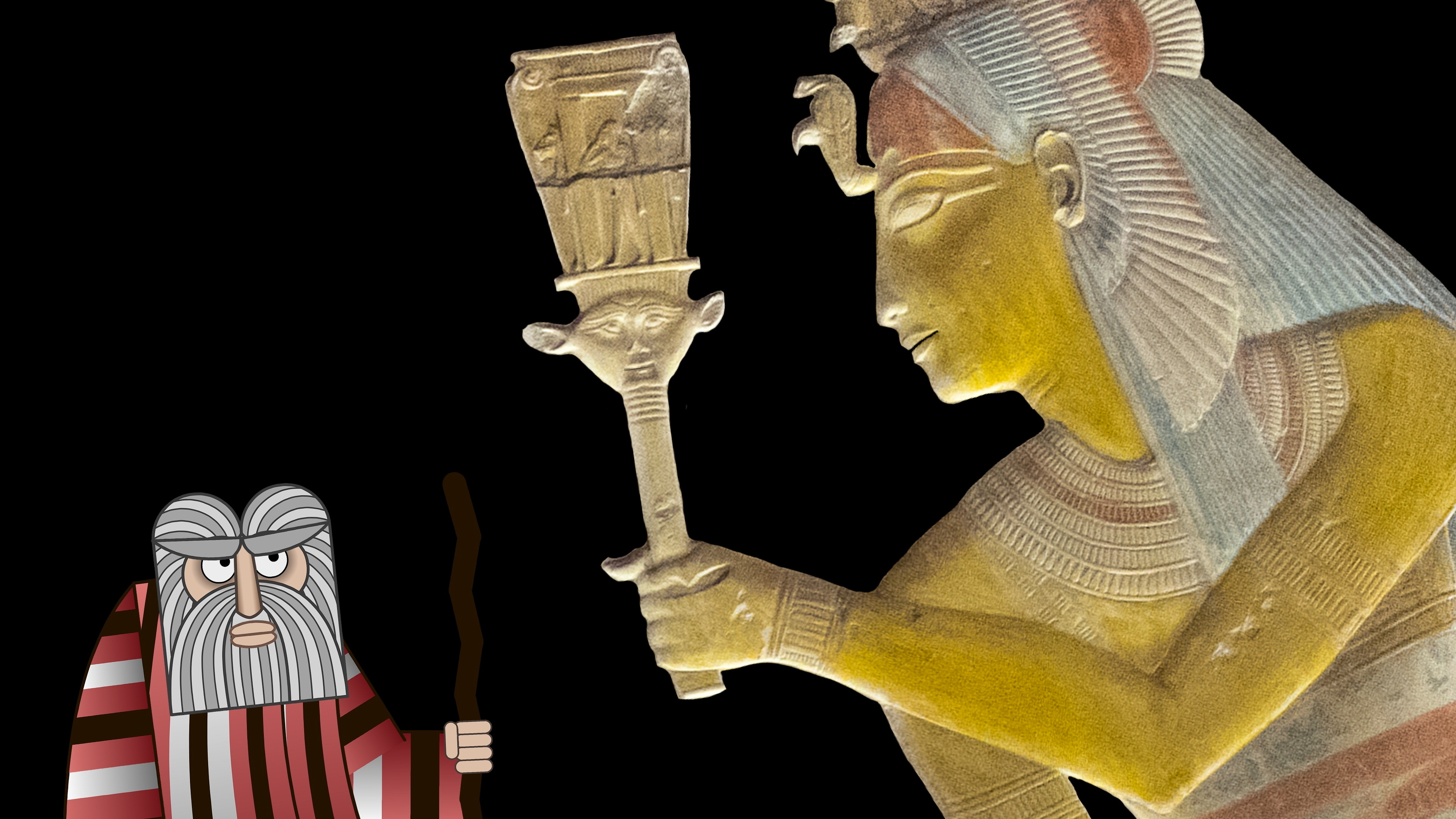
Moses is entreated by Hathor to believe in the goddess

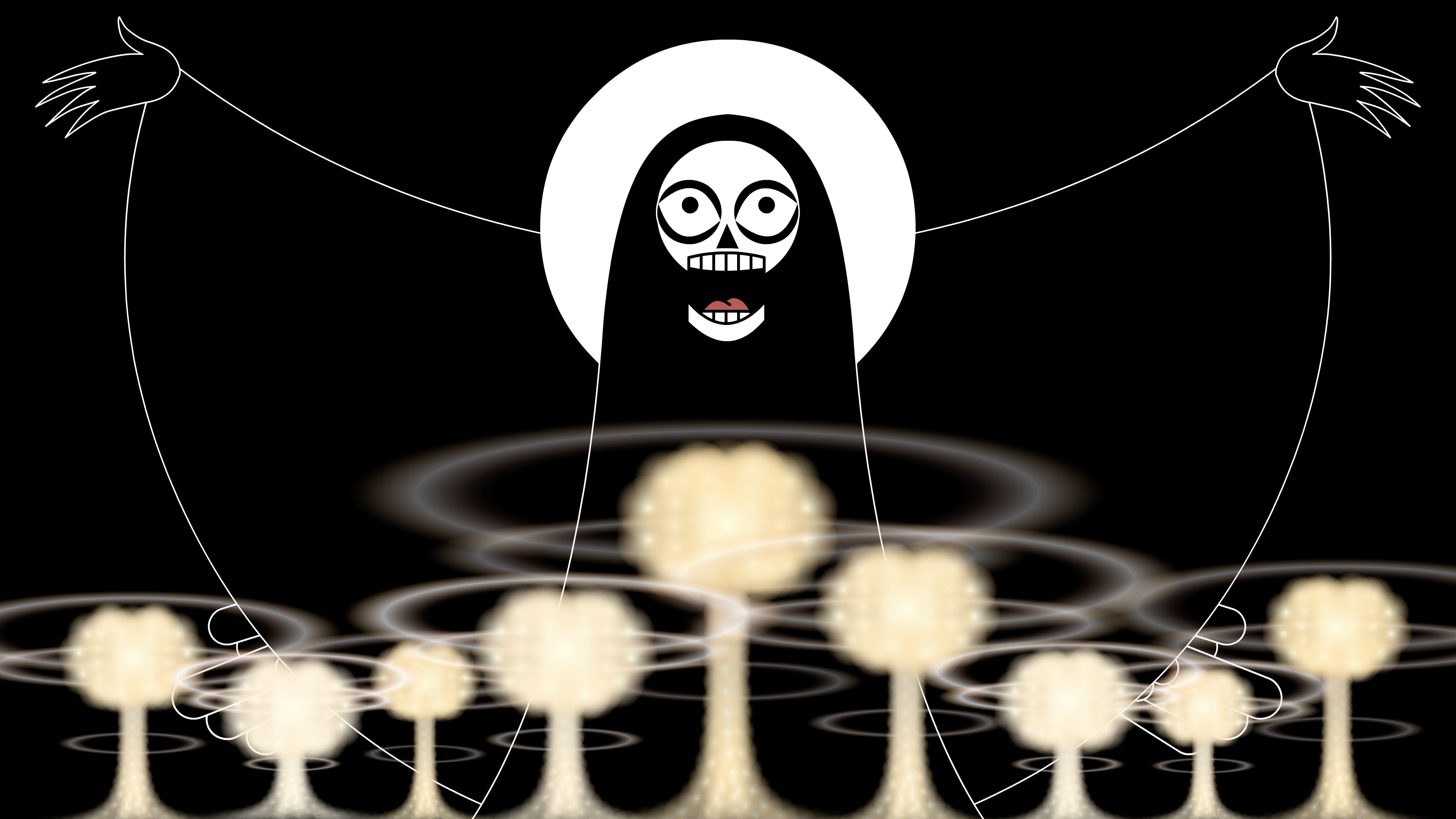
The Angel of Death sings above nuclear destruction

When the film was complete, Paley determined to wait until it had been screened at film festivals before she offered the film for free online in the same manner as Sita Sings the Blues. Earlier, she uploaded some scenes-in-progress to Vimeo and YouTube, including the opening "God-Mother" number in 2017, and "Death of the Firstborn Egyptians" in 2014, the latter gaining 2.7 million views by August 2020. The scene "This Land Is Mine" was first posted in 2012, and by 2014 had received 10 million views, with more viewers added during every news cycle highlighting the Israeli–Palestinian conflict.

=== Screenings ===
- June 11–15, 2018 – France: Annecy International Animated Film Festival
- July 8–9, 2018 – Poland: ANIMATOR festival
- August 7–11, 2018 – Israel: Animix Festival
- September 19–30, 2018 – Greece: Athens International Film Festival
- September 26–30, 2018 – Greece: Animasyros (Ermoupoli)
- September 27–29, 2018 – Canada: Ottawa International Animation Festival
- October 3–4, 2018 – Canada: Vancouver International Film Festival
- October 4–14, 2018 – Spain: Sitges Film Festival
- October 4–14, 2018 – United States: Mill Valley Film Festival
- October 19–21, 2018 – United States: Animation is Film (Los Angeles)
- October 22–26, 2018 – Italy: VIEW Conference (Turin)
- October 24–27, 2018 – Israel: AniNation International Animation Festival
- October 25–28, 2018 – Norway: Fredrikstad Animation Festival
- October 23 – November 21, 2018 – Australia: Jewish International Film Festival
- October 26 – November 3, 2018 – Russia: Big Cartoon Festival (Moscow)
- October 28 – November 3, 2018 – Armenia: ReAnimania (Yerevan)
- November 20–25, 2018 – Poland: Etiuda & Anima (Kraków)
- November 21–25, 2018 – Canada: Les Sommets du Cinema d’Animation (Montreal)
- November 28 – December 2, 2018 – Hungary: Anilogue
- December 13, 2018 – France: Le Carrefour du Cinéma d’Animation (Paris)
- January 13–14, 2019 – United States: New York Jewish Film Festival
- January 10–24, 2019 – United States: Miami Jewish Film Festival
- March 17, 2019 - Austria: Tricky Women Festival
- October 12–13, 2019 - United States: Cleveland Cinematheque

=== Public domain dedication ===
On January 24, 2019, Paley dedicated the film to the public domain, releasing it under a CC0 license and uploading the master files to the Internet Archive. Paley clarified that the music used in the film was still copyrighted by its original authors, and this was one of the reasons she had no plans to pursue commercial distribution of the film.

== Reception ==
Following June 2018 showing at Annecy International Animated Film Festival, The Hollywood Reporter wrote that the film was "completely irreverent, occasionally hilarious and politically evocative", and that it "defies definition" with its different aspects of musical comedy, psychedelic cartoon, and "insolent" religious epic. Paley is observed to have "lots of fun" turning Bible events "into Busby Berkeley-style song-and-dance numbers." Spain's El Mundo newspaper compared the film's irony and apparent naïveté to works by the Marx Brothers, Italian playwright Dario Fo, and Monty Python, writing that Paley applies unprejudiced and sharp commentary to the Jewish story while remaining bright and ridiculous. French film website Courte-Focale compared Seder-Masochism to Monty Python's Life of Brian, writing that Paley brought a "fiercely humorous" spirit to the task of attacking patriarchal religion, an attack carried out with "acuteness and precision" in a way that disarms her opponents and yields a hilarious result. Greek animator Vassilis Kroustallis said that Paley's second film "is another bold attempt... to associate the catastrophe that religion may bring with the male ego." He wrote that the musical choreography is good but the editing suffers from the juxtaposition of different scenes. Variety wrote that the film was "delightfully impudent" and inventive, despite being "episodic and uneven" in its presentation as a series of short scenes.

In Poznań, Poland, at the ANIMATOR film festival, Seder-Masochism earned the Audience Award for Feature Film.

== Music ==
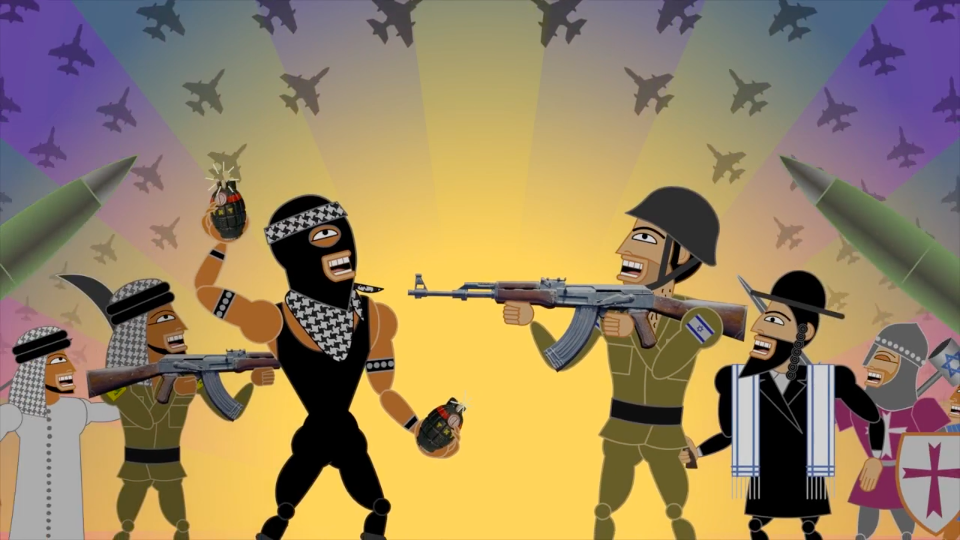
A scene from the musical number "This Land Is Mine"

Paley spent $70,000 to secure the music rights to Sita Sings the Blues, just to distribute it freely, so for Seder-Masochism she turned to the parody defense in fair use: a parody of a copyrighted work can be considered fair use. As a result, she did not try to secure the rights to the many recordings she used in the film. She told Variety that anyone who is interested can perform the legal work to clear the music rights, after which that person or corporation will be able to distribute the film commercially or license it for distribution.

The song "This Land Is Mine" came first in Paley's production process; she used it to frame a scene in which a succession of warring men claims the Holy Land as theirs. The music is the main theme of the 1960 film Exodus, composed by Austrian Ernest Gold, with words added later by Pat Boone, which he sang and released as a single titled "The Exodus Song". Boone, an American Christian, said he wrote the lyrics in 25 minutes on Christmas Eve, on the back of a Christmas card, which he later sent to Yad Vashem, the Holocaust memorial in Jerusalem. The version Paley used in Seder-Masochism is a cover by Boone's friend Andy Williams, released in 1962 under the title "The Exodus Song (This Land Is Mine)", as part of his album Moon River and Other Great Movie Themes, the album reaching number 3 on the Billboard Top 200, selling more than two million copies by 1967. In the 1960s, the song became a Zionist anthem. Paley parodies the song's Zionist theme to show the senselessness of war in the Middle East: the scene ends in atomic destruction, with nobody winning except the Angel of Death.

Paley commissioned a song for the film from New York-based rock musician Todd Michaelsen, who had earlier collaborated on a song for Sita Sings the Blues, but Paley eventually decided not to use Michaelsen's song. She said that she prefers "songs that have a different original meaning", so that her animation adds a second meaning, yielding greater depth.

For her dancing goddesses number, animated in early 2018, Paley chose a song from the 1976 film Car Wash: "You Gotta Believe", written by Norman Whitfield and performed by the Pointer Sisters, using Rose Royce as the backing band. In Car Wash, Paley said the song is used to "urge activist men to stand up for their activist sisters", but in Seder-Masochism it is an ultimately unsuccessful plea to Moses to embrace goddess worship.

The following recordings appear in the film credits:

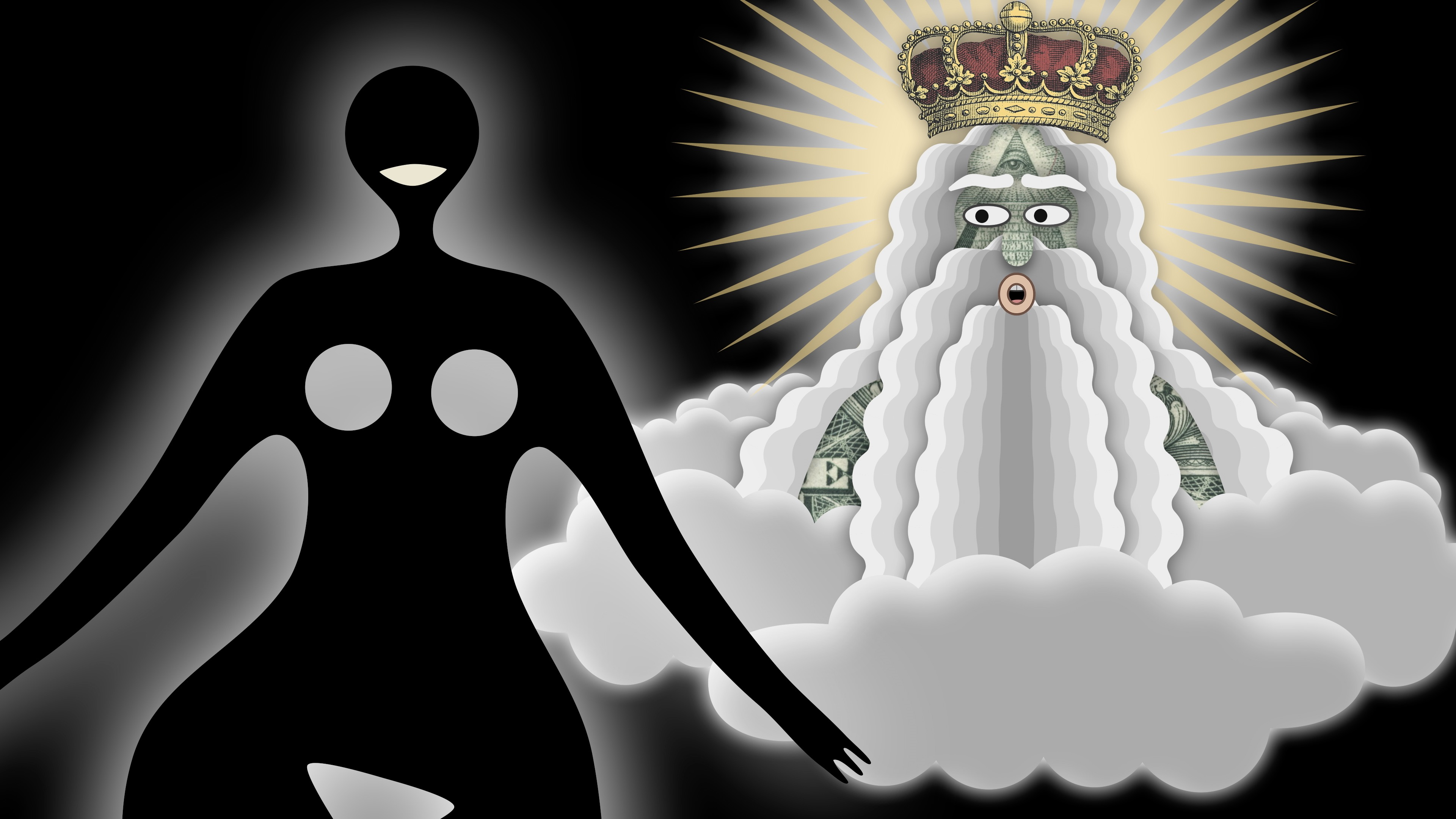
The Great Mother and the Hebrew God

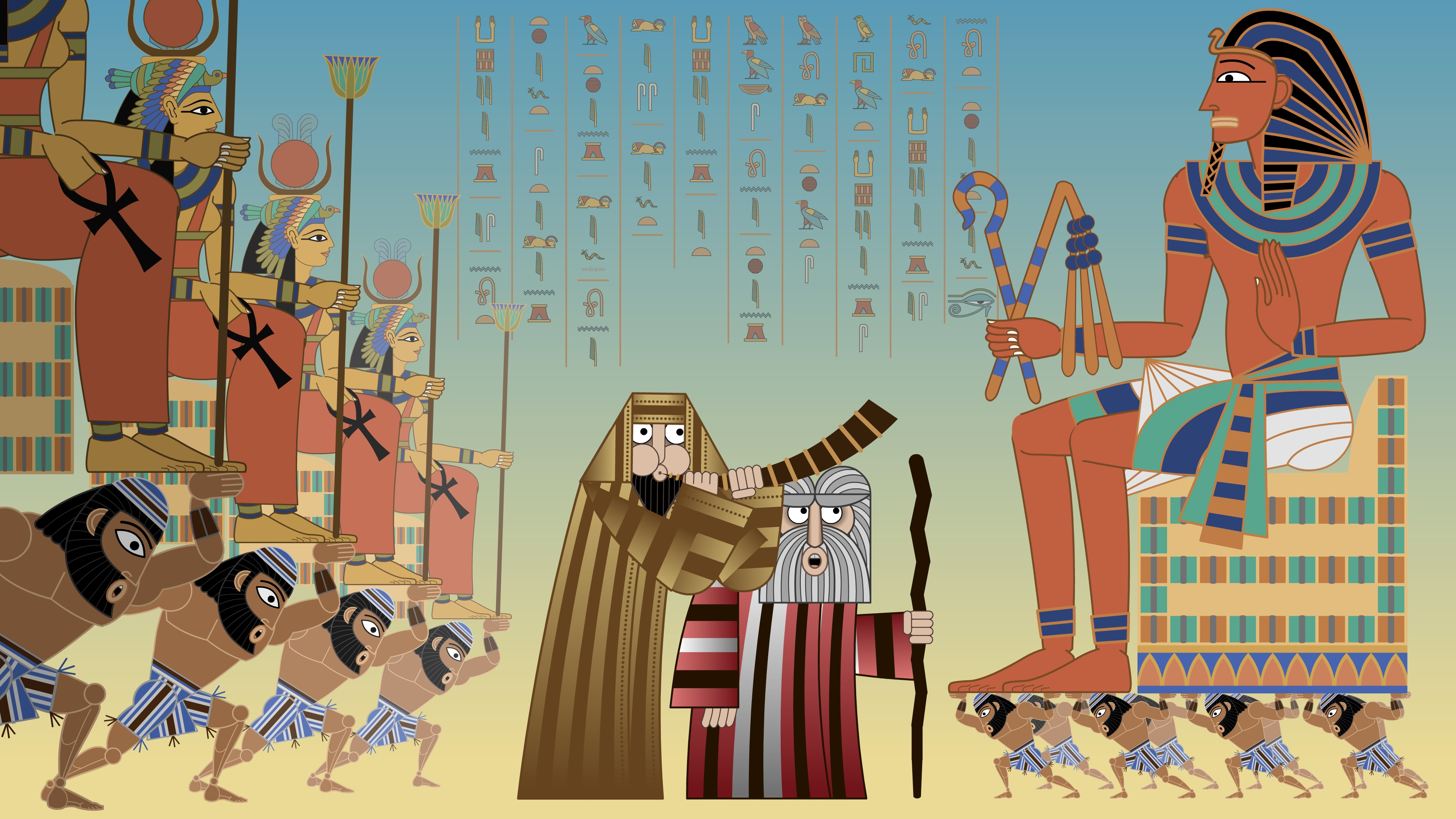
Aaron blows the shofar, with Moses and Pharaoh

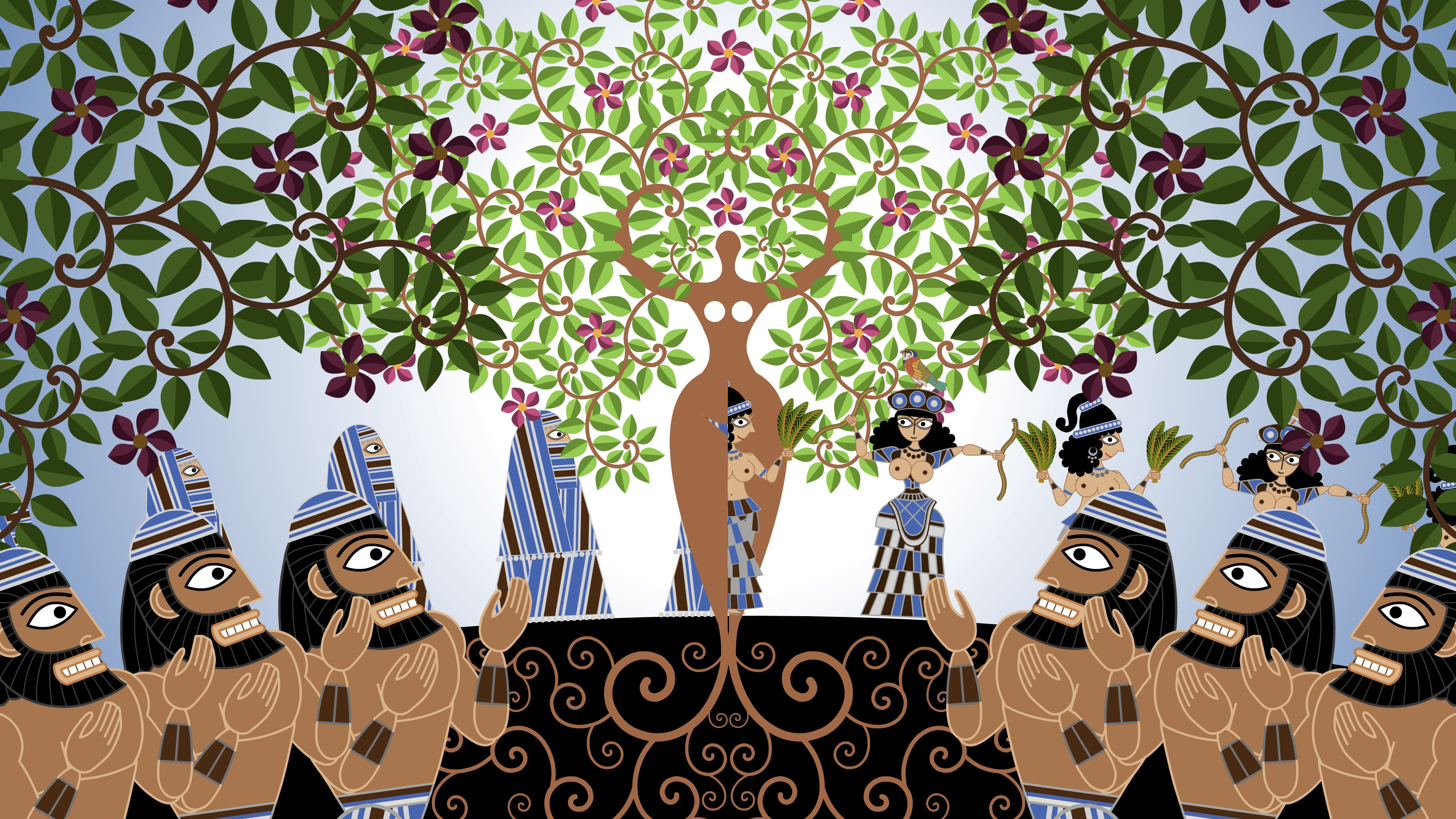
Hebrew women transformed by the Goddess

- ca. 1975 – "Kalimankou Denkou" (Godmother Denkou), performed by the Bulgarian State Television Female Vocal Choir. Yanka Roupkina, soloist
- 1952 – "Moses Supposes", vocals by Gene Kelly and Donald O'Connor, from the film Singin' in the Rain
- ca. 1955 – "The Moishe Oysher Seder", spoken by Barry Gray, sung by Moishe Oysher and the Abraham Nadel Chorus
- 1976 – "You Gotta Believe", sung by the Pointer Sisters with Rose Royce playing the instruments
- ca. 1958 – "Go Down Moses", performed by Louis Armstrong and Sy Silver's Orchestra
- ca. 1965 – "Tijuana Taxi", performed by Herb Alpert and the Tijuana Brass
- ca. 1970s – assorted Muzak
- ca. 1933 – "Blood Red River Blues", performed by Josh White
- ca. 2004 – "Frogs", by DJ Zeph, featuring Azeem
- 1982 – "Insects", performed by Oingo Boingo
- ca. 1990s – "Dead Animals", performed by Mental Decay
- ca. 1968 – "Helter Skelter", performed by the Beatles
- 1928 – "Hail, Hail, the Gang's All Here", performed by Nat Shilkret and the Victor Orchestra
- 1972 – "Who Turned The Light Out On My Life?", performed by Daniel Boone
- ca. 2012 – "The Web" and "Melt Away", performed by the Duke of Uke and His Novelty Orchestra
- 1978 – "I Will Survive", performed by Gloria Gaynor
- 1973 – "Free to Be... You and Me", performed by the New Seekers
- ca. 1975 – "Erghen Diado" (Diaphonic Chant), performed by the Bulgarian State Television Female Vocal Choir
- ca. 1966 – "Reach Out (I'll Be There)", performed by the Four Tops
- ca. 1980 – "Woman", performed by John Lennon
- ca. 1975 – "Schopska Pesen" (Song of Schopsko), performed by the Bulgarian State Television Female Vocal Choir
- 1988 – "Used To Love Her", performed by Guns N' Roses
- 1968 – "Your Time Is Gonna Come", performed by Led Zeppelin
- 1973 – "Paroles, paroles", sung by Dalida, with spoken word by Alain Delon
- 1976 – "The Things We Do For Love", performed by 10cc
- 2018 – "God Is Male", lyrics by Connie Bryson and Nina Paley, music by Nina Paley, organ performed by Camille Goudeseune, vocals by Nina Paley and Emilia Cataldo
- ca. 1955 – "Chad Gadya", performed by Moishe Oysher with the Abraham Nadel Chorus
- ca. 1998 – "L’Shana Haba’a", performed by the Breslau Synagogue Chorus
- 1962 – "This Land Is Mine", performed by Andy Williams
- ca. 1954 – "Old-Time Religion", performed by the Caravans
