= Sita Sings the Blues =

2008 animated film by Nina Paley

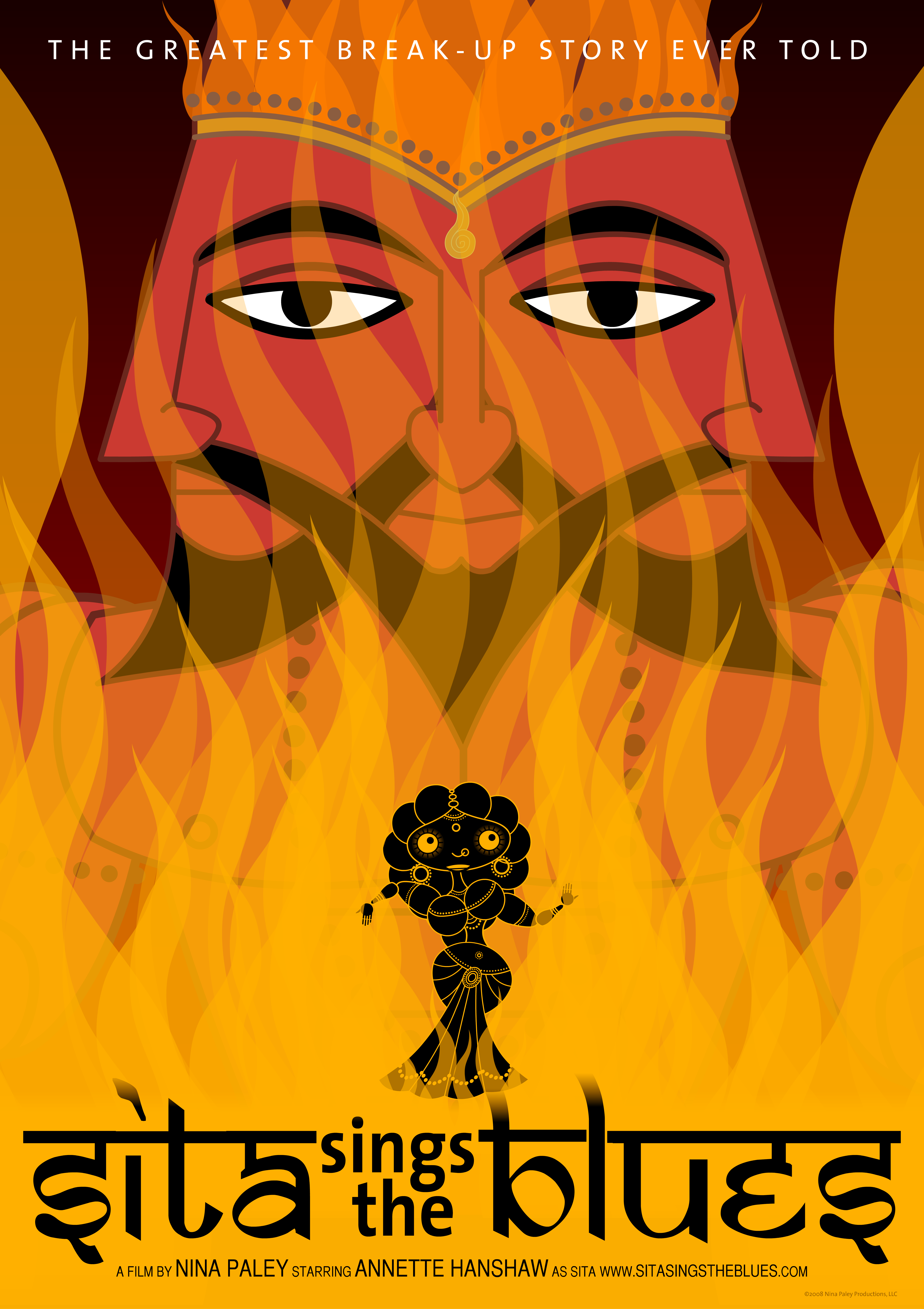
- Poster for Sita Sings the Blues
- Directed by: Nina Paley
- Written by: Nina Paley
- Produced by: Nina Paley
- Starring: Sanjiv Jhaveri; Nina Paley; Deepti Gupta; Debargo Sanyal; Reena Shah; Pooja Kumar; Aladdin Ullah
- Narrated by: Aseem Chhabra; Bhavana Nagulapally; Manish Acharya
- Music by: Annette Hanshaw et al.
- Distributed by: GKIDS
- Release date: February 11, 2008 (Berlin)
- Running time: 82 minutes
- Country: United States
- Language: English
- Budget: $290,000

Sita Sings the Blues is a 2008 American independent animated musical romantic comedy-drama film written, directed, produced and animated by American artist Nina Paley. It intersperses events from the Ramayana, light-hearted but knowledgeable discussion of historical background by a trio of Indian shadow puppets, musical interludes voiced with tracks by Annette Hanshaw and scenes from the artist's own life. The ancient mythological and modern biographical plot are parallel tales, sharing numerous themes.

== Plot ==
=== The Ramayana ===
Sita Sings the Blues (2008) by Nina Paley, full film (with audio muted due to copyright problems with some of the music)

The film uses a pared-down adaptation of the legend that retains many of its finer details while adopting a perspective sympathetic towards Sita; in the director's words, the film is "a tale of truth, justice and a woman's cry for equal treatment."

The plot joins the legend at the exile of the prince Rama from the capital city of Ayodhya, at the behest of king Dasharatha's favorite queen, Kaikeyi. Having earned the right to two favors by saving the Dasharatha's life, Kaikeyi attempts to secure her own son's inheritance over the eldest and favorite, Rama, by ordering him banished from the court. Sita, Rama's wife, determines to accompany her beloved husband, although the woods are dangerous and overrun with demons and evil spirits.

The demon king Ravana, encouraged by his spiteful ogress sister, Shurpanakha, hears of Sita's beauty and determines to kidnap her. He sends a golden hind, Maricha, past their dwelling to distract Rama, who tries to impress Sita by hunting the hind into the woods. In his absence, Ravana abducts Sita and demands that she submit to him willingly. Sita remains staunchly devoted to Rama and refuses to entertain the idea; Ravana sets a deadline for the ultimatum and Sita waits faithfully for Rama to rescue her.

Aided by the monkey prince Hanuman, Rama eventually discovers Sita's location and brings the monkey army to assist in her rescue. Ravana is slain and Sita is restored to her husband, although the people of Ayodhya express serious doubts concerning her fidelity during her confinement. She submits to a trial by fire, a test of her purity; upon throwing herself into the flames, she is immediately rescued by the gods, who all proclaim her devotion and fidelity.

She accompanies Rama back to the palace and soon falls pregnant. Rama overhearing one of his subjects beating and ejecting an unfaithful consort (claiming he is no Rama to accept and forgive her unfaithfulness), he reluctantly orders his brother Lakshman to abandon Sita in the forest. In the company of ascetics owned by the Sage Valmiki, she gives birth to her twin sons, Lava and Kusha, and raises them to love and praise their absent father.

Years later, Rama overhears their hymns of adoration to their father and locates their dwelling. Distressed and disappointed by Rama's actions during her reunion with Rama, Sita prays to the earth goddess, Bhumi-Devi, to swallow her as final proof of her purity and devotion, and the prayer is duly answered, despite the pleas of Rama and Lakshman.

=== Contemporary parallel ===
In an episode taken from the director's own life, animator Nina Paley starts the film living happily in a San Francisco apartment with her husband and cat. Her husband then accepts the offer of a six-month contract working in Trivandrum, India, and moves there alone to take up the position. After a month of no contact, he calls to inform his wife that the contract has been extended another year.

Bewildered by his callous indifference to their separation, Nina sublets their apartment, leaves their beloved cat behind, and joins her husband in India. Upon her arrival, he appears deeply unenthusiastic to be reunited and demonstrates neither affection nor sexual interest. A while later, Nina flies to a meeting in New York, where she receives a brief e-mail from her husband telling her that their relationship is over. Sad and alone, she stays in New York, finding comfort in a new cat and her study of the Ramayana.

== Cast ==
- Sanjiv Jhaveri as Dave, Dasharatha, Ravana, Dhobi, and Valmiki
- Nina Paley as Nina
- Aseem Chhabra as Shadow Puppet 1 (Hanuman)
- Bhavana Nagulapally as Shadow Puppet 2 (Sita)
- Manish Acharya as Shadow Puppet 3 (Rama)
- Deepti Gupta as Kaikeyi
- Debargo Sanyal as Rama
- Reena Shah as Sita (Speaking)
- Annette Hanshaw as Sita (Singing) (archived recordings)
- Pooja Kumar as Shurpanakha
- Alaudin Ullah as Maricha and Hanuman
- Nitya Vidyasagar as Lava and Kusha

== Style and narrative ==
The film uses several different styles of animation to separate and identify the parallel narratives.

=== Episodes from the Ramayana ===
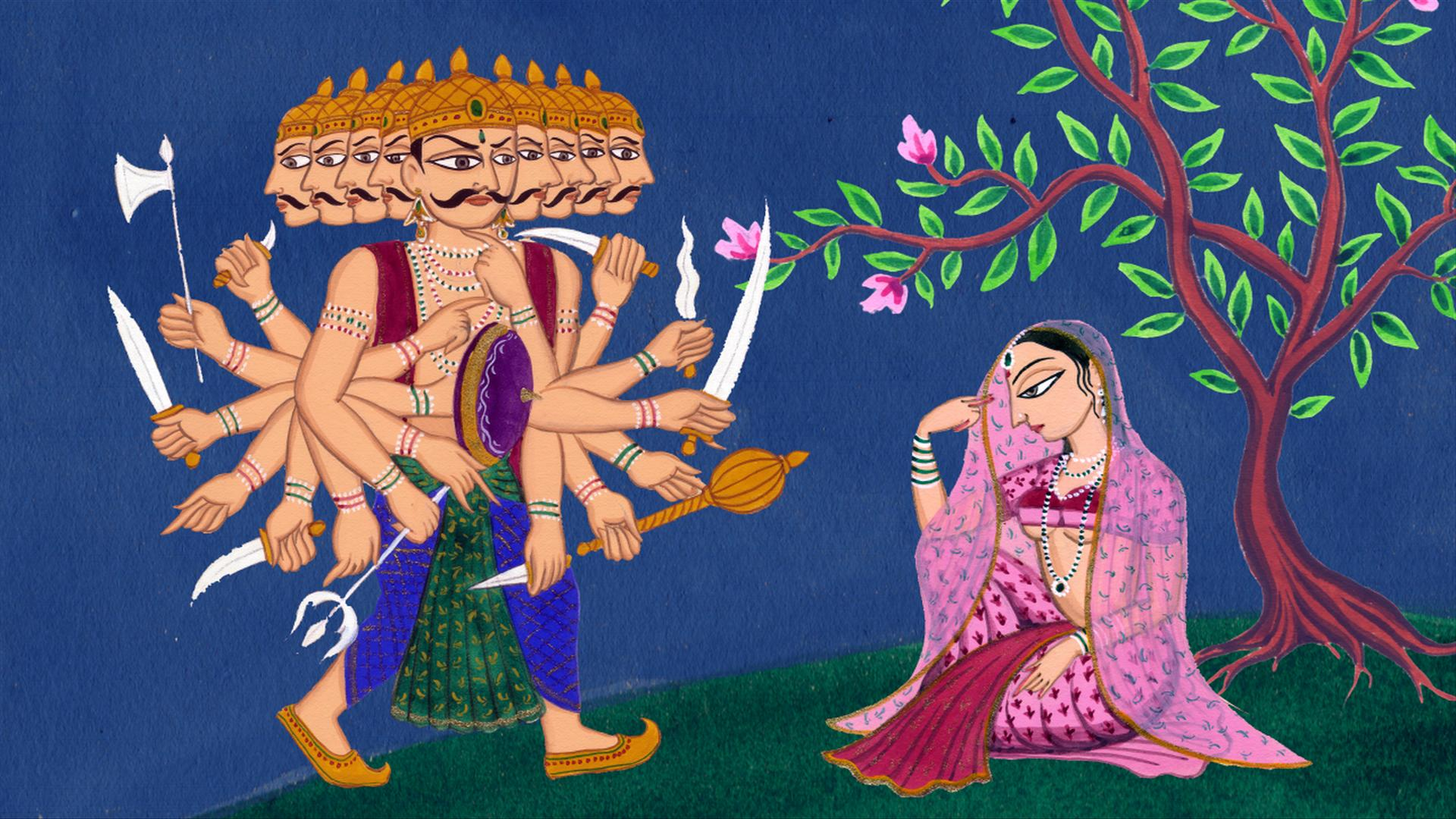
Ravana approaches Sita during her captivity.

Episodes with dialogue from the Ramayana are enacted using painted figures of the characters in profile, which strongly resemble the 18th-century Indian tradition of Rajput painting. The Rajput style of brush painting was principally enacted on manuscripts and commonly employed in the telling of epics such as the Ramayana. In the film, they serve as a more traditional style of dramatic narrative, although the dialogue is frequently ironic, inappropriately modern, or otherwise humorous.

The background in each scene is usually static and the poses of each character are kept minimal, with movement achieved by simply transporting the character across the screen in its set position. Speech is enacted by alternating the set pose of the face with a slightly liquified version where the jaw is lower.

=== Narration and discourse on the Ramayana ===
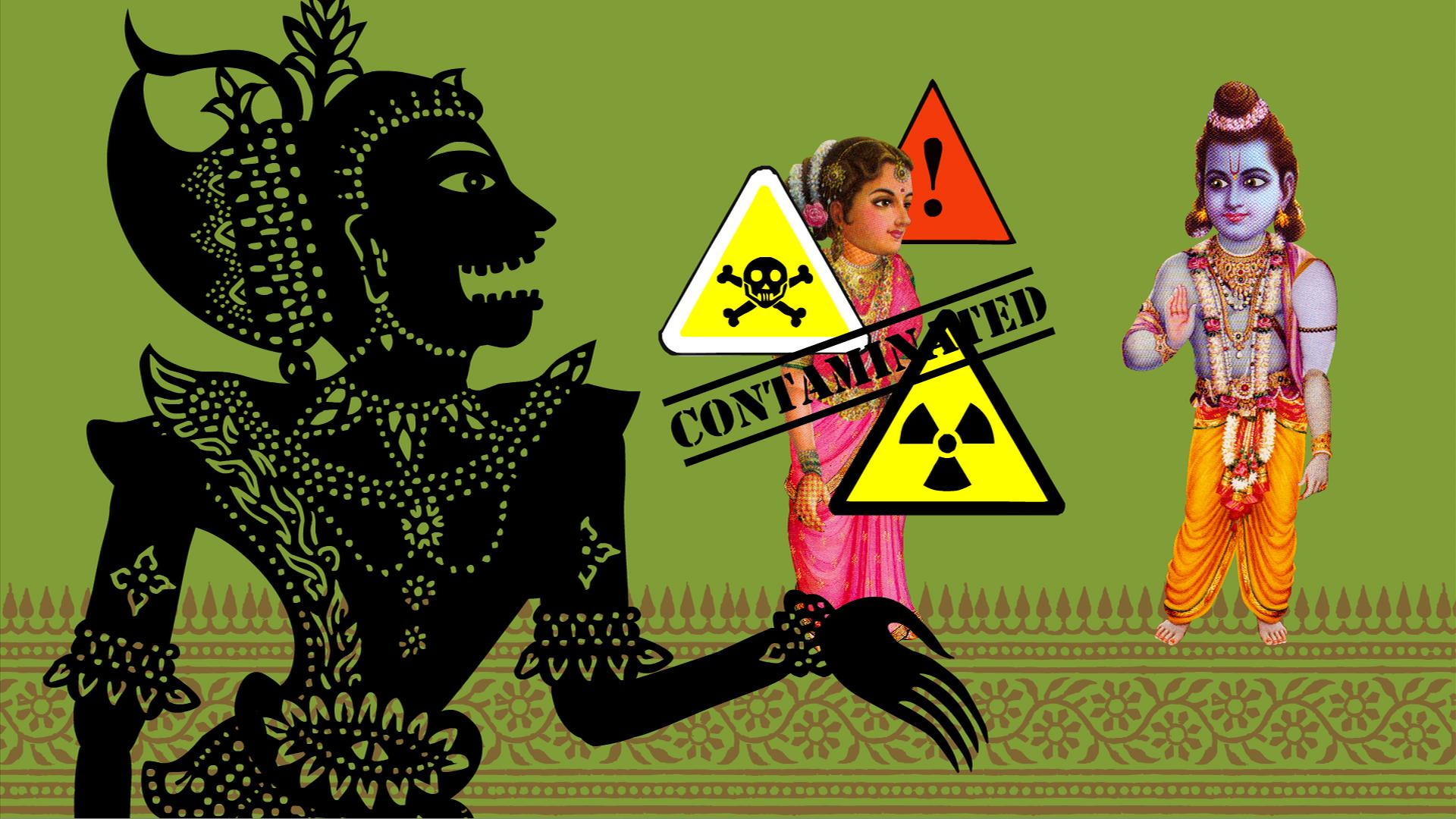
The shadow puppet narrators discuss Rama's attitude towards Sita after her trial by fire.

Three traditional Indian silhouette shadow puppets link episodes of the Ramayana with a lively, unscripted discussion of their personal impressions and knowledge of the epic. They provide context and commentary for the story, which has innumerable incarnations and regional variations.

The voices were provided by Aseem Chhabra, Bhavana Nagulapally, and Manish Acharya, all from different regions of India and who had learned different versions of the Ramayana. Paley said in 2024 about the selection of the voices that "I really lucked out because I was hoping they would argue and they did." At screenings of the work in progress, Paley had noted a sex split in terms of interpretations of the Ramayana, and because of this she wanted puppets of at least one man and one woman.

The voices are clearly contemporary and somewhat irreverent, unlike their visualisations, which further establishes the theme of contrast between "ancient tragedy and modern comedy"; Chhaya Natak shadow theatre, for example, was commonly used in retellings of the Ramayana.

During these sections, the ideas and contradictions raised over the course of the puppets' discussions are visualized in animated photographic compositions in the background.

=== Musical episodes from the Ramayana ===
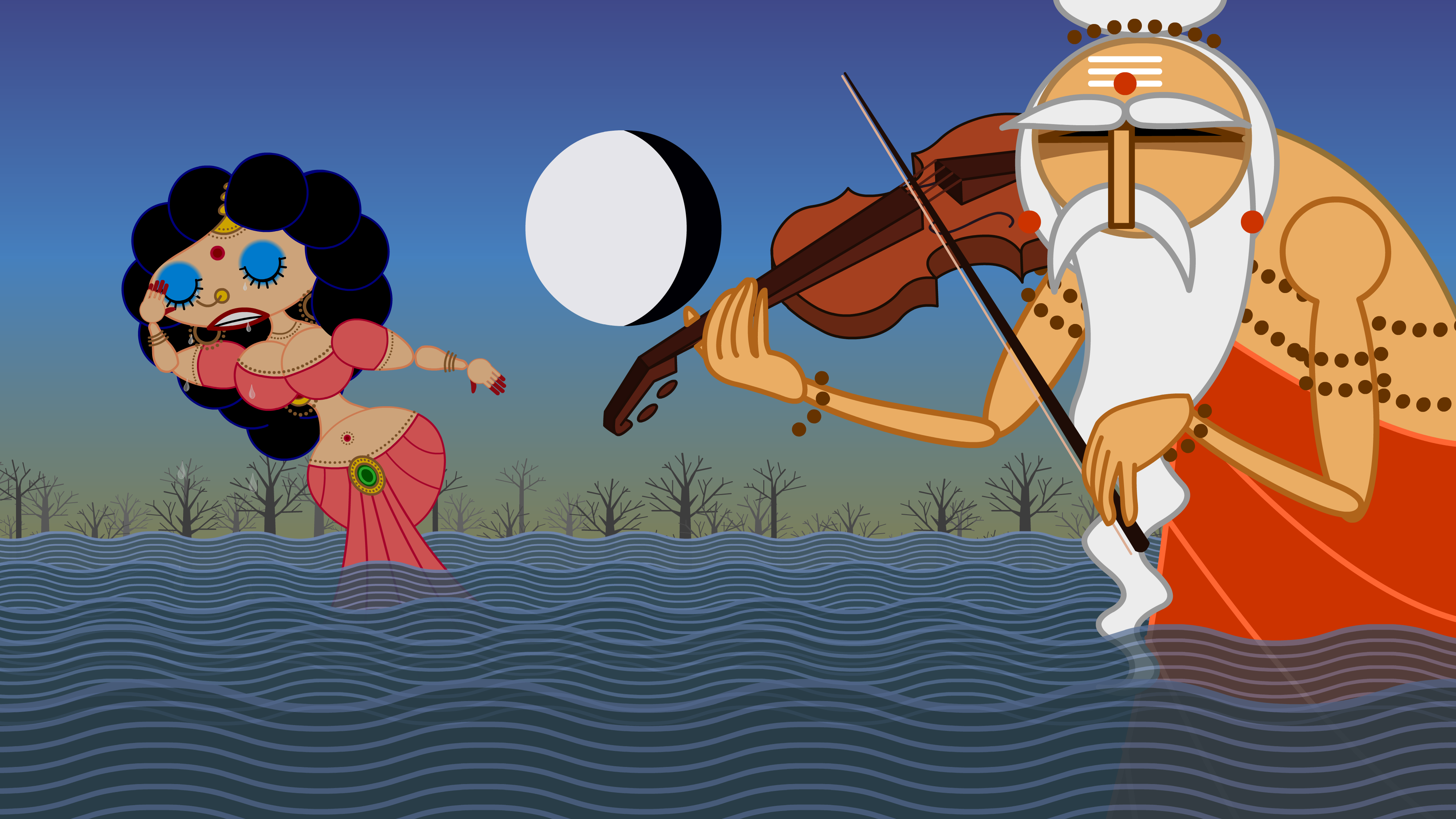
Sita mourns her privation from her husband and his callous behaviour towards her.

Episodes set to certain songs performed by jazz singer Annette Hanshaw are visualized, with Sita as the singing performer, using the strikingly modern technique of vector graphic animation.

The slick, bold style – driven by digital animation software – is at odds with the somewhat rustic quality of the old musical recordings but allows close synchronization with the vocals. The smooth, repetitive, side-scrolling movement affects assists in suspending the musical episode from the more consistent narrative plot.

=== Contemporary parallel ===
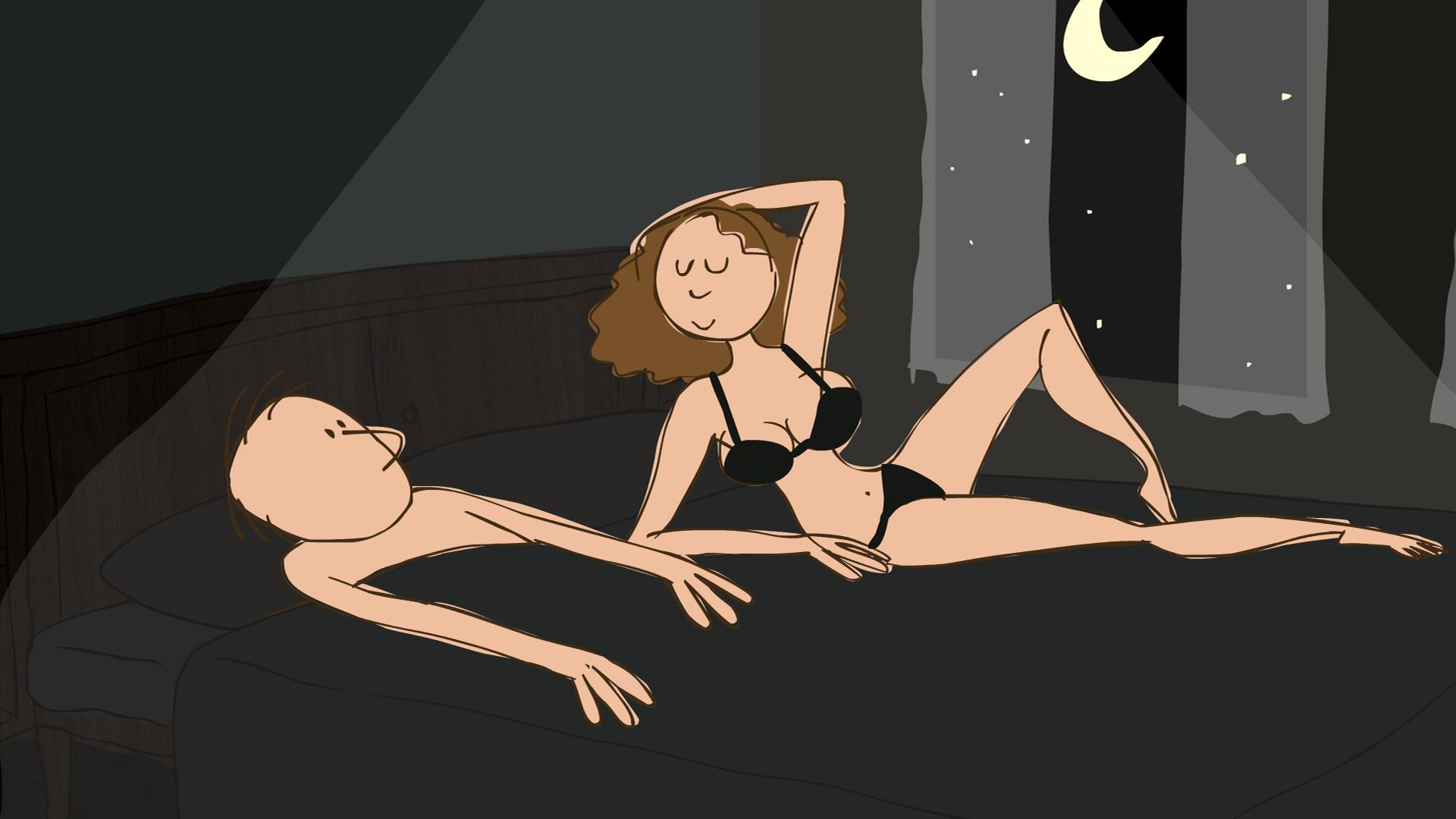
On her arrival in India, Nina's husband seems distant.

The modern, more personal element to the contemporary part of the story is narrated using the rough, energetic Squigglevision technique of traditional animation. It conveys the kind of restlessness inherent in the story and achieves a more light-hearted, universal tone with its simple, highly stylized renderings of character and environments.

== Production ==
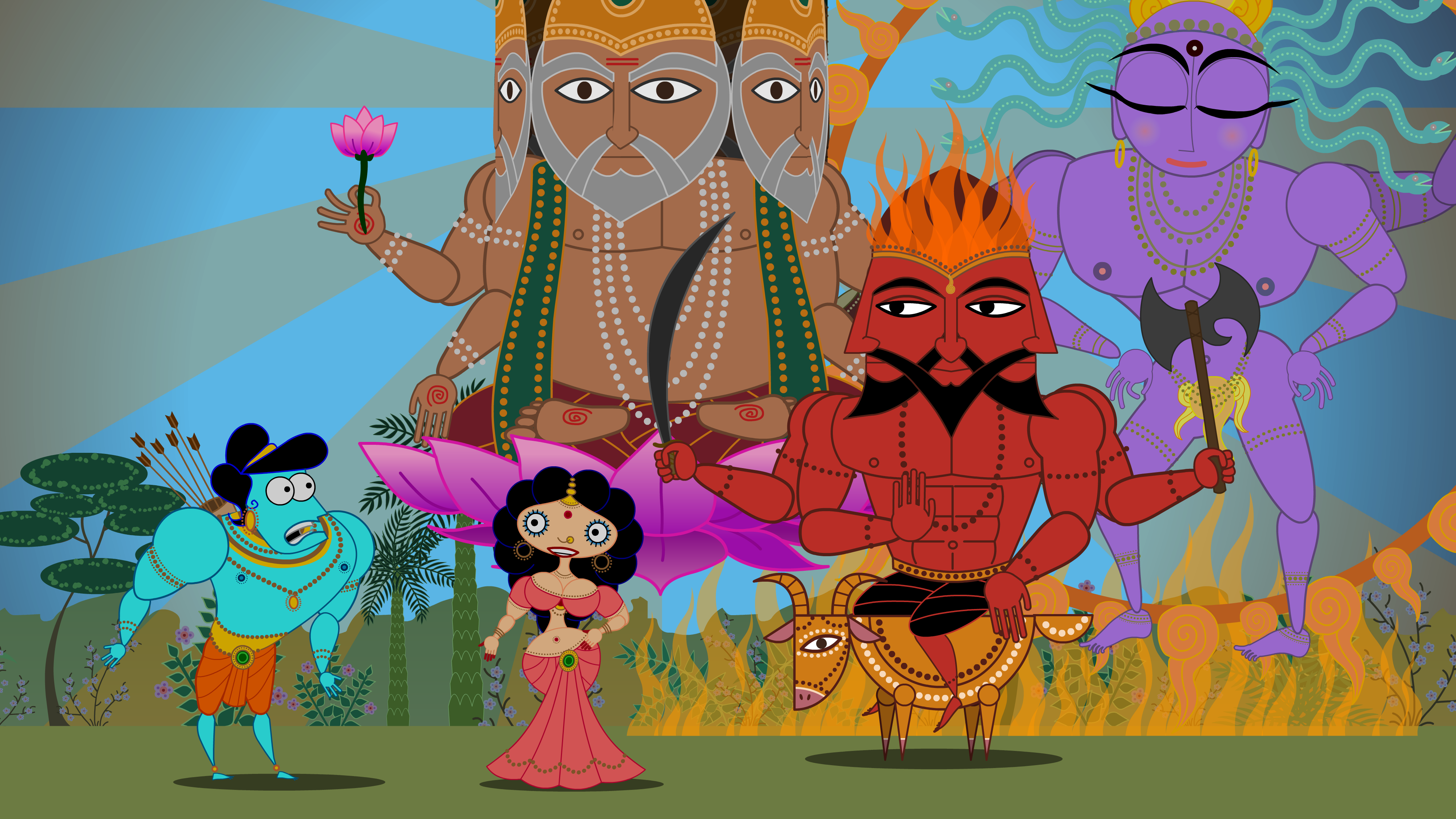
Still image from the feature film Sita Sings the Blues

The production was largely completed by Paley, with support from Jake Friedman in the "Battle of Lanka" scene, primarily using 2D computer graphics and Flash Animation.

In addition to the central numbers recorded by Hanshaw, music was provided by Rohan, Rudresh Mahanthappa, Nik Phelps, Todd Michaelsen and Reena Shah of the duo My Pet Dragon, and by Pierre-Jean Duffour, composer and musician for the band Masaladosa. Shah contributed the voice of the Sita character, in addition to choreographing and performing the dance sequences rotoscoped by Paley for the animation.

Paley estimated her total hours of work to 9,360 and calculated she needed 6,240 people to see the 1.5-hour long film to make an "attention profit".

=== Music ===
A soundtrack album was released digitally in 2009, consisting of original music composed by Todd Michaelsen and the various jazz standards.

No.	Title	Writer(s)	Artist	Length
1.	"Sita in Space (Title Track)"	Michaelsen	Todd Michaelsen	3:13
2.	"Here We Are"	Harry Warren; Gus Kahn	Annette Hanshaw	2:58
3.	"Biryani"	Pierre-Jean Duffour; Brice Duffour	Masaladosa	4:22
4.	"What Wouldn't I Do for That Man"	Jay Gorney; Yip Harburg	Hanshaw	2:49
5.	"Sita Regal"	Michaelsen	Michaelsen	1:35
6.	"Daddy Won't You Please Come Home"	Sam Coslow	Hanshaw	2:59
7.	"Ganpati"	P. Duffour; B. Duffour	Masaladosa	4:32
8.	"Who's That Knockin'"	Seymour Simons; Kahn	Hanshaw	2:50
9.	"Sita Flute"	Michaelsen	Michaelsen	1:41
10.	"Mean to Me"	Fred Ahlert; Roy Turk	Hanshaw	3:16
11.	"Bom Shankar"	P. Duffour; B. Duffour	Masaladosa	3:38
12.	"If You Want the Rainbow"	Oscar Levant; Billy Rose; Mort Dixon	Hanshaw	2:51
13.	"Intermission"	Phelps	Nik Phelps and The Sprocket Ensemble	2:39
14.	"Sita's String Theory"	Michaelsen	Michaelsen	4:00
15.	"Moanin' Low"	Ralph Rainger; Howard Dietz	Hanshaw	3:26
16.	"Agni Pariksha (Sita's Fire)"	Michaelsen; Laxmi Shah	Michaelsen and Reena Shah	2:59
17.	"Am I Blue?"	Grant Clarke; Harry Akst	Hanshaw	3:14
18.	"Rama's Great"	Michaelsen; Nina Paley	Nitya Vidyasagar and Rohan Sukhdeo	1:34
19.	"Lover, Come Back to Me"	Sigmund Romberg; Oscar Hammerstein II	Hanshaw	3:03
20.	"Sita Returns to Mother Earth"	Michaelsen	Michaelsen	1:31
21.	"I've Got a Feeling I'm Falling"	Fats Waller; Harry Link; Rose	Hanshaw	2:54
22.	"Burnt Sugar"	Sukhdeo	Sukhdeo	3:08
23.	"The Song Is Ended"	Irving Berlin	Hanshaw	3:10

=== Copyright problems ===
The film uses a number of 1920s Annette Hanshaw recordings. Although Paley initially made sure these recordings were not covered by US copyright law, a number of other copyright issues surfaced, including state laws prior to US federal copyright law on recordings, rights to the compositions and the right to synchronize the recordings with images. These recordings were protected by state commerce and business laws passed at the time in the absence of applicable federal laws and were never truly "public domain". With the passage of the CLASSICS Act in 2018, all of the Hanshaw recordings in the film are scheduled to enter the public domain by 2030. All of the songs' compositions became public domain by January 1, 2025. (Note: Under United States copyright law, all published musical compositions from 1929 and before entered the public domain following the maximum term allowed, 95 years, on January 1, 2025. Sound recordings follow a different term, and all published sound recordings from the 1920s will enter the public domain by January 1, 2030.)

Without a distributor, Paley was unable to pay the approximately $220,000 that the copyright holders originally demanded. Eventually, a fee of $50,000 was negotiated. Paley took out a loan to license the music in early 2009.

In July 2011, Paley made a protest video regarding the film's deletion from YouTube in Germany due to what she regards as fraudulent take-down notice under the aegis of GEMA, Germany's major music and performance rights organization, but which may be an instance of a larger on-going conflict regarding copyright and royalties between YouTube and GEMA.

On January 18, 2013, Paley announced that she has changed the film's Creative Commons license from "CC-BY-SA" (the Creative Commons Attribution-Share-alike 3.0 Unported license) to "CC-0" (public domain); she made the ownership rights change in response to the continual red tape of rights procurement, even under the share-alike license.

== Distribution ==
Due to terms of the music license, one limited DVD pressing of 4,999 copies was printed. The film was released for free download starting in early March, 2009 "at all resolutions, including broadcast-quality, HD and film-quality image sequences", at the time licensed under "CC BY-SA". The freely downloaded files counted as "promotional copies" and were exempt from payments to the copyright holders of the songs.

Paley plans to make money through voluntary payments, ancillary products, sponsorships, the aforementioned limited DVD sales, and possibly other methods.

A cornerstone of the distribution model is the "creator-endorsed" logo, developed by Paley in cooperation with QuestionCopyright.org. Although anyone is free to distribute the film, distributors who do so while giving a part of the profits to the artist can get the artist's endorsement and use the "creator-endorsed" logo on their promotional materials. Exclusive right to distribute 35mm and HDCam prints of the film is split between GKIDS for all theaters East of the Mississippi River, and Shadow Distribution for all theaters west of the Mississippi River.

The film could also be rented via DVD on Netflix as of March 17, 2010. When asked by a media provider on behalf of Netflix in April 2010 if she would also offer the film via the company's on-demand streaming service in exchange for a limited amount of money, Paley requested that the film be streamed either DRM-free or with an addendum telling viewers where the film was available for download. When the internet television service refused to meet these conditions due to a "No Bumpers" policy, Paley refused to accept their offer, citing her desire to uphold her principled opposition to DRM.

Paley has qualified this distribution strategy as a financial success, citing that it earned $132,000 from March 2009 to March 2010.

== Reception ==
=== Critical response ===
Since its release, Sita Sings the Blues has attracted limited but consistent acclaim from critics. Rotten Tomatoes reports that 100% of critics have given the film a positive review, based on 32 reviews, with an 8.6/10 review average. The site's consensus reads: "A tour de force for filmmaker Nina Paley, Sita Sings the Blues gives the Ramayana its animated due with a visually vibrant, dazzlingly imaginative triumph". The film also holds a score of 93 on the review aggregator website Metacritic based on 11 reviews, indicating "Universal acclaim". It is one of the 12 highest-rated animated films of all time on the site.

Film critic Roger Ebert of the Chicago Sun-Times enthused, "I am enchanted. I am swept away. I am smiling from one end of the film to the other. It is astonishingly original. It brings together four entirely separate elements and combines them into a great whimsical chord... To get any film made is a miracle. To conceive of a film like this is a greater miracle."

The New York Times also praised the film's ingenuity, commenting that "[it] evokes painting, collage, underground comic books, Mumbai musicals and 'Yellow Submarine' (for starters)," and praised Paley for her use of 2D animation: "A Pixar or DreamWorks extravaganza typically concludes with a phone book's worth of technical credits. Ms. Paley did everything in “Sita” — an amazingly eclectic, 82-minute tour de force — by herself."

Although The Hollywood Reporter declared the film to be "a rather rarified effort that will probably appeal more to adults than to children," it described it as "charming" and commented that, "Arriving amidst a tidal wave of overblown and frequently charmless big studio efforts, "Sita Sings the Blues" is a welcome reminder that when it comes to animation bigger isn't necessarily better."

The blog Sepia Mutiny reviewed the film noting that it has "lovely, highly stylized characters" and that Paley stayed "reasonably faithful" to the original story.

=== Controversy ===
The film has drawn controversy from a number of sides. In April 2009, the Hindu Janajagruti Samiti started a petition calling for a complete ban on the movie and initiation of legal action against all those who have been involved in its production and marketing, believing its portrayal of the Ramayana to be offensive, with some members going so far as to call it "a derogatory act against the entire Hindu community."

When the San Jose Museum of Art screened the film, a protester said: "I'm very angry about this film and feel very humiliated by the portrayal of Lord Ram in this very perverted way...negative portrayals of Hinduism cause discrimination and religious intolerance." Another protester at the same event suggested: "Trying to promote India's rich culture in such a way is appalling."

Paley expressed surprise at the adverse reaction, saying "I thought it might be a bit controversial, but I wasn't fully aware of how art and artists are major targets of some right-wing nationalist groups in India. I always imagine an audience of smart, compassionate people I'd enjoy spending time with." However, in an interview with India-West, she did acknowledge that Lord Ram is not depicted well in the film. She added to the source: "No one has to like it."

=== Awards ===
Sita Sings the Blues has won a number of awards.

- Berlinale (Berlin International Film Festival), Feb. 2008, Crystal Bear - Special Mention, Gen-14+, Germany
- Annecy, June 2008, Cristal grand prix for best feature film Archived December 3, 2010, at the Wayback Machine, France
- Avignon, June 2008, Prix Tournage for Best American Feature Film, France
- Athens International Film Festival, Sept. 2008, Best Script Award, Greece
- Ottawa International Animation Festival, Sept. 2008, Honorable Mention for Best Animated Feature, Canada
- Montreal's Festival du nouveau cinéma, Oct. 2008, Grand Prix Z Télé, Grand Prize chosen by the public, Canada
- Expotoons, Oct. 2008, "First Mention" (runner-up), Feature Films, Buenos Aires, Argentina
- Leeds International Film Festival, Nov. 2008, Golden Owl Competition - Special Mention, UK
- Asheville Film Festival, Nov. 2008, Runner-up, Best Feature, Fiction, NC, US
- Starz Denver Film Festival, Nov 2008, Fox 31 Emerging Filmmaker Award, CO, US
- Gotham Independent Film Awards, Dec 2008, Best Film Not Playing at a Theater Near You Archived November 11, 2009, at the Wayback Machine, NYC, NY, US
- Les Nuits Magiques, Dec 2008, Audience Award for Best Feature Film, Begles, France
- Santa Fe Film Festival, Dec 2008, Best Animation, NM, US
- Boulder International Film Festival, Feb 2009, Best Animated Film, CO, US
- Film Independent's Spirit Awards, Feb 2009, Nominee, Acura Someone to Watch Award, Los Angeles, CA, US
- Fargo Film Festival, March 2009, Ruth Landfield Award and Honorable Mention, Best Animation, ND, US
- Festival Monstra, March 2009 Jury's Special Prize, Lisbon, Portugal
- Cairo International Film Festival for Children, March 2009, Jury's Special Mention, Cairo, Egypt
- "Best Animation". tiburonfilmfestival.com. March 2009. Archived from the original on June 12, 2010.
- Big Cartoon Festival, March 2009, Grand Prix Sirin, Krasnoyarsk, Russia
- Animabasaui5, March 2009, Jury Special Award, Bilbao, Spain
- Akron Film Festival, April 2009, Best Feature Film, Akron, OH, US
- Philadelphia CineFest, April 2009, Archie Award for Best First Time Director, Philadelphia, PA, US
- Salem Film Festival, April 2009, Grand Jury Award, Salem, OR, US
- Indian Film Festival of Los Angeles, April 2009, Jury Award for Best Narrative Feature, Los Angeles CA, US
- Talking Pictures Festival, May 2009, Best Animated Film, Evanston, IL, US
- Connecticut Film Festival, June 2009, Best Animated Film, Danbury, CT, US
- Festival Internacional de Cine DerHumALC, June 2009, Signis Award, Best Film of the Official Competition, Buenos Aires, Argentina
- Indianapolis International Film Festival, July 2009, American Spectrum, Best Feature, Indianapolis, IN, US

Paley could not submit the film for consideration for an Academy Award since the film could not be shown commercially, and therefore could not meet the requirement of at least one week long commercial run.

=== Cultural impact ===
In April 2009, the film inspired a Bangkok high fashion line designed by Roj Singhakul, titled "Sita Sings the Blues".

== See also ==
- Versions of Ramayana
- Seder-Masochism (2018), Paley's second animated feature film
