= Nina Paley =

American artist and activist (born 1968)

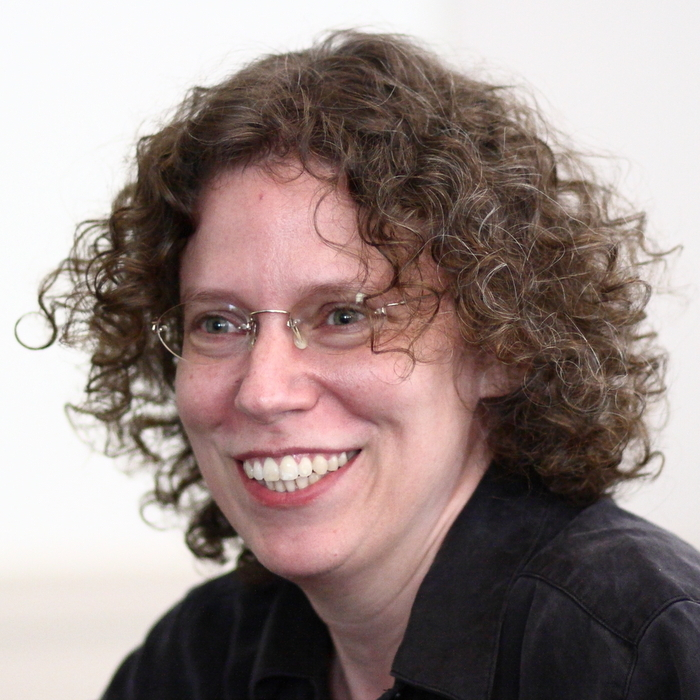
- Paley in 2009
- Born: Nina Carolyn Paley; May 3, 1968 (age 58) Urbana, Illinois, U.S.
- Areas: Writer, cartoonist, animator
- Notable works: Sita Sings the Blues; Seder-Masochism

Nina Carolyn Paley (born May 3, 1968) is an American cartoonist, animator, and free culture activist. She was the artist and often the writer of the comic strips Nina's Adventures and Fluff, after which she worked primarily in animation. She is perhaps best known for creating the 2008 animated feature film Sita Sings the Blues, based on the Ramayana, with parallels to her personal life. In 2018, she completed her second animated feature, Seder-Masochism, a retelling of the Book of Exodus as patriarchy emerging from goddess worship.

Paley distributes much of her work, including Nina’s Adventures, Fluff, and all the original work in Sita Sings The Blues, under a copyleft license.

Since January 2021, Paley runs the gender critical podcast Heterodorx with Corinna Cohn.

== Early life ==
Paley was born in Urbana, Illinois, the daughter of Jean (Passovoy) and Hiram Paley. Her family was Jewish. Her father was a mathematics professor at the University of Illinois and was mayor of Urbana for a term in the early 1970s.

She attended local elementary and high schools, graduating from University High School in 1986. She illustrated a "History of the North Pole" comic in collaboration with University High School history teacher Chris Butler, and attended the University of Illinois, studying art for two years before dropping out. While in college, her comic "Joyride" ran in The Daily Illini newspaper.

== Nina's Adventures and other work ==
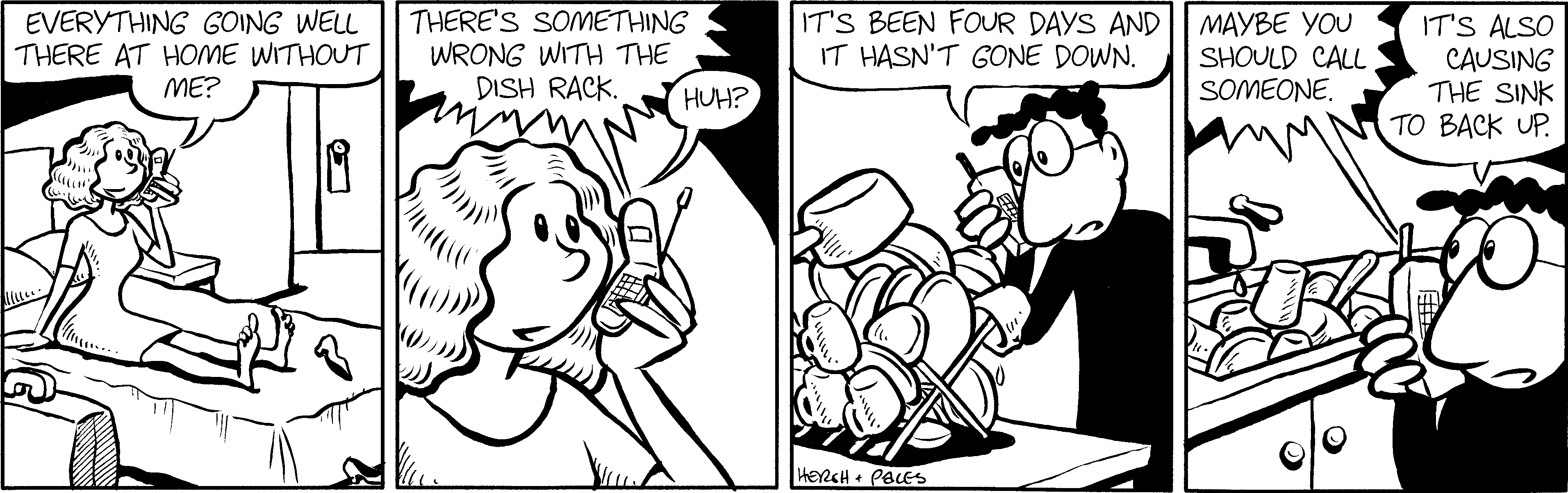
The Hots strip

In 1988, Paley moved to Santa Cruz, California, and began to write and draw the strip Nina's Adventures. In 1991, she illustrated The Santa Cruz Haggadah and moved to San Francisco.

In 2002, she wrote and directed Fetch!, a humorous short cartoon feature based on a variety of optical illusions, which has enjoyed popularity ever since.

Beginning in 2002, Paley focused her work on the controversial subject of population growth. The most notable entry she produced on this subject was The Stork, in which the natural environment is bombed to destruction by storks dropping bundled babies. The film is a compact expression of the conflict between the increasing human population and the ecosystem in which it must live. The 3½ minute film was a considerable success at festivals and resulted in an invitation to the Sundance Film Festival.

During this period of this time, Paley also contributed several comic strips for the Voluntary Human Extinction Movement, of which she is a member and occasional spokesperson. Her work for the group still remains on their official website.

In 2012, Paley posted an animation to Vimeo titled This Land is Mine depicting the Middle East conflicts over history; it was named a Staff Pick.

Between projects, Paley has worked as a freelance director at Duck Studios in Los Angeles. She has also taught in the Design and Technology section of Parsons, part of The New School.

=== Apocalypse Animated ===
An animation depicting the Tree of life in Revelation 22:14, part of the project Apocalypse Animated

In February 2022, Paley completed her project Apocalypse Animated, creating nearly 300 animated loops for the Book of Revelation. Paley also created lenticular cards of 10 selected animations. Paley released Ultra HD (3840 × 2160 pixel) uncompressed Apple ProRes videos of almost 12 minutes of animation under a CC-BY-SA license and encouraged remixing of the material, proposing an audio reading of the Book of Revelation and mixing it with the animation.

== Feature films ==
As of 2018, Paley has created two animated feature films.

=== Sita Sings the Blues ===
In 2002, Paley moved to Trivandrum, India, where her husband had taken a job. While she was visiting New York City on business concerning her third comic strip, The Hots, her husband terminated their marriage. Unable to return to either Trivandrum or San Francisco, she moved to Brooklyn, New York. Her personal crisis caused her to see more deeply into the Ramayana, the Indian epic, which she had encountered in India, and motivated her to produce a short animation which combines an episode from the Ramayana with a torch song recorded in 1929 by Annette Hanshaw, "Mean To Me". Paley later added episodes and other material to the work, which is now called Sita Sings the Blues. Many of the episodes appeared in animation festivals. She expanded it into a feature-length treatment of the Ramayana focused on Rama's wife, Sita, using a variety of animation styles and techniques.

The finished work premiered at the Berlin International Film Festival on February 11, 2008 and had its North American premiere at the Tribeca Film Festival on April 25, 2008. The film was screened at more than 150 film festivals globally and was broadcast on PBS in New York City. For her work on Sita Sings the Blues, Paley was nominated for an Independent Spirit Award and garnered more than 35 international awards, including the top award at Annecy in 2008. The New York Times review of Sita described it as "ambitious and visually loaded" and the film was named a NYT Critic's Pick.

=== Seder-Masochism ===
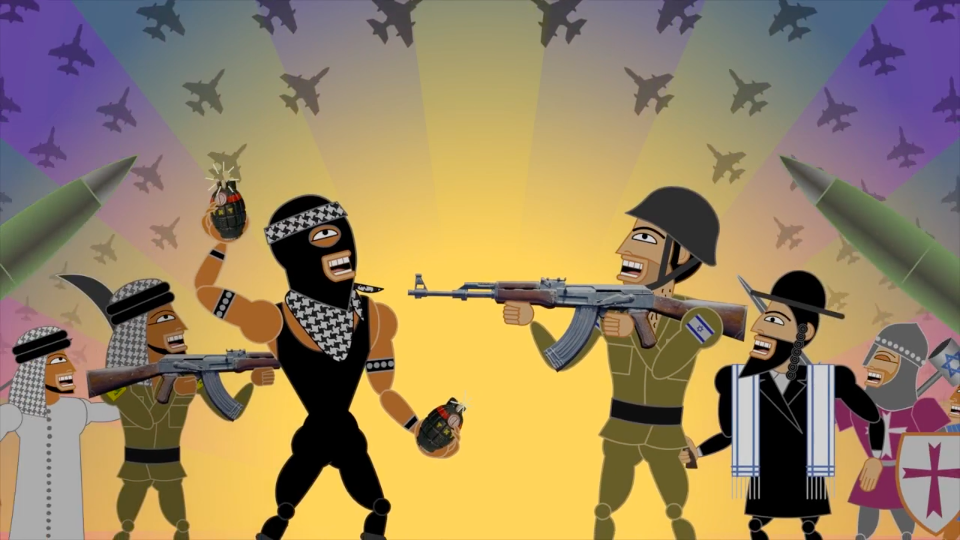
The musical number "This Land is Mine" from Seder-Masochism

In 2011 she began work on a project called Seder-Masochism, an animated film about The Exodus, showing the rise of patriarchy and the fall of goddess worship. In June 2018, after she had worked sporadically on the film for six years, Seder-Masochism premiered at the Annecy International Animated Film Festival in France. Reviewers compared Paley's style to Monty Python, and praised the film's irreverent humor. In Poland, the film was screened at the ANIMATOR film festival where it was chosen by the audience as the festival's best feature-length animated film.

Prior to the theatrical release of the film, Paley uploaded selected scenes for viewing on YouTube and Vimeo. The scene "This Land is Mine" was first posted in 2012, and by 2014 had received 10 million views combined across the two platforms.

== Free culture activism ==
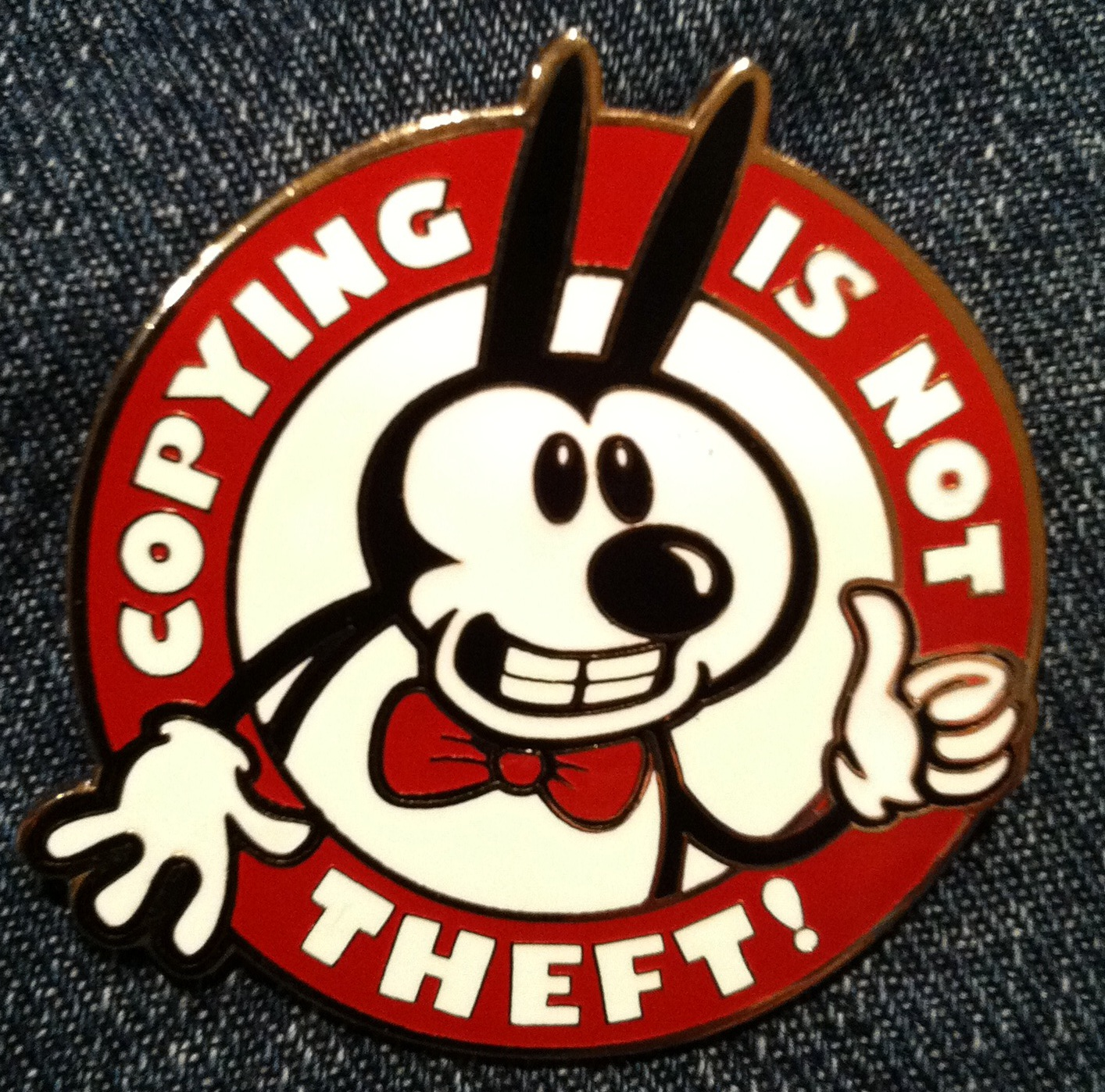
"Copying is not theft!" badge with a character resembling Mimi and Eunice

Because of obstacles in clearing the rights to Hanshaw's recordings for the Sita Sings the Blues, Paley took active part in the free culture movement.

Since 2009 she is an artist-in-residence at the non-profit organization QuestionCopyright.org, which includes running the projects "Minute Memes" and the "Sita Distribution Project". "Minute Memes" is a series of short ("one-minute") video "memes" made by Paley about copyright restrictions and artistic freedom. She wrote and performed the song "Copying Isn't Theft" meant to be freely remixed by other people, with the animated clip issued as Minute Meme #1. Subtitles for the song were created in 10 other languages and performances in Brazilian Portuguese, French, Italian, and Spanish were published.

Subsequent animations in this series are "All Creative Work Is Derivative", EFF Tribute and "Credit is Due: The Attribution Song". She also wrote "Understanding Free Content", an illustrated guide to the idea of free content.

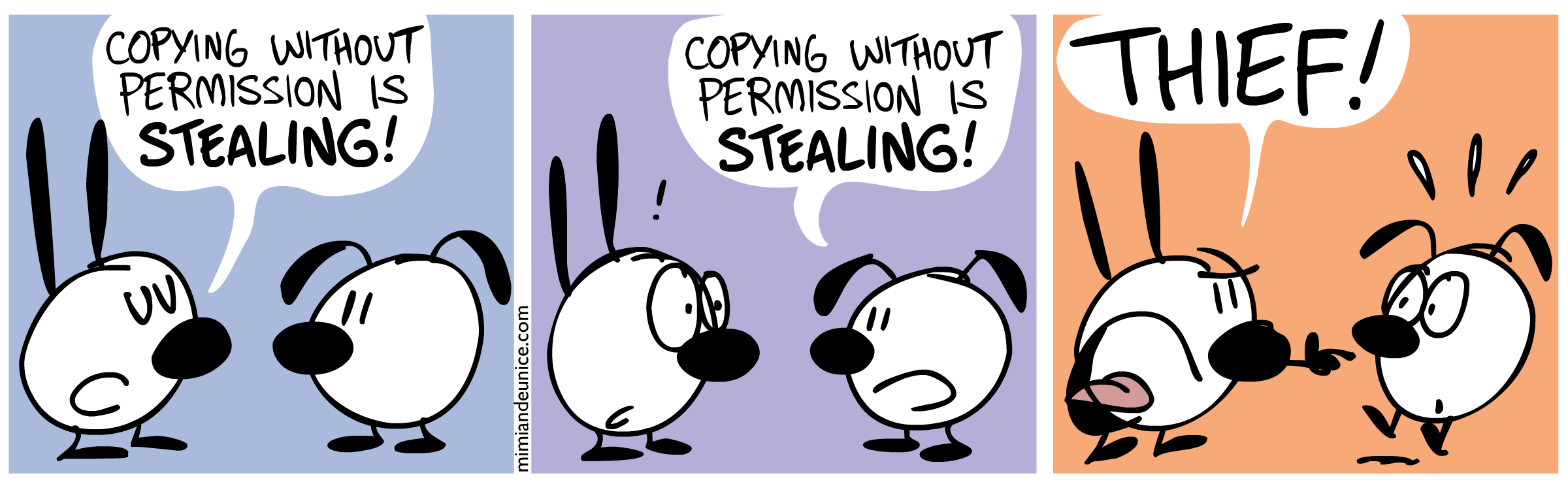
Mimi & Eunice strip no.109 "Thief"

On 9 March 2010, Paley started publishing on her blog a new three-panel comic strip, Mimi & Eunice, highlighting intellectual property problems and paradoxes. The strip has simple graphic style, and features two characters: Mimi (with pointy ears) and Eunice (with floppy ears), who Paley describes as "two middle-aged children/baby psychos/heterosexual lesbians". It is licensed under Creative Commons Attribution-Share Alike. In 2010, a Mimi & Eunice book was released, entitled Misinformation Wants To Be Free, with around 200 full color "Mimi & Eunice" strips.

She has published much of her work, including Nina’s Adventures, Fluff, and all original work in Sita Sings The Blues, under a copyleft licence. The website for Sita Sings the Blues includes a wiki where its fans contributed translated subtitles for the DVD of the film.

Paley won a Public Knowledge IP3 award in 2010 "for her work in intellectual property".

== Views on gender ==
Paley describes herself as gender critical and writes often about the topic on her blog and social media. A showing of Seder-Masochism in 2019 was protested by trans rights activists in Champaign, Illinois due to her online comments. She was a signatory to an open letter published by The Sunday Times defending J. K. Rowling against criticism for transphobia. In an interview with Feminist Current, she stated that when referencing transgender people, she does not necessarily use the pronouns that the person uses. She said, "If a man uses 'she' pronouns... I'm adamant that he is free to identify as he wants. But we're also all free to identify things how we perceive them." Paley is a cohost of the gender critical podcast, Heterodorx.

== Personal life ==
Though of Jewish ancestry, Paley is an atheist as was her father.

In 2011, Paley began making art quilts. The first public exhibition of her quilts was held in June 2013 in central Illinois.

== Works ==
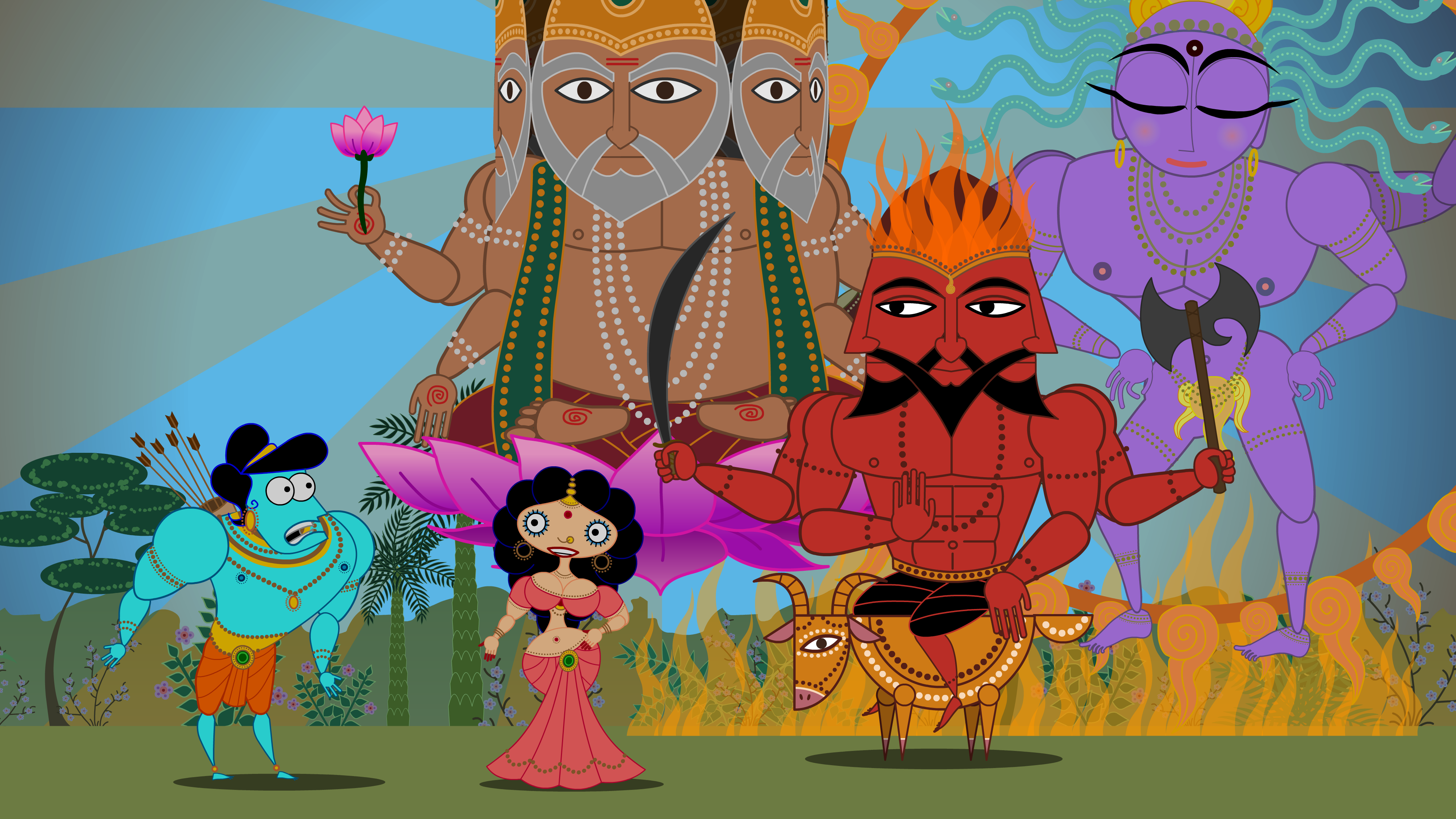
Still image from the feature film Sita Sings the Blues

=== Comics and comic strips ===
- "Casey Jones" for Grateful Dead Comix (1991)
- Nina's Adventures
- Fluff
- The Hots
- Mimi & Eunice

=== Filmography ===
Features

- Sita Sings the Blues (2008)
- Seder-Masochism (2018)

Shorts

- Cancer (1998. Drawing directly on film. 2 minutes. Color. 35mm.)
- Luv Is... (1998. Clay animation. 3.5 minutes. Beta SP / Super-8. Color.)
- I (heart) My Cat (1998. Clay animation. 3 minutes. 16mm. Color.)
- Pandorama (2000. Drawing directly on film. 3 minutes. color. 15perf/70mm - also known as "IMAX")
- Fetch! (2001. 2-D computer animation. 4.5 minutes. 35mm. Color.)
- Thank You for Not Breeding (2002. Documentary. 36 minutes. Video. Color.)
- The Stork (2002. 2-D computer animation (Flash/Photoshop/Final Cut Pro). 3 minutes. Video. Color.)
- Goddess of Fertility (2002. 2-D digital animation. 2 minutes. Clay animated on a glass. Color. 35mm.)
- Fertco (2002. 2-D digital animation. 3 minutes. Color. Video.)
- The Wit and Wisdom of Cancer (2002. 2-D digital animation. 4.5 minutes. Color. Dialog. Video.)
- On Children, a segment in Kahlil Gibran's The Prophet (2015. 2-D digital animation. Color.)

'Copying is Not Theft' by Paley

Music videos

- Connie Champagne - "Copying Is Not Theft" (2009) Animation, lyrics, and tune by Paley.
- Todd Michaelsen "All Creative Work Is Derivative" (2010) Using Michaelsen's "Sita's String Theory" and Paley's animations.
- Evanescent - "Credit Is Due (The Attribution Song)" (2011) Animation, lyrics, and tune by Paley.
- Intuitive Gym - Her Story. Using Paley's animations.
- Gala - "Parallel Lines" (2021) Animation by Paley.
- Milton Estes and His Musical Millers - "When the Fire Comes Down" (2022) Animation from Apocalypse Animated

=== Other works ===
- Quilts
- "Apocalypse Animated" and lenticular cards of its animations.
- "Agents of H.A.G." Comic Book
- GENDER WARS Cards
- "Hundred Dollar Drawings", with instructions limited to two words or less.
- MysticSymbolic

=== Media appearances and talks ===
- The Tom and Doug Show - Paley has been a regular guest on the nationally syndicated Tom and Doug radio show, a weekly comedy music show on the Pacifica Radio Network. She "showed" her film The Wit and Wisdom of Cancer on show 304, discussed her "Christmas Resistance movement" on show 336, discussed Tom and Doug's songs "Gangsta Knitter" and "Sooner or Later" on show 232, discussed Sita Sings the Blues on show 361, and Tom and Doug rewrote her song "Copying is Not Theft" and played it for her on show 377.
- Talk "Copyright is Brain Damage" at TEDxMaastricht
