= Tom and Doug =

- Origin: Buffalo, New York, United States
- Genres: Comedy, jazz, rock, satire, ragtime, blues, heavy metal, polka, folk, country, calypso, hip hop, reggae, punk rock, Holiday, tribute, bossa nova, classical, children's, traditional, show tunes, new age, Cajun, samba, house
- Years active: 1985–present
- Members: Thomas P. Florek (Vocals, keyboard, piano, accordion, bass); Doug Gentile (Vocals, guitar, bass)
- Past members: Also known as "third Tom and Dougs"; Joe Bezek (drums, guitar, saxophone, vocals); Eric Schopf (piano, vocals); Will Stone (drums); Doug Gardner (drums); Dan Grise (guitar)
- Website: tomanddoug.com

Tom and Doug are a comedy music duo, performing in multiple musical styles including jazz, rock, ragtime, blues, comedy, folk, rap, polka, heavy metal, and country. They are often compared to Flight of the Conchords and They Might Be Giants. Thomas P. Florek and Douglas Gentile have been writing, performing, and recording together since 1985. From 2005 through 2010 they hosted a biweekly podcast that features their music and that of other artists. In 2010, they began a weekly half-hour radio show streaming on KHOI-FM. In 2011, they began offering their show over the national Pacifica Radio Network.

== Career ==
From 1985-1986, Tom and Doug formed the band, Norm and the Standard Deviates, along with Eric Schopf (piano, vocals), Dave Meyer (lead guitar, backing vocals), and Steve Rehn (rhythm guitar). Meyer went on to form a Celtic band called Kindred, with his wife.

In 1985, Tom was part of an active group of artists who founded Squeaky Wheel Buffalo Media Arts Center, a grassroots organization to promote video, computer and digital arts.

In 1986 Tom and Doug wrote and recorded the song "God Doesn't Want Your Money." A video for the song was developed through support from Hallwalls Contemporary Art Center in Buffalo, NY, and it became an immediate hit among the Public-access television cable TV channel for Buffalo, and was heavily broadcast for several years. "God Doesn't Want Your Money" is a work of country music which exposes the confusion between our culture's simultaneous dedication toward the icons of "God" and "Money", while remaining generally supportive of both.

Doug moved to Princeton, New Jersey in the fall of 1986 to work for Educational Testing Service. Tom joined him in 1987. They performed and recorded regularly as a duo and with other artists from 1987-1988. They joined a hard rock band known as Czar in 1988, which changed its name to Gunshy upon their joining. Gunshy were: Doug (bass, vocals), Tom (keyboards, vocals), Paul Burns (lead guitar, vocals), Rock Vitella (drums, vocals), Bill Durie (guitar, vocals). Doug had met Bill Durie when they both performed in Jesus Christ Superstar at the Bucks County Playhouse, in New Hope, PA.

Tom and Doug became regular performers at various Central New Jersey venues, including GoodTime Charley's in Kingston, NJ (where Tom performed more than 150 times).

Before Doug moved to Champaign, IL, Tom and Doug released their album Last Tango In Princeton. In September 1988, Tom and Doug made their first "live via satellite" audio performance with Doug performing live from his new home in Champaign, and Tom on-stage at GoodTime Charley's in Kingston, NJ. It is still unknown how they performed this technical feat, playing live in two states. During this time, they also recorded their second album, A Toast to Champaign, released in 1989.

One year later, Doug moved to St. Paul, MN. On October 30, 1989, Tom and Doug made their first "live via satellite" video performance where Doug joined Tom on stage, with Doug appearing on televisions that had been set up throughout the night club.

Doug joined the variety dance band, Shane Lea, in 1991. The Shane Lea band lineup was: Doug (bass, vocals), Stoney (rhythm guitar, vocals), Bob (drums, vocals), and Dan Grise (lead guitar, vocals. Doug left the band in 1993. The band broke up in 1995. Grise joined the band, Tamarak, in 1997.

Tom recorded and pressed a vinyl LP, titled Subliminal Farms, by Beth Bacon and Thomas P (with Doug also appearing on one song). Doug recorded radio advertising for the album when it was released. The album still receives radio airplay.

In January 1998, Tom launched the "Cafe Improv" television show in Princeton, NJ. This monthly program is recorded at the "Paul Robeson Center for the Arts" and still appears on Princeton Community Television. Doug has appeared with Tom several times over the years.

Tom also released a solo album, New World Odor, in 1992, on which Doug appears in a couple songs. It includes the first song they wrote together, "God Doesn't Want Your Money."

Tom and Doug continue to write and record music, for use on their own albums and for other projects. They create music for documentary videos that Tom produces annually for the Anchor House Ride for Runaways, along with Joe Bezek. The 2007 video received the "Best Music in a Short Documentary" award at the Garden State Film Festival. They also have created several music videos that have been shown at prestigious film festivals, including the Aspen Shortsfest, the Toronto ReelHeART International Film Festival, and others.

In 2005, they began to write and produce a bi-weekly podcast that they featured on their website. The format was typically that they would discuss and play two of the songs from their catalog. The shows varied in length from about 12 minutes to 25 minutes. They continued this until 2010, when they switched formats to a weekly half-hour show. The reformatted show was created for KHOI-FM, a community radio station in Ames, IA. The half hour format includes more music and additional material such as semi-regular commentary by Doug's grandparents or fake commercials.

In 2011, the weekly Tom and Doug Show began to be offered to the national Pacifica Radio Network. It has been aired on WAZU in Peoria, IL, WRFA-LP in Jamestown, NY, KHOI in Ames, IA, and is also available for free subscription over iTunes. They have had some surprising guests on their radio show, including the cartoonist Nina Paley (who "showed" one of her films on the program), inventor Andrea Rossi (who discussed his energy catalyzer and whether Doug could beat him at tennis), and Professor Peter Schickele (who discussed the music of P.D.Q. Bach, and its similarities to the music of Tom and Doug).

== Independent projects ==
Tom hosts a performance and television show, Cafe Improv, in Princeton, NJ.

Since 1988, Tom has also hosted an annual holiday show, titled "Santa P. and the Elves." This show has had many different musicians over the years and two regular artists who perform at it every year (Doug and Joe Bezek, who plays as a session musician with several bands). Santa P. and the Elves have released two CDs of their odd Christmas music to mixed reviews.

== Appearances, awards, and other publicity ==
On March 19, 1990, Tom and Doug performed at the "New Variety" concert series in Trenton, NJ. Sharing the bill with Tom and Doug were Eugene Chadbourne, and Elliott Sharp. The event was hosted by soon-to-be famous Gene Ween of the group Ween.

On January 28, 1992 Tom opened for American folk singer Bill Morrissey, at Good Time Charley's in Kingston, NJ. On this same night Tom released his solo album New World Odor, featuring many songs written and performed outside of his collaboration with Doug.

In June 1999, Dee Snider launched his radio show on WMRQ-Hartford, CT. Dee chose Tom and Doug's unique jazz rendition of the "We're Not Gonna Take It" to be his theme song, and this recording was played on every show until its end in August 2003. On December 17, 1999, Tom and Doug traveled to Hartford to appear live on the "Dee Snider Radio" program. They were interviewed twice, and performed 2 songs, including their holiday rap song "Jingle Bell Rap". Joining Tom and Doug's band were drummers Lou Mang, Matt Valle, and guitarist Ralph Angelotti. Also appearing on this program were Adam Sandler, and Ike Turner.

The "Gangsta Knitter" video received world-wide attention after appearing in Vogueknitting's Knit.1 premiere issue. "Gangsta Knitter" was featured at the 2005 Century City Film Festival, and 2007 Garden State Film Festival.

Tom and Doug's video, "These Guys Know What Love Is," played at the Aspen Shortsfest in April 2009, opening for Wallace and Gromit's A Matter of Loaf and Death. It was also shown at the NJ International Film Festival, HDFest NYC in 2008, and received an award at the Bucks Fever Film Festival in 2008.

"Gangsta Knitter," "These Guys Know What Love Is," and "Compelling" were presented at the ReelHeART International Film Festival in Toronto

Tom and Doug were guests on the Breezin' with Bierman Show, where they performed "Macho Man."

== Discography ==
1988 Last Tango in Princeton (cassette tape)
1989 Doug, Doug, Kevin, & Tom: A Toast to Champaign (cassette tape)
1990 Beth Bacon & Thomas P: Subliminal Farms (LP)
1992 New World Odor (cassette tape and CD)
1993 Doug and Tom Sell You a Load of Trash (cassette tape)
1994 The Adventures of Tom and Doug (cassette tape)
1995 Santa P. & the Elves (CD)
1998 Santa P. & the Elves: Dude Looks Like a Lady (CD)
2004 Tom & Doug: Volume 1 - Outstanding in Their Field - The 19th Anniversary Album (CD)
2007 Tom & Doug: Volume 2 - Love Songs - These Guys Know What Love Is (CD)
2008 Tom & Doug: Volume 3.0 - Slightly Twisted Children's Songs (CD)
2014 Never Mind the Bollocks, It's Time for Tom & Doug (CD, Music Download)
2024 "Crowd Pleasers" (CD, streaming)
