= Masaladosa =

French electronic band

MASALADOSA
- Origin: France
- Genres: Electronic music, Indian music
- Years active: 2002–present
- Members: Pierre-Jean Duffour
- Website: www.masaladosamusic.com

Masaladosa is a French electronic band formed in 2002. The band consists of members Pierre-Jean Duffour, Brice Duffour. Masaladosa composed music for the film Sita Sings the Blues. The band has collaborated with other artists, including Anoushka Shankar and Manu Dibango. The name of the band is originally taken from Indian (especially South Indian) famous dish Masala Dosa.

== Discography ==
- Baraka (EP, 2002)
- Chill Aum (2004)
- Electro World Curry (2008)
- Boombay (Single, 2021)
- Small World Big Masala (2024)
