= Rishab Prasanna =

Indian flute or bansuri player

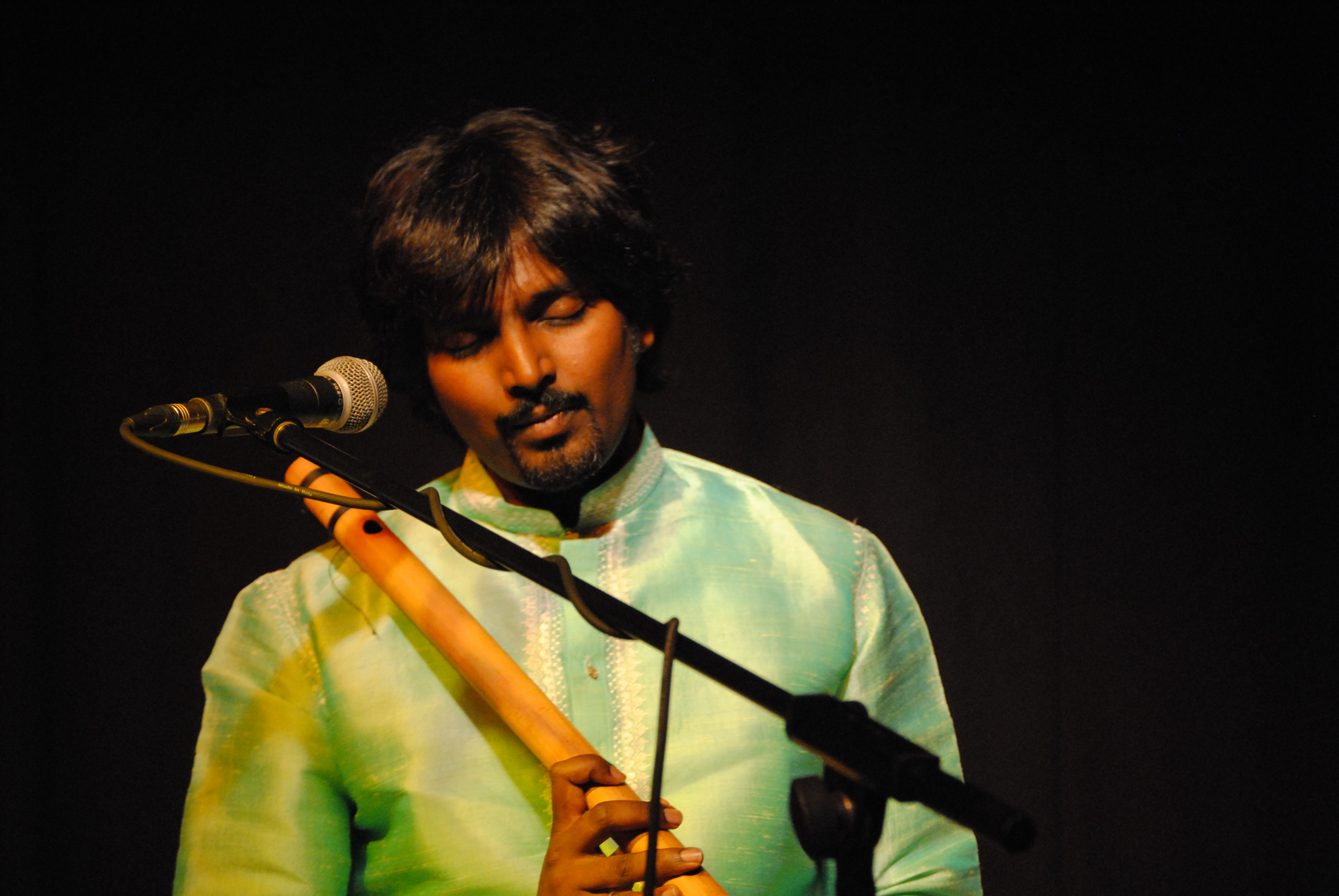
- Rishab Prasanna playing in Paris

Background information
- Born: New Delhi, India
- Genre: Hindustani classical
- Occupation: Flute player
- Instrument: Bansuri

Rishab Prasanna (Hindi: ऋषभ प्रसन्ना, Urdu: رشبھ پرسنا) is an Indian bansuri player and composer. He was born in New Delhi. He is son of flute and shehnai player Rajendra Prasanna.

== Career ==
Rishab has performed at:

- Salle Pierre Boulez, Philharmonie de Paris, France.
- Sydney Opera House, Sydney, Australia.
- WOMAD Festivals in Australia and New Zealand.
- Festival d'Avignon, France.
- Elbphilharmonie, Hamburg, Germany.
- Palau de la Música de València, Valencia, Spain.
- Darbar Festival, London, United Kingdom.
- Festival Messiaen, France.
- Festival international de la musique andalou, Algeria.
- Les Allées Chantent, Isère, France.
- Musique et Patrimoine, Chinon, France.
- Nancy Jazz Pulsations, France
- Doverlane Festival, Kolkata
- Printemps des Arts, Moncao

== Title ==
- Rishab has been awarded as the cultural ambassador of Toulouse City, France
- A recipient of YUVA Sangeet Natak Academy Award in 2021.

== Film work ==
Rishab Prasanna performed flute for the French comedy film Le Sens de la fête (2017), directed by Éric Toledano and Olivier Nakache. He has also contributed to the soundtrack of the award-winning film Monsieur (2018), directed by Rohena Gera.

== Theatre ==
- 2013 – Rangmanch Festival, National School of Drama (NSD), India.
- 2019–2020 – Penthésilée, Théâtre de Sartrouville et des Yvelines– CDN, France.
- 2022 – Festival d’Avignon, France.

== Masterclasses and workshops ==
- Mahatma Gandhi Institute, Mauritius.
- DROM Association, Brittany, France.
- Haute École de Musique, Geneva, Switzerland.
- Chaville Conservatory, France. "Rishab Prasanna official website".
- Conservatoire National Supérieur de Musique et de Danse de Lyon (CNSMD Lyon), France. "Masterclass musique indienne avec Rishab Prasanna".
- Pôle Sup'93, France. "Masterclass musique indienne avec Rishab Prasanna".
