= Kate Douglas =

Kate Douglas may refer to:

- Kate Douglas, fictional character in The Big Green
- Kate Douglas, fictional character in Without a Trace played by Tamara Braun
- Lady Kate Douglas, daughter of David Douglas, 12th Marquess of Queensberry
- Kate Douglas (cousin of James I), cousin and protector of James I of Scotland

== See also ==
- Katherine Douglas (disambiguation)
- Katie Douglas (disambiguation)
- Kate Douglas Wiggin (1856–1923), American educator, author and composer, wrote the novel Rebecca of Sunnybrook Farm
