= Giorgio Mainerio =

Italian composer

Giorgio Mainerio (c. 1530s – 3 or 4 May 1582) was an Italian musician, composer, and occultist. He started his career as a presbyter and would only later start his musical career in the 1560s. Most of the songs he composed were in the 1570s and were mainly church music. He dabbled in occultism and was later investigated for it. Before his death, he suffered from health issues.

== Biography ==
Mainerio was born in Parma, Italy between 1530 and 1540. His father is thought to have been Scottish given that Giorgio signed Mayner as his family name. During his education, he studied music, but he did not immediately begin a musical career. In 1560, being a presbyter, he sought work as a chaplain and altarista by the church of Santa Maria Annunziata in Udine.

In Udine, Mainerio spent ten years (from 1560 to 1570) and there, thanks to his previous musical knowledge and to the lessons given to him by two local contrapuntists, Gabriele Martinengo (Maestro di cappella from 1562 to 1567) and Ippolito Chamaterò (Maestro di cappella from 1567 to 1570), he started his musical career. After three years in Udine he became interested in occultism (astrology, magic and necromancy) and there were rumours that—together with some women—he was attending night-rites. The Inquisition in Aquileia started a preliminary investigation, but the case was closed for lack of evidence. After the investigation, Mainiero had more troubles with his colleagues in the Chapter of Udine and, after applying for a position at the Patriarchal Basilica of Aquileia, he quit the job in Udine partially, motivating his decision with "impelling although honest reasons". He was accepted at Aquileia and moved there, living in the quiet and isolated Patriarchate.

In 1578, he became Maestro di cappella at the church of S. Chiesa d'Aquilegia. During the last years of his life, he had problems with his health and often left the church in favour of travels to Venice, Ancona, and thermal baths. His death was announced to the Chapter on 4 May 1582.

== Works ==
Schiarazula Marazula
from Il primo libro de' balli, MIDI file by Ulrich Metzner

Mainerio mainly wrote works of Musica Sacra, although he published a collection of popular songs and dances, such as Il primo libro de' balli.

Magnificat octo tonorum...cum quatuor vocibus containing a Regina coeli was published by Mainerio and printed in Venice by G. Bariletto in 1574.

Il primo libro de balli accomodati per cantar et sonar d'ogni sorte de instromenti di Giorgio Mainerio Parmeggiano Maestro di Capella della S. Chiesa d'Aquilegia was printed by Gardano in Venice in 1578.

Later, he published another ten Magnificats collected under the title of Sacra cantica Beatissimae M. Virg. omnitonum sex vocum parium canenda, integrated by a motet (also six-part) named O sacrum convivium: they were all printed in Venice in 1580 by Angelo Gardano.

== Popular culture ==
Mainerio's Schiarazula Marazula appears in 1977 both as Carlos Saura’s film Elisa, vida mia ’s openning credits and adapted as "Ballo in Fa diesis minore" on Angelo Branduardi's album La pulce d'acqua (English edition as Fables and Fantasies, 1980).

Mainerio's character appears in a story of the popular Italian comics book/horror Dampyr, issued monthly by Sergio Bonelli Editore. The story, entitled Il musicista stregato ("The Bewitched Musician") and published in #107 of the regular series in February 2009, was written by Mauro Boselli on a plot by Mario Faggella and drawn by Mario Rossi (Majo). It reinterprets real aspects of Mainerio's life (particularly his interest in occultism and magic) in a fantastic tone, combining them with some myths of Friulan folklore such as agane, female water demons similar to Scottish bean nighes.
