= Si può fare =

Si può fare may refer to:

- Si può fare (album)
- Si può fare (film)
