= Katie Douglas =

Katie or Katy Douglas may refer to:

- Katie Douglas (basketball), retired American professional basketball player
- Katie Douglas (actress) (born 1998), Canadian actress
- Katy Douglas (cousin of James I), cousin and protector of James I of Scotland

== See also ==
- Kate Douglas (disambiguation)
- Katherine Douglas (disambiguation)
- Kitty Douglas, Duchess of Queensberry
