= Catherine Douglas (disambiguation) =

Catherine Douglas was a historical figure who tried to prevent the assassination of King James I of Scotland.

Catherine Douglas may also refer to:

- Catherine Douglas, Baroness Glenbervie (1760–1817)
- Catherine Douglas, Duchess of Queensberry (1701–1777), English socialite
- Catherine Zeta-Jones (born 1969), wife of Michael Douglas
- Kathy Douglas, American model
- Katherine Douglas Smith (1878–?), militant British suffragette
- Katherine Douglas (rower), 2020 British Olympian
- Katharine Waldo Douglas (1870–1939), American novelist and translator

== See also ==
- Kate Douglas (disambiguation)
- Katie Douglas (disambiguation)
