= Cercando l'oro =

Studio album by Angelo Branduardi
- Released: 1983
- Recorded: 1982–1983
- Studio: Studio Quattro 1
- Genre: Folk
- Label: Polydor

Angelo Branduardi chronology
Branduardi '81 (1981)	Cercando l'oro (1983)	State buoni se potete (1983)

Cercando l'oro is an album of the Italian singer-songwriter Angelo Branduardi. It was released in 1983 by Polydor; in the same year a French version was also released, entitled Tout l'or du monde.

As usual for Branduardi, the lyrics were written in collaboration with his wife, Luisa Zappa. The song "Piano piano" is an Italian version of the popular English song "Barbara Allen".

== Track listing ==
- All music by Angelo Branduardi. Lyrics by Luisa and Angelo Branduardi.
1. "Il libro" 4:23
2. "La giostra" 4:30
3. "L'acrobata" 3:13
4. "Piano piano" 4:29
5. "Natale" 3:30
6. "Cercando l'oro" 4:33
7. "L'isola" 4:50
8. "Profumo d'arancio" 3:16
9. "La volpe" 4:15
10. "Ora che il giorno è finito" 4:01
