= La pulce d'acqua =

Studio album by Angelo Branduardi
- Released: 1977
- Studio: Fonit-Cetra Studios
- Genres: Folk, Italian singer-songwriters
- Label: Polydor

Angelo Branduardi chronology
Alla fiera dell'est (1976)	La pulce d'acqua (1977)	Cogli la prima mela (1979)

La pulce d'acqua ("The Water Flea") is an album by Italian singer-songwriter Angelo Branduardi. It was released in 1977 by Polydor. A French edition, entitled La Demoiselle, was released in 1979; an English edition, entitled Fables and Fantasies and with lyrics written by Peter Sinfield, was released in 1980.

The title track, "La pulce d'acqua" is based on a Native American legend reported and adapted by Jaime de Angulo about a man falling ill because his shadow has been stolen by a water flea. "Ballo in Fa diesis minore" ("Dance in F-sharp minor") is based on Ingmar Bergman's The Seventh Seal in which a man defies the personification of Death (lyrics are taken from an inscription of a danse macabre depiction at Clusone, near Bergamo); the melody is inspired by "Schiarazula Marazula", a medieval northern Italian theme which accompanied exorcism rites and which was collected by Giorgio Mainerio in his Primo libro de' balli (1578). "Il ciliegio" ("The cherry tree") is based on the English traditional song "The Cherry Tree Carol". "Il poeta di corte" ("The court poet"), featuring launeddas parts by Luigi Lai, is partially based on "Canarios" by Aragonese Baroque composer Gaspar Sanz.

"La lepre nella luna" ("The hare in the Moon") is inspired by a Buddhist legend of the Moon rabbit. "La bella dama senza pietà" ("The beautiful merciless dame") recalls a poem by John Keats, in turn based on a composition by Alain Chartier. "La sposa rubata" ("The stolen bride"), finally, retakes a Breton song entitled "Ar plac'h dimezet gant Satan" ("Satan's fiancée"), included in the Barzaz Breiz anthology.

== Track listing ==
- Lyrics by Luisa and Angelo Branduardi. Music by Angelo Branduardi. Copyright Luna Music S.A.S.
1. "Ballo in Fa diesis minore" – 7:02
2. "Il ciliegio" – 4:15
3. "Nascita di un lago" – 4:12
4. "Il poeta di corte" – 3:49
5. "Il marinaio" – 4:07
6. "La pulce d'acqua" – 4:44
7. "La sposa rubata" – 4:01
8. "La lepre nella luna" – 5:02
9. "La bella dama senza pietà" – 6:40
