= Cogli la prima mela =

1979 album by Angelo Branduardi

Studio album by Angelo Branduardi
- Released: 1979
- Genre: Folk
- Label: Polydor
- Producer: Dory Zard; David Zard; Angelo Branduardi

Angelo Branduardi chronology
| La pulce d'acqua (1977) | Cogli la prima mela (1979) | Concerto (1980) |

Cogli la prima mela ("Pick the first apple") is an album by Italian singer-songwriter Angelo Branduardi. It was released in 1979 by Polydor.

The title track is a re-imagining of a medieval Hungarian melody, entitled "U našeho Bárty" ("At our Bárty's"). Also the music of "Donna ti voglio cantare" ("Woman, I want to sing about you") is based on a medieval melody by Pierre Attaingnant, entitled "Tourdion", which Branduardi himself recorded for his later album Futuro antico II.

The lyrics to "La raccolta" ("The harvest") are taken from a poem by Sappho, while the music is from the Romanian folk ballad "M-am suit în dealul Clujului" ("I climbed the hill of Cluj"). Finally, the song "Ninna nanna" ("Lullaby") is the Italian version of "Mary Hamilton", an English traditional song also recorded by Joan Baez.

== Track listing ==
1. "Cogli la prima mela" (3:25)
2. "Se tu sei cielo" (3:10)
3. "La strega" (4:18)
4. "Donna ti voglio cantare" (3:25)
5. "La raccolta" (4:51)
6. "Colori" (3:30)
7. "Il signore di Baux" (4:29)
8. "Il gufo e il pavone" (3:10)
9. "Ninna nanna" (7:23)

== Charts ==
=== Weekly charts ===
| Chart (1980) | Peak position |
|---|---|
| German Albums (Offizielle Top 100) | 12 |

=== Year-end charts ===
| Chart (1980) | Position |
|---|---|
| German Albums (Offizielle Top 100) | 51 |

== Certifications and sales ==
| Region | Certification | Certified units/sales |
|---|---|---|
| Italy | — | 1,000,000 |
