= Angelo Branduardi =

Italian singer and songwriter (born 1950)

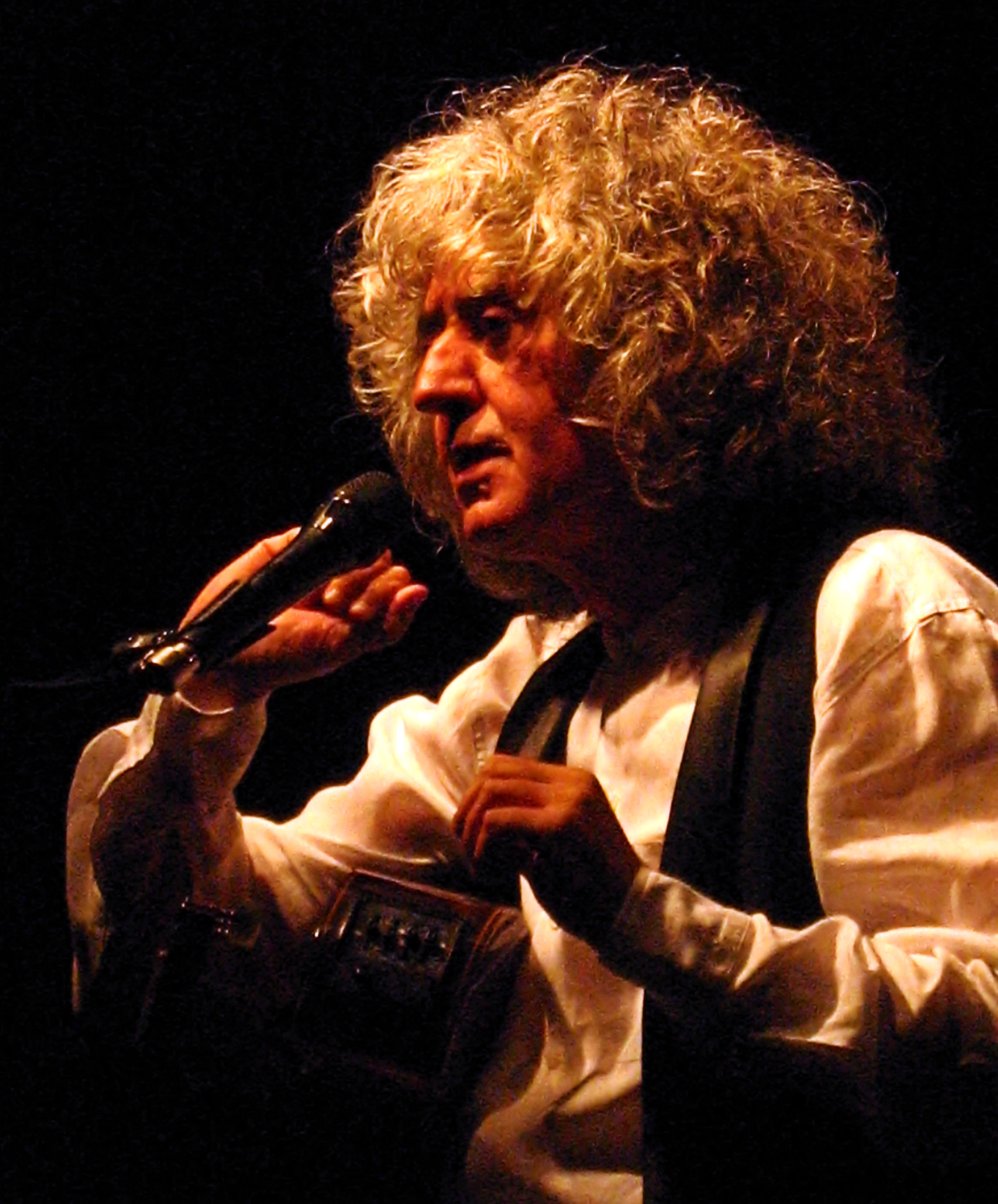
- Branduardi in 2008
- Born: 12 February 1950 (age 75); Cuggiono, Lombardy, Italy
- Years active: 1974–present

Angelo Branduardi (born 12 February 1950) is an Italian folk/folk rock singer-songwriter and composer who scored relative success in Italy and European countries such as France, Germany, Belgium, Netherlands and Greece.

== Early and personal life ==
Branduardi was born in Cuggiono, a small town in the province of Milan, but early moved with the family to Genoa. He was educated as a classical violinist at the Genoa Conservatory. At the age of 18, he composed the music for the Confessioni di un malandrino (Hooligan's Confession) by Sergei Yesenin.

He is married to Luisa Zappa, who wrote the lyrics for many of his songs. They have two daughters, Sarah and Maddalena, both musicians.

== Career ==
=== Beginnings ===
Branduardi's first album was never released, and resulted from a co-operation with Maurizio Fabrizio, composer and gifted performer. The first released album, Angelo Branduardi '74 was arranged with Paul Buckmaster.

=== The minstrel ===
La Luna ("The Moon"), including "Hooligan's Confession" (translation of a poem by Esenin) and the fine, delicate song giving the LP its name, was a prelude to the success of the following works. Alla fiera dell'Est (English edition: Highdown Fair, 1976) was Branduardi's first vastly popular album, followed by La Pulce d'Acqua (English version, Fables and Fantasies 1978) and Cogli la prima mela (English edition, Life is the Only Teacher, 1979). Lyrics for the English versions of Branduardi's albums were written by Peter Sinfield, also lyricist for King Crimson and Emerson, Lake & Palmer.

In those albums, Branduardi exploited themes and patterns from early music, mostly Renaissance and early Baroque. The song "Alla fiera dell'Est" ("At the Eastern Fair") is still popular among Italians of every age, who test themselves committing to memory all the fable-like, repetitive lyrics. It is based on an old Jewish song in Aramaic ("Chad Gadya" – One Kid Goat) sung at the end of the Passover Seder night service. In 2007 "Alla fiera dell'Est" was covered by Israeli singer Shlomi Shabat for a Passover time commercial for cellphone company Pelephone.

Lyrics had a broad spectrum of inspiration: a Danse macabre, the theme of Satan's mistress, Chinese, Native American and Druidic tradition, the apocryphal Gospels. Concertation owes much to the talents of Maurizio Fabrizio, and exploits unusual instruments for pop music: dulcimer, Pan flute, lute, clarinet, among others – mixed with more standard guitar, bass and drums.

=== Experimentation and crisis ===
Subsequent albums showed an increasing desire towards experimentation and differentiation. Branduardi (1981) had a more intimate tone, Cercando l'oro ("Searching for Gold", 1983) had very sophisticated and delicate arrangements (starts with a String Quartet), Branduardi canta Yeats ("Branduardi sings Yeats", 1985) was a tribute to William Butler Yeats. Pane e rose ("Bread and Roses", 1988) was a still inspired, but increasingly dark picture of life and death. Il Ladro ("The Thief", 1991) marked a very delicate point of Branduardi's life, edging on depression, echoed in a dark, almost cemeterial, style of singing.

The album Si può fare ("It Can Be Done", 1993) brought back Branduardi to normality, but the artist is now struggling to evade the minstrel character which was now too tight for him. In 1994, he published Domenica e lunedì ("Sunday and Monday"), dedicated to the Italian poet Franco Fortini who was one of Branduardi's professors in his school years.

=== New directions ===
In 1996, during the celebrations for the restoration of the Duomo of Spilimbergo after the catastrophic 1976 earthquake, he recorded the album Futuro antico ("Ancient Future"), in which he, as an early Baroque musician, keeps reusing, mixing, wording pre-existing material along with his own. This experience, accomplished with the aid of musicians and musicologists, continued with Futuro antico II and Futuro antico III. The same year he performed "Te vojo 'bbene assaje" ("I love you so much" in Neapolitan) with Italian pop singer Eugenio Finardi.

In 1998, Branduardi teamed up with Italian stand-up comedian and writer Giorgio Faletti for Il dito e la luna ("The Finger and the Moon").

He subsequently reworked earlier musical themes with writings of and about St. Francis to produce L'infinitamente piccolo ("The Infinitely Small"); he wrote a musical on the same topic (Francesco).

In 2003, a new album, Altro ed altrove ("Other and Elsewhere"), in a time period marked by a rise of racism and intolerance, brought together (mainly) love stories from several cultures.

For the last 10 years, his band, on stage, has been composed of Davide Raggazoni (drums), Michele Ascolese (guitars), Leonardo Pieri (keyboards) and Stefano Olivato (bass and harmonica), or with Ellade Bandini (drums) and Maurizio Fabrizio (guitars and keyboards).

== Discography ==
- Angelo Branduardi (1974)
- La luna (1975 – French edition: Confession d'un malandrin, 1981)
- Alla fiera dell'est (1976, Italian Music Critics's Award – French edition: A la foire de l'est – English edition: Highdown Fair, 1978)
- La pulce d'acqua (1977 'La demoiselle" – French Edition: English edition: Fables and fantasies, 1980)
- Cogli la prima mela (1979)
- Va ou le vent te mene with Maurizio Fabrizio (1980)
- Gulliver, la luna e altri disegni (1980)
- Concerto (1980, live collection, 3LP, released on 2CD in 1992)
- Branduardi '81 (1981)
- Cercando l'oro (1983 – French edition: Tout l'or du monde)
- State buoni se potete (1983, soundtrack for the movie with the same name)
- Momo (1986, soundtrack for the movie with the same name)
- Branduardi canta Yeats (1986)
- Poets in New York (Poetas en Nueva York) (contributor, Federico García Lorca tribute album, 1986)
- Pane e rose (1988 – French edition: Du pain et des roses)
- Secondo Ponzio Pilato (1988)
- Il ladro (1990)
- Musiche da film (1992)
- Si può fare (1992 – French edition: Ça se fait)
- Domenica e lunedì (1994 – French edition: La menace, 1995)
- Camminando camminando (1996, live collection)
- Futuro antico I (1996)
- Il dito e la luna (1998, lyrics by Giorgio Faletti)
- Studio Collection (Branduardi)|Studio Collection (1998, collection)
- Futuro antico II (1999)
- L'infinitamente piccolo (2000)
- Futuro antico III (2002)
- Altro ed altrove (2003)
- The Platinum Collection (Angelo Branduardi album)|The Platinum Collection (2005, collection)
- Futuro antico IV (2007)
- Senza Spina (2009)
- Futuro antico VI (2009)
- Futuro antico VII (2010)
- Così è se mi pare (2011)
- Il rovo e la rosa - ballate d'amore e morte (2013)
- Futuro antico VIII (2014)
- Da Francesco a Francesco (2016)
