= Eleanor Fortescue-Brickdale =

British artist (1872–1945)

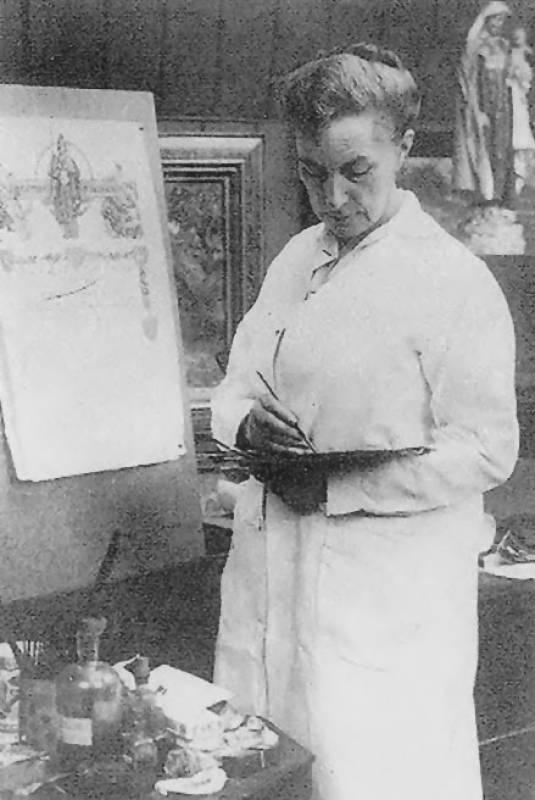
- Fortescue-Brickdale in about 1900
- Born: 25 January 1872; Upper Norwood, Surrey, England
- Died: 10 March 1945 (aged 73)
- Education: Crystal Palace School of Art; Royal Academy Schools
- Known for: painting; illustration; designs for stained glass

Eleanor Fortescue-Brickdale (25 January 1872 – 10 March 1945) was a British artist, a late exponent of Pre-Raphaelitism. She produced paintings in oils and watercolour, book illustrations, and a number of designs for works in stained glass.

== Life ==
Mary Eleanor Fortescue Brickdale, daughter of Matthew and Sarah Fortescue Brickdale, was born 25 January 1872 at her parents' house, Birchamp Villa in Upper Norwood, Surrey. Her father was a barrister. She was trained first at the Crystal Palace School of Art, under Herbert Bone, and entered the Royal Academy Schools in 1896. In that year she also exhibited a work at the Royal Academy, and won a prize for a design for a lunette, Spring, for the dining-room of the academy. Her first major painting was The Pale Complexion of True Love (1899). She soon began exhibiting her oil paintings at the Royal Academy, and her watercolours at the Dowdeswell Gallery, where she had several solo exhibitions.

While at the academy, Fortescue-Brickdale came under the influence of John Byam Liston Shaw, a protégé of John Everett Millais much influenced by John William Waterhouse. When Byam Shaw founded his art school in 1910, Fortescue-Brickdale became a teacher there.

In 1909, Ernest Brown, of the Leicester Galleries, commissioned a series of twenty-eight watercolour illustrations to Tennyson's Idylls of the King, which Fortescue-Brickdale painted over two years. They were exhibited at the gallery in 1911, and twenty-four of them were published the following year in a deluxe edition of the first four Idylls.

She also made designs for stained glass windows for churches and religious institutions, of which two were published in The Studio in 1900; her earliest surviving window dates from 1912. The actual stained-glass work was done by an associate, Harry Grylls. Many of these designs were for memorials, particularly in the aftermath of the First World War.

She lived during much of her career in Holland Park Road, opposite Leighton House, where she held an exhibition in 1904.

Fortescue-Brickdale was an associate member of the Royal Society of Painters in Water Colours from 1901, and was elected to full membership in 1919; she was elected to the Royal Institute of Oil Painters in 1902, its earliest female member. She exhibited at the first exhibition of the Society of Graphic Art in 1921. Her 1921 World War I memorial to the King's Own Yorkshire Light Infantry is in York Minster.

She was a staunch Christian, and donated works to churches. Amongst her best known works are The Uninvited Guest and Guinevere. She died on 10 March 1945, and is buried at Brompton Cemetery, London.

== Books illustrated ==
- Poems by Tennyson, 1905
- Pippa Passes by Robert Browning, 1908
- Men and Women by Browning, 1908
- Dramatis Personae by Browning, 1909
- Dramatic Romances and Lyrics by Browning, 1909
- Idylls of the King by Tennyson, 1911
- Story of St Elizabeth of Hungary by William Canton, 1912
- Book of Old English Songs and Ballads, 1915
- Eleanor Fortescue Brickdale's Golden Book of Famous Women, 1919
- The Sweet and Touching Tale of Fleure and Blanchfleure, 1922
- Carols, 1925
- Golden Treasury of Songs and Lyrics published by Palgrave, 1925
- A Diary of an Eighteenth Century Garden, Calthorp, 1926.

== Works ==
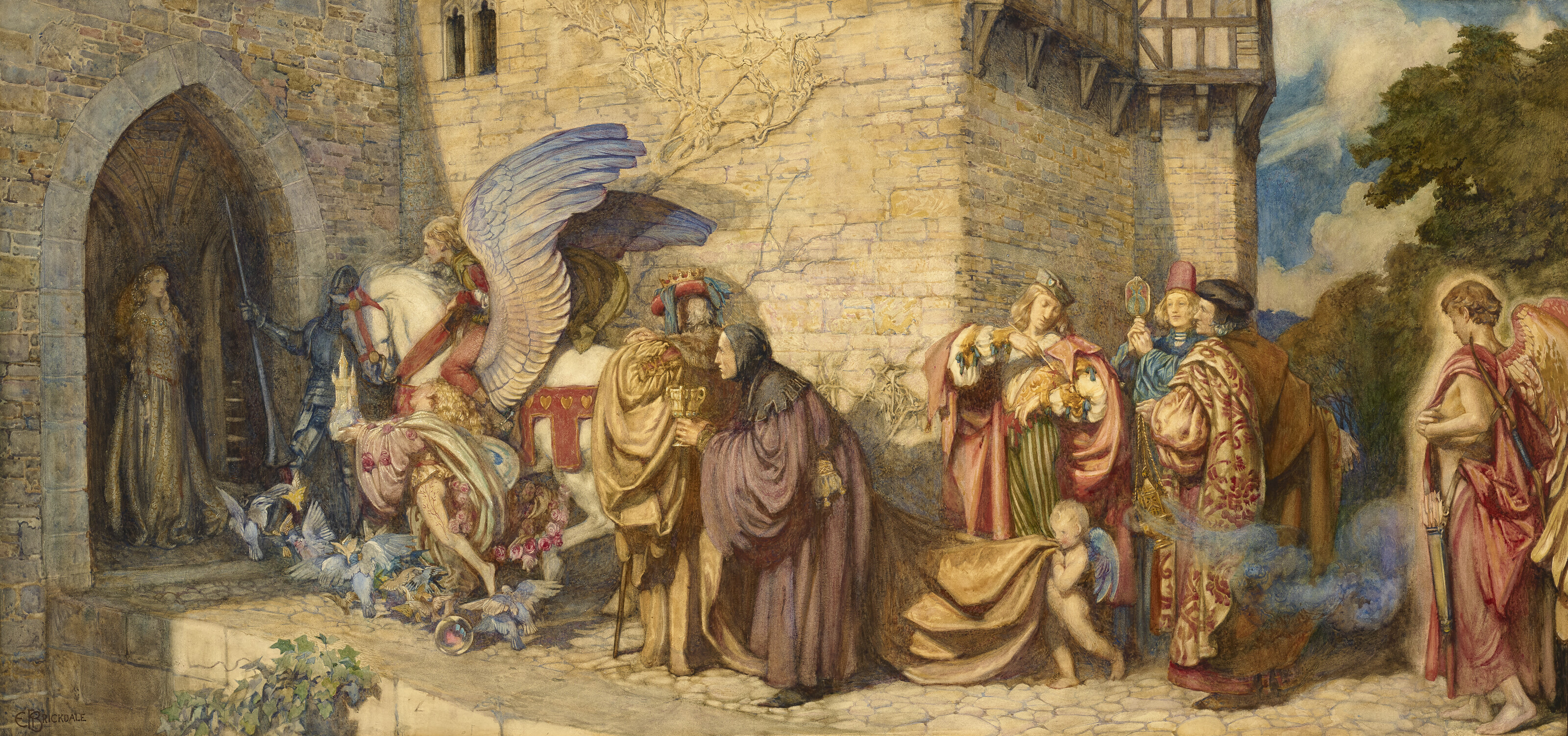
Love and his Counterfeits, 1904

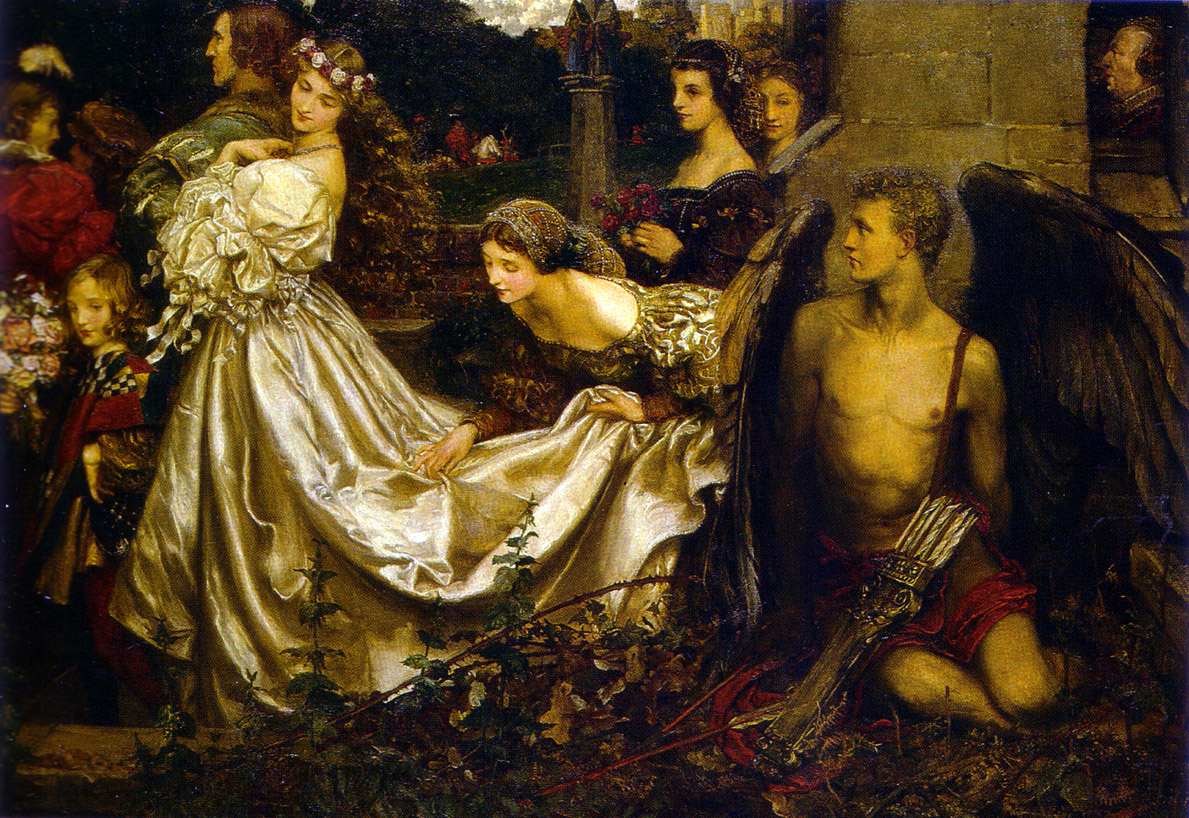
The Uninvited Guest, 1906

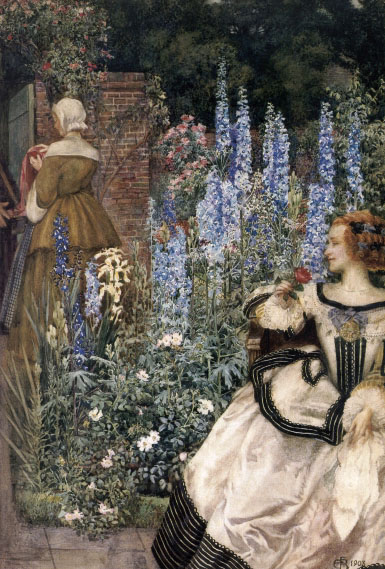
They toil not, neither do they spin

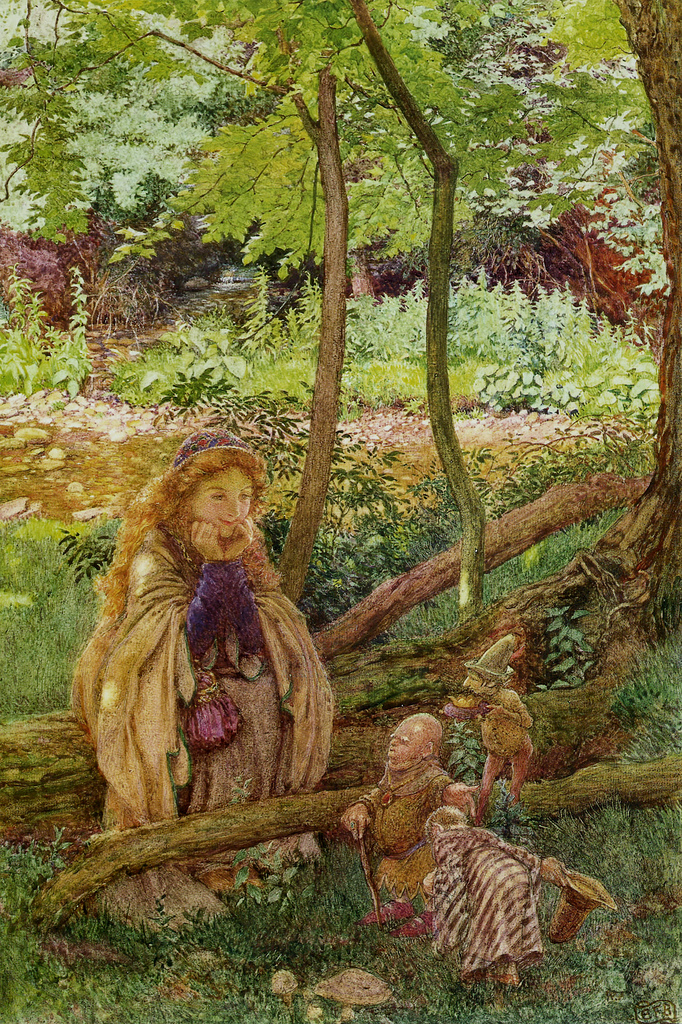
The introduction

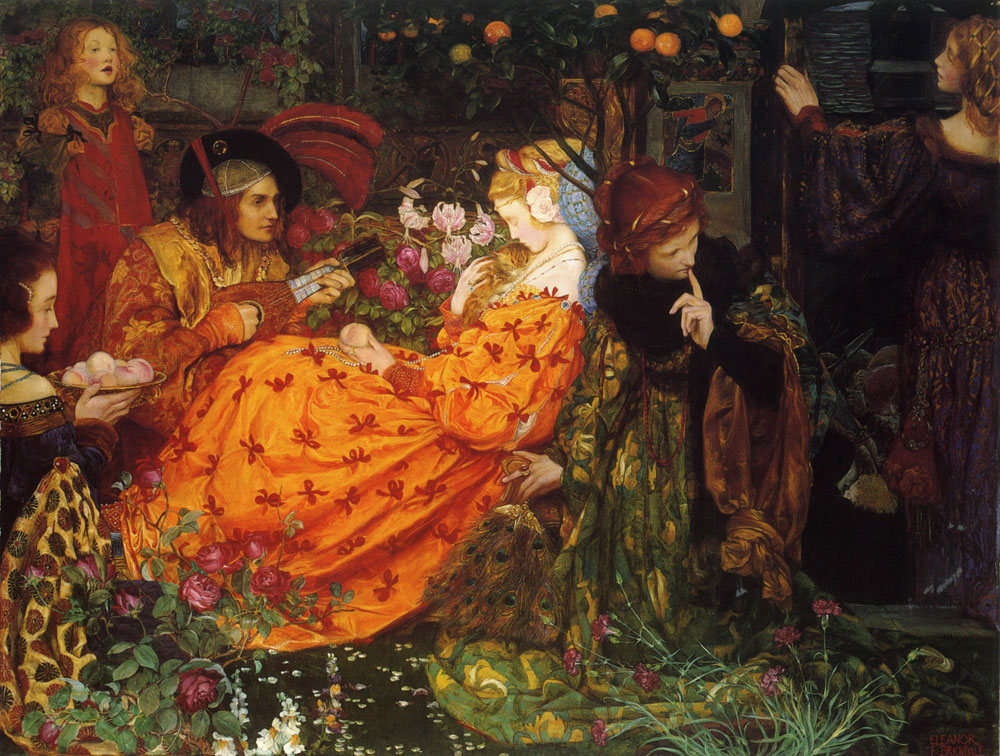
Riches

=== Golden book of famous women (1919) ===
This accompanied some 50 literary extracts from a variety of sources with 16 illustrations reproducing watercolours by Fortescue-Brickdale showing female characters, real and fictional.

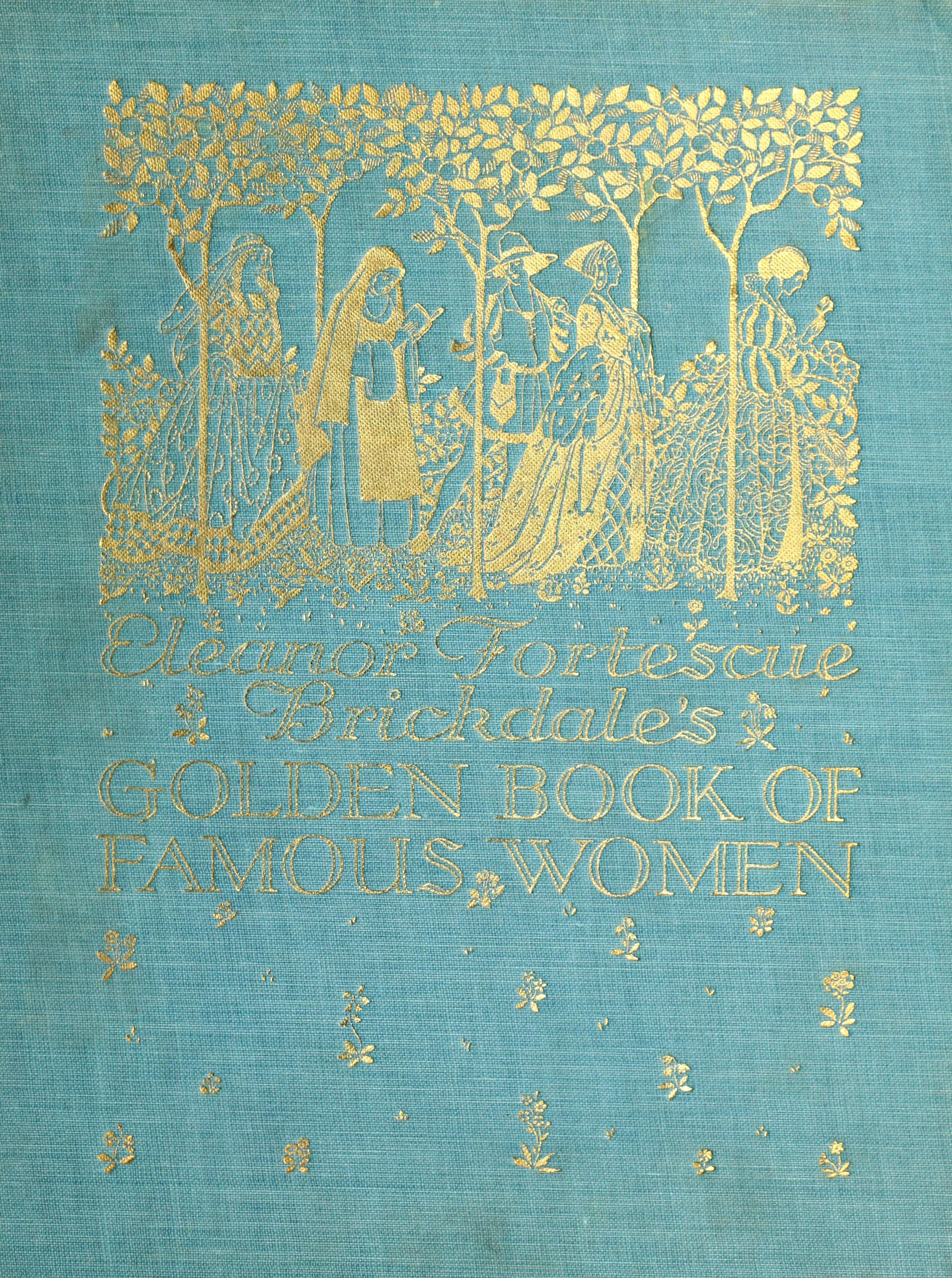

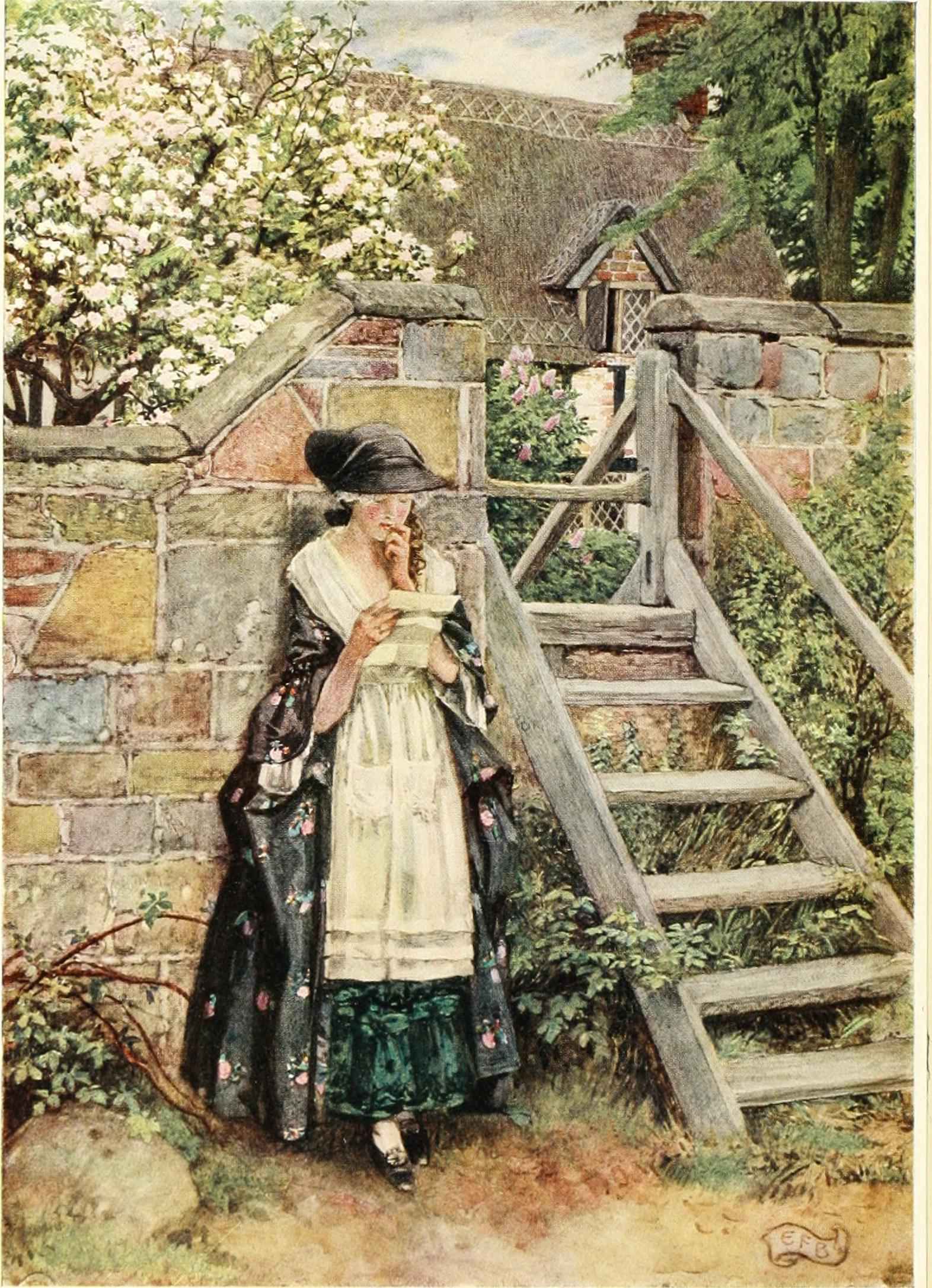
Olivia, from The Vicar of Wakefield (Oliver Goldsmith)

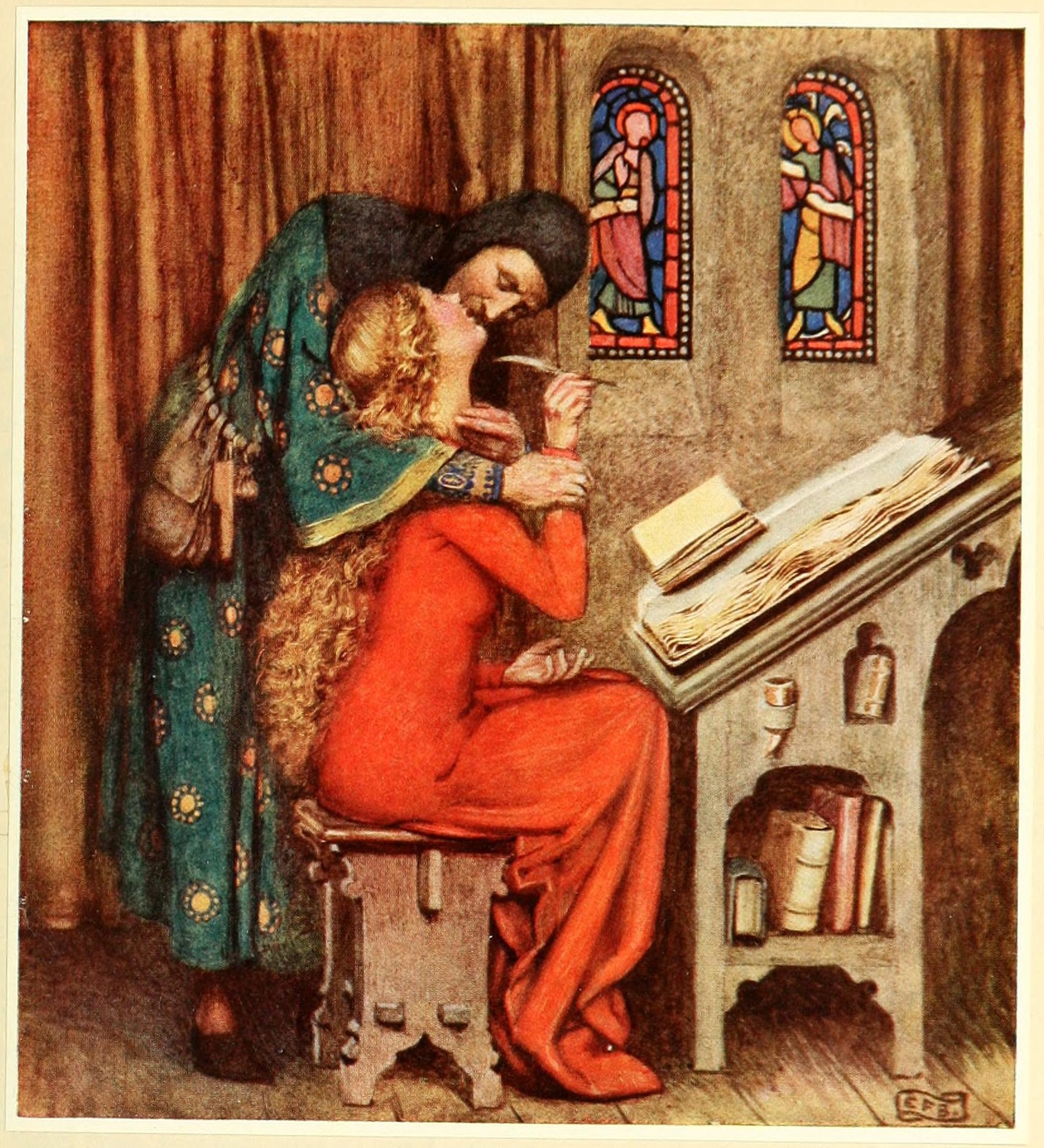
Héloïse and Abelard

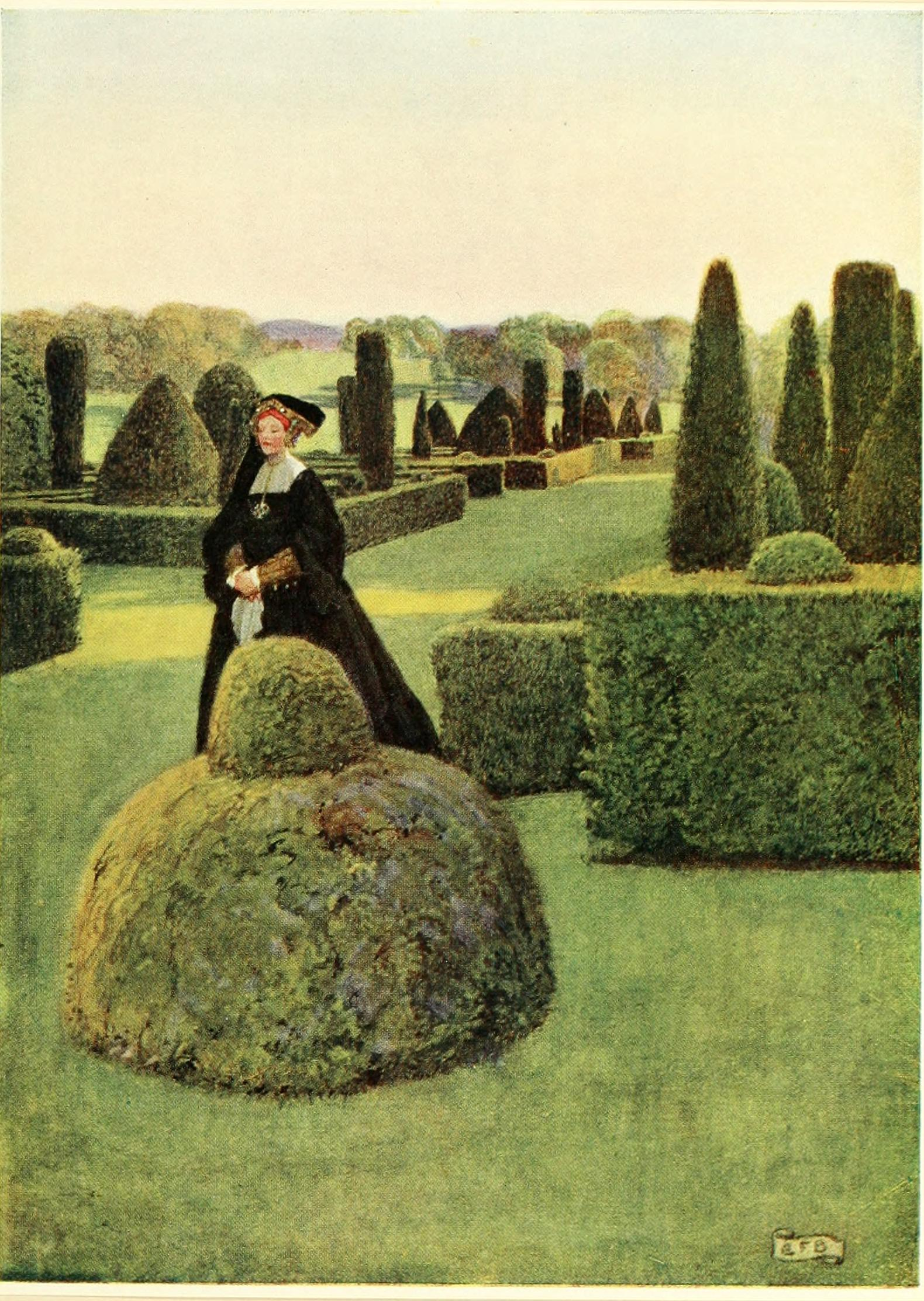
Fair Rosamund

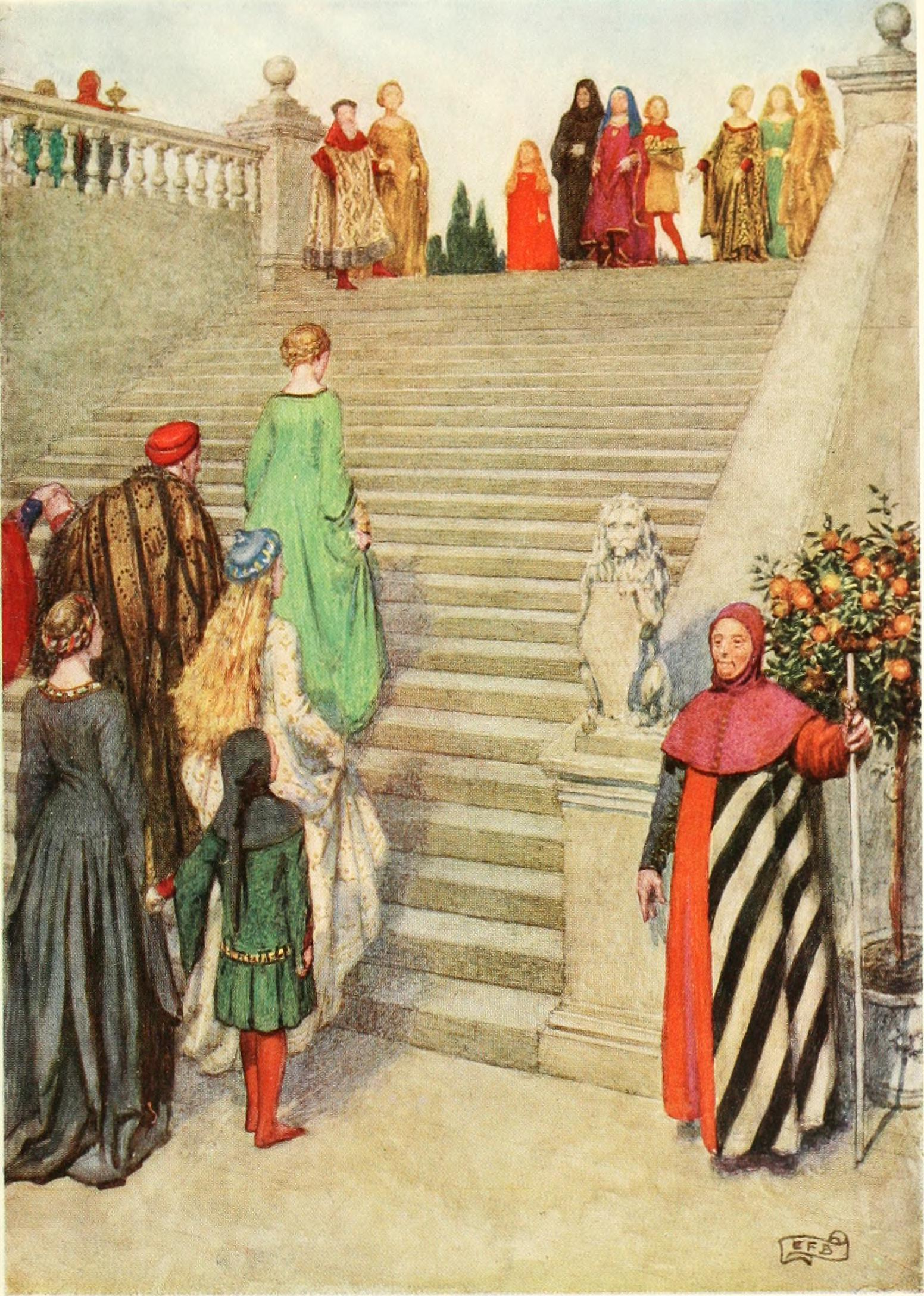
Dante and Beatrice

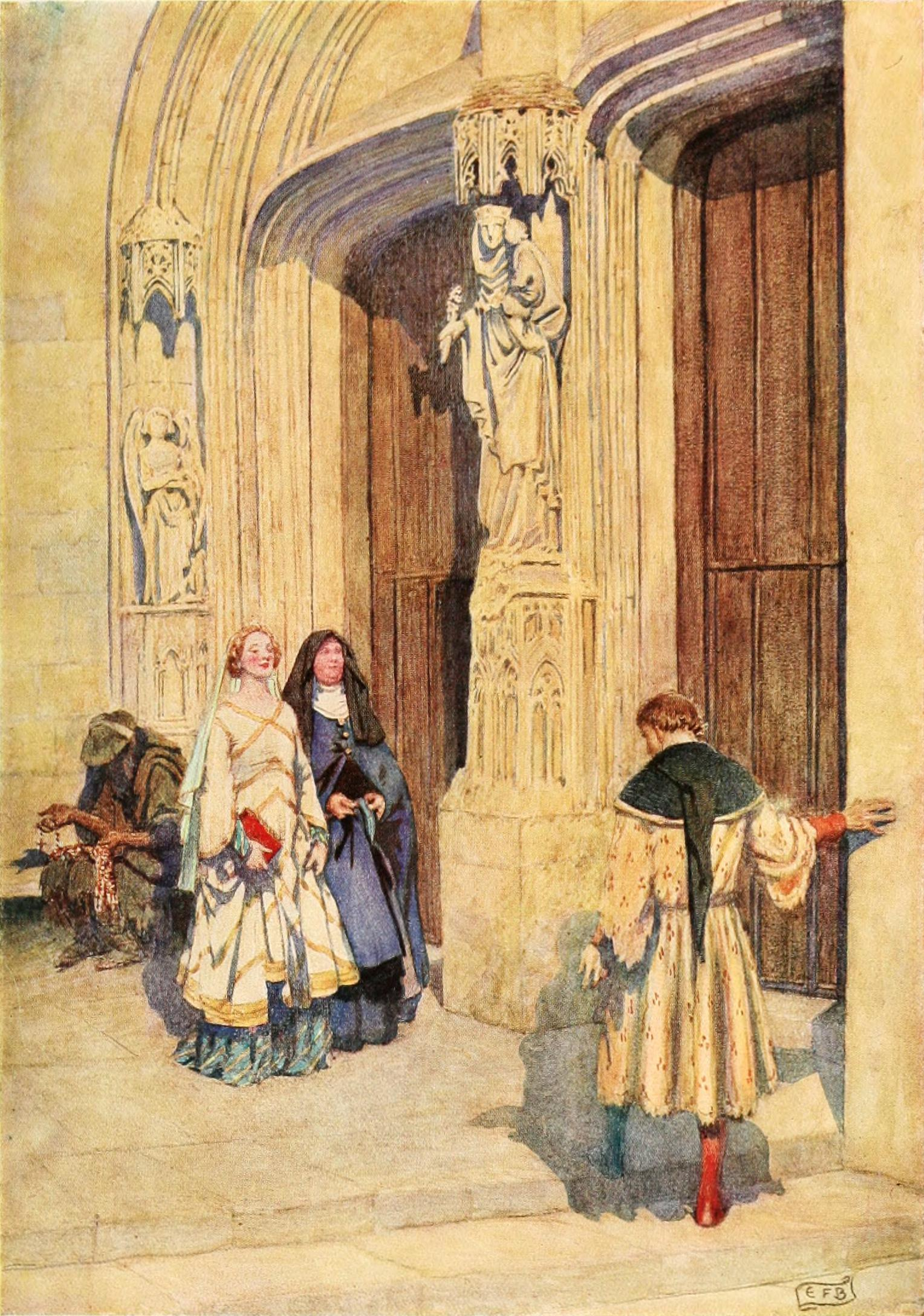
Laura and Petrarch

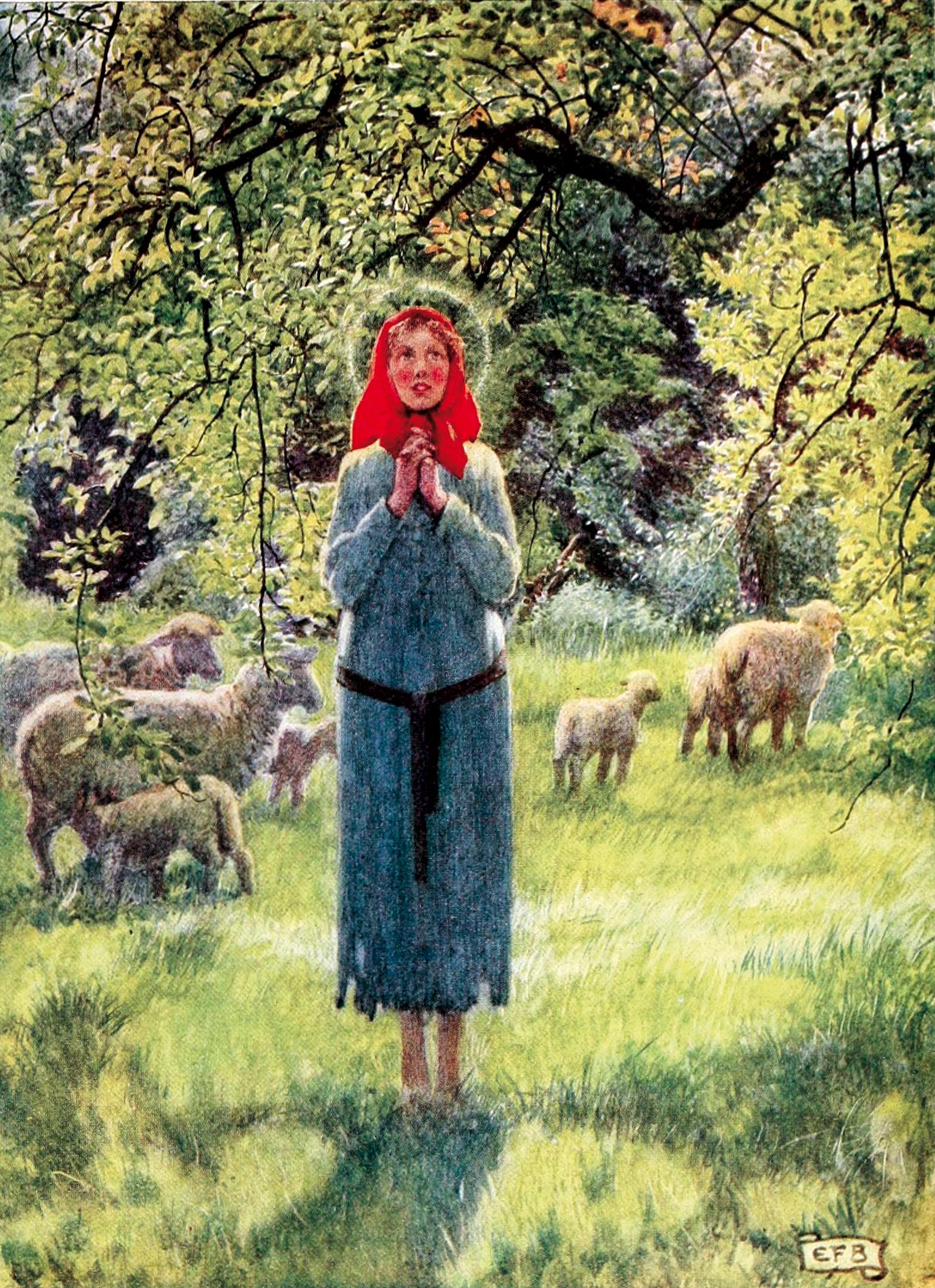
Joan of Arc

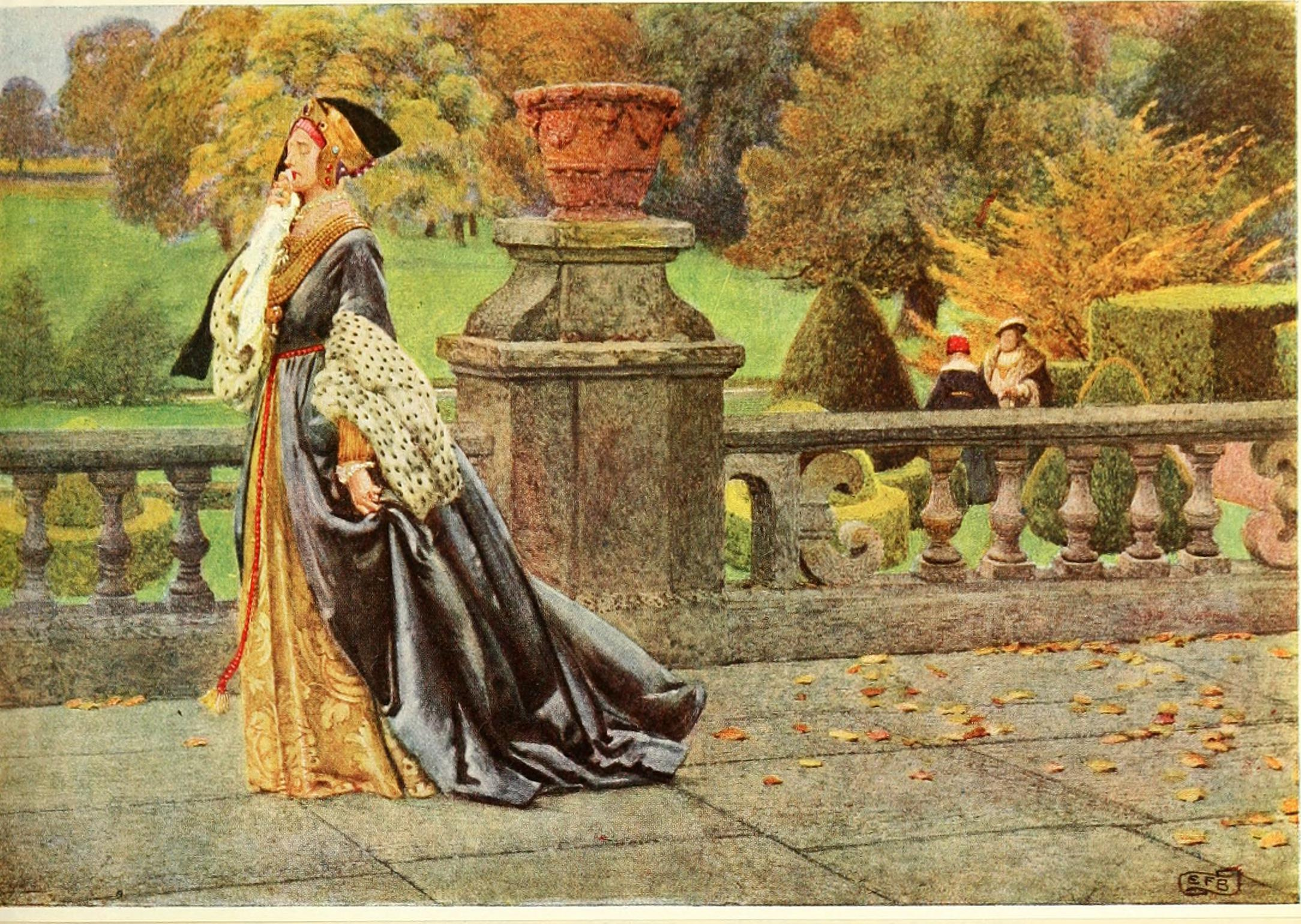
Catherine of Aragon

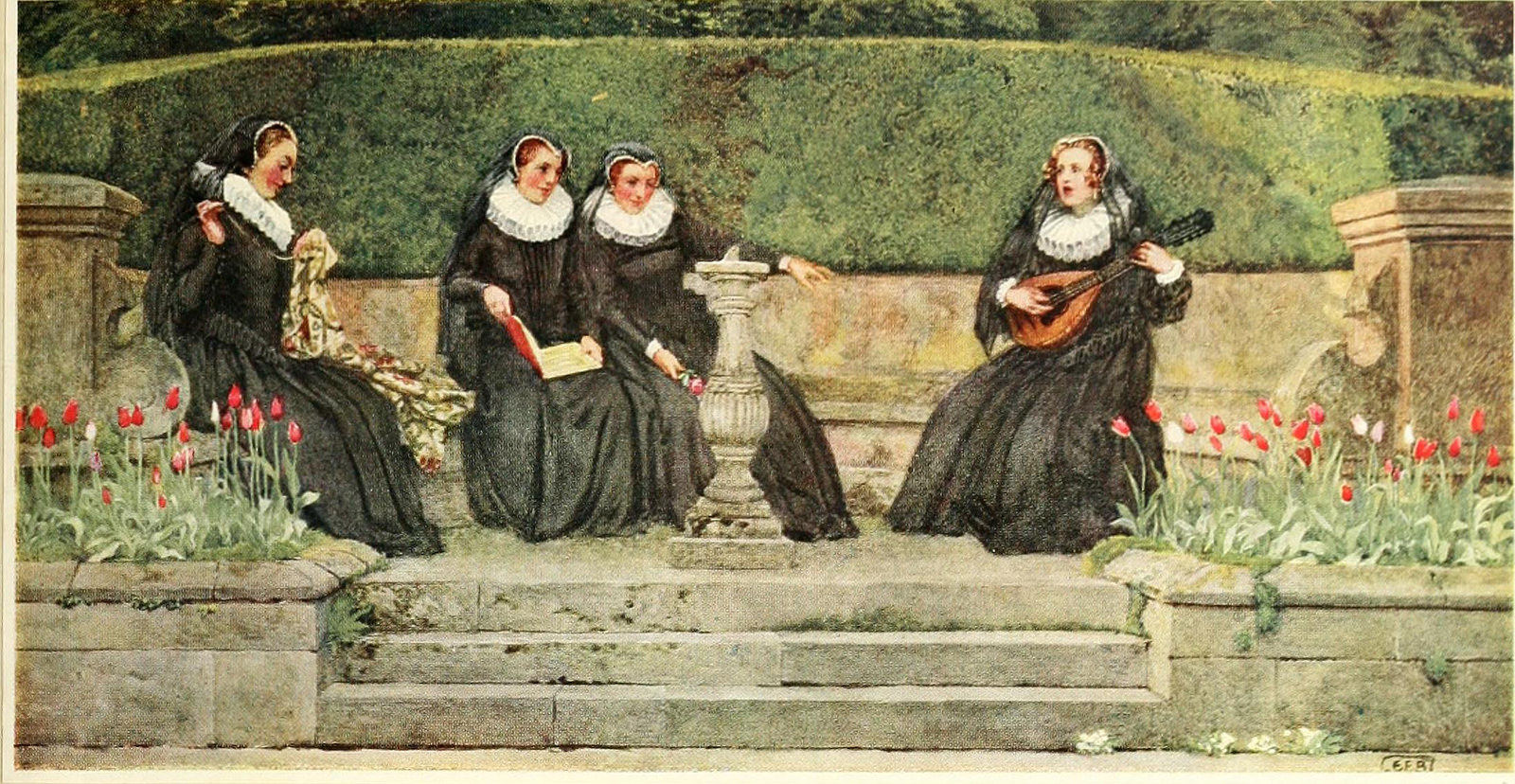
"Yestreen Queen Mary had four Maries, This night she'll hae but three; She had Mary Seaton, and Mary Beaton, And Mary Carmichael, and me" (Mary Hamilton)

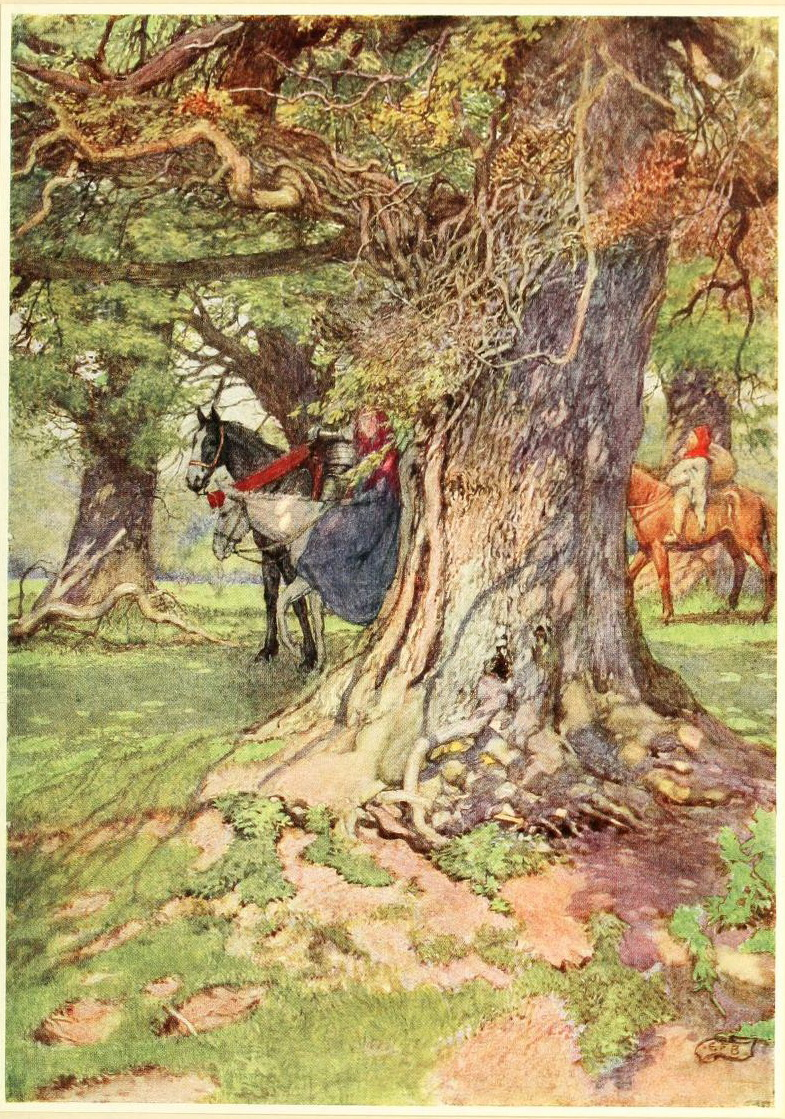
Una and The Red Cross Knight

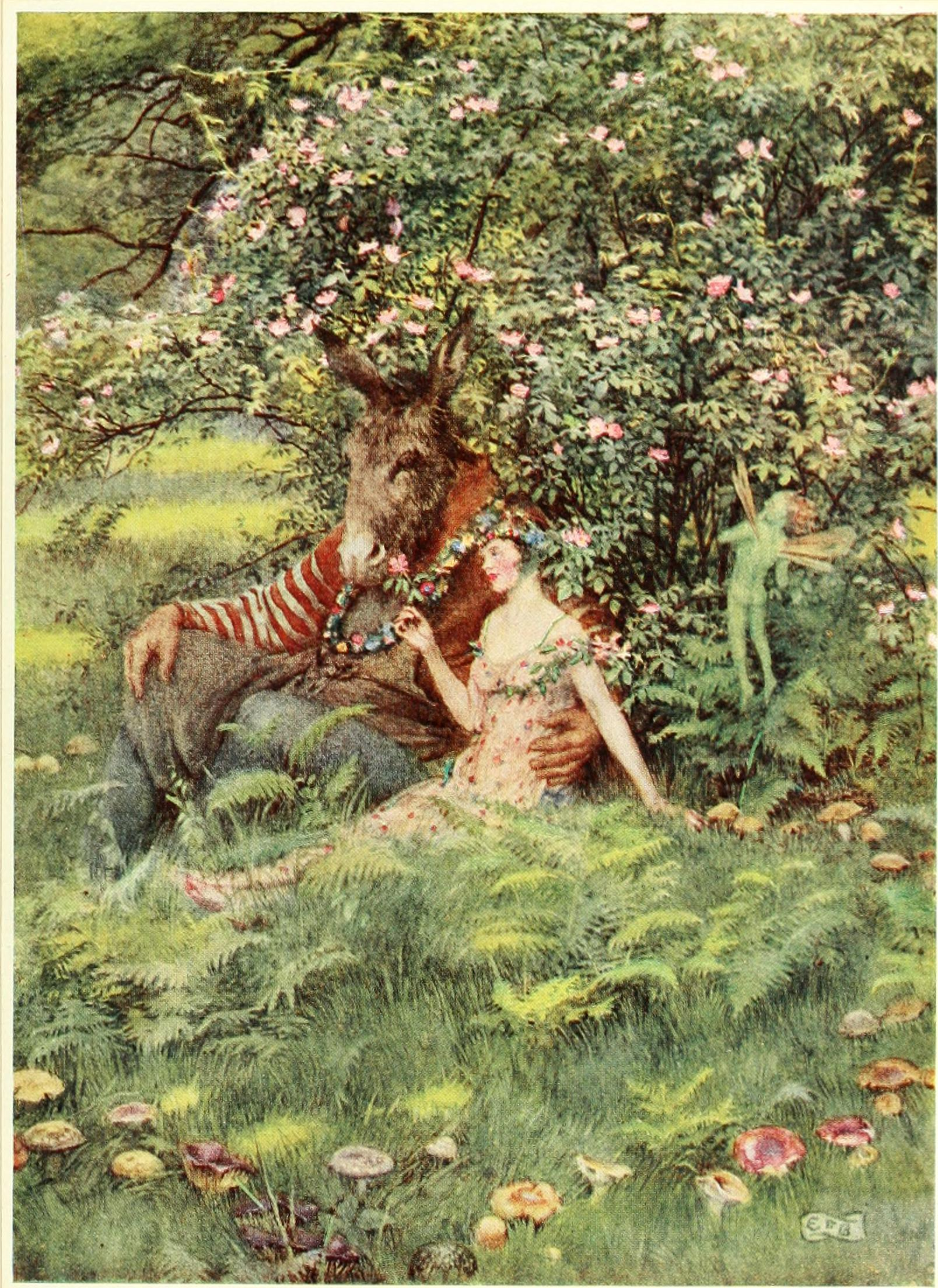
Bottom and Titania

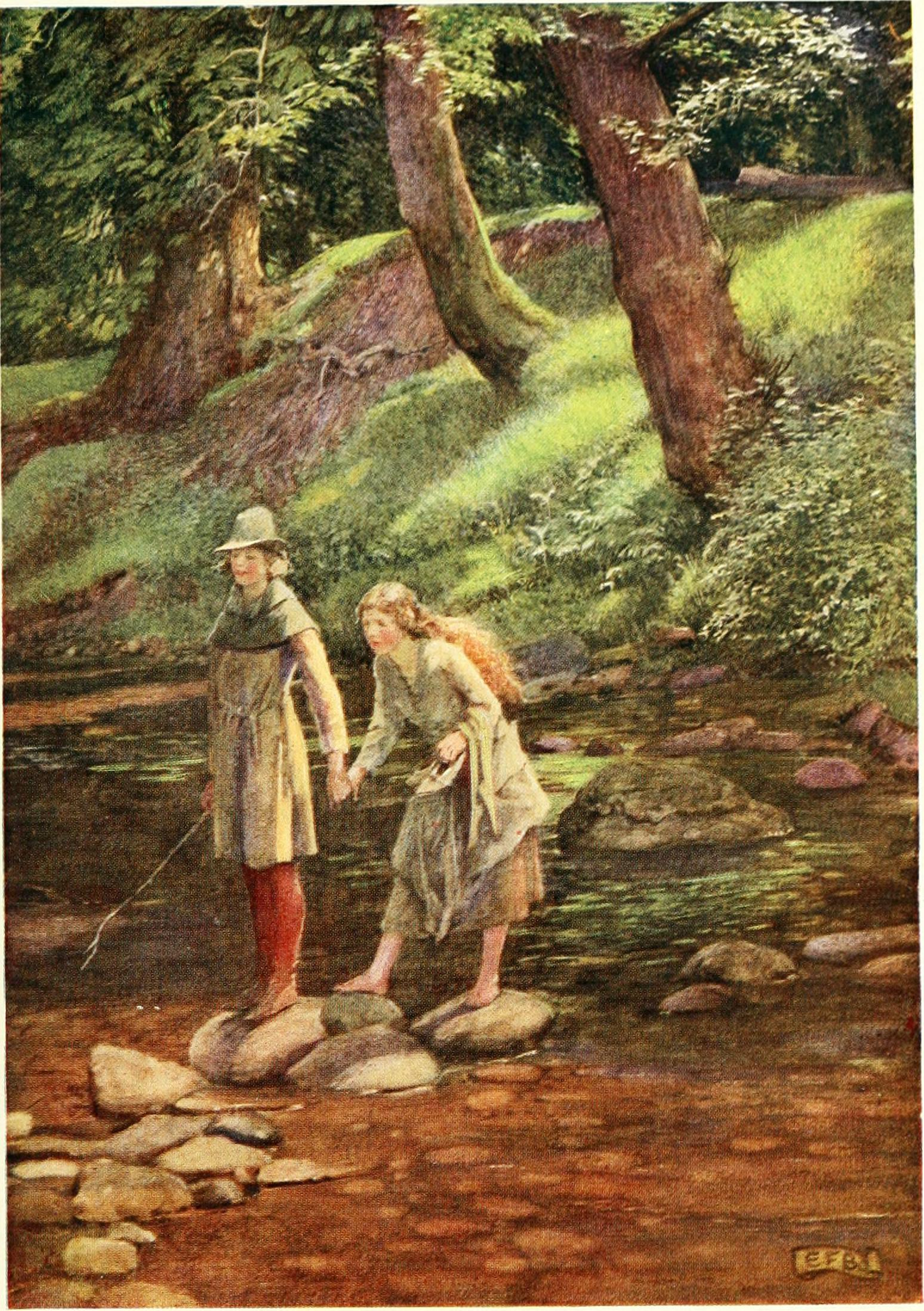
Rosalind and Celia

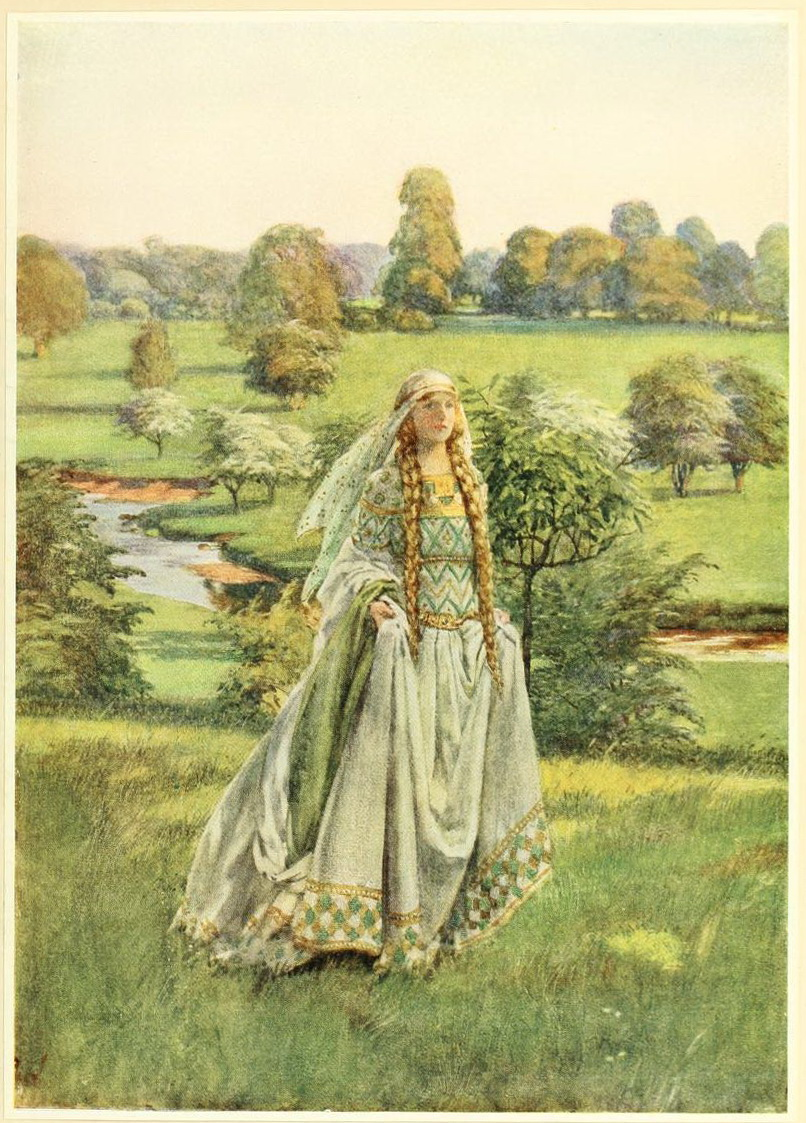
Guinevere

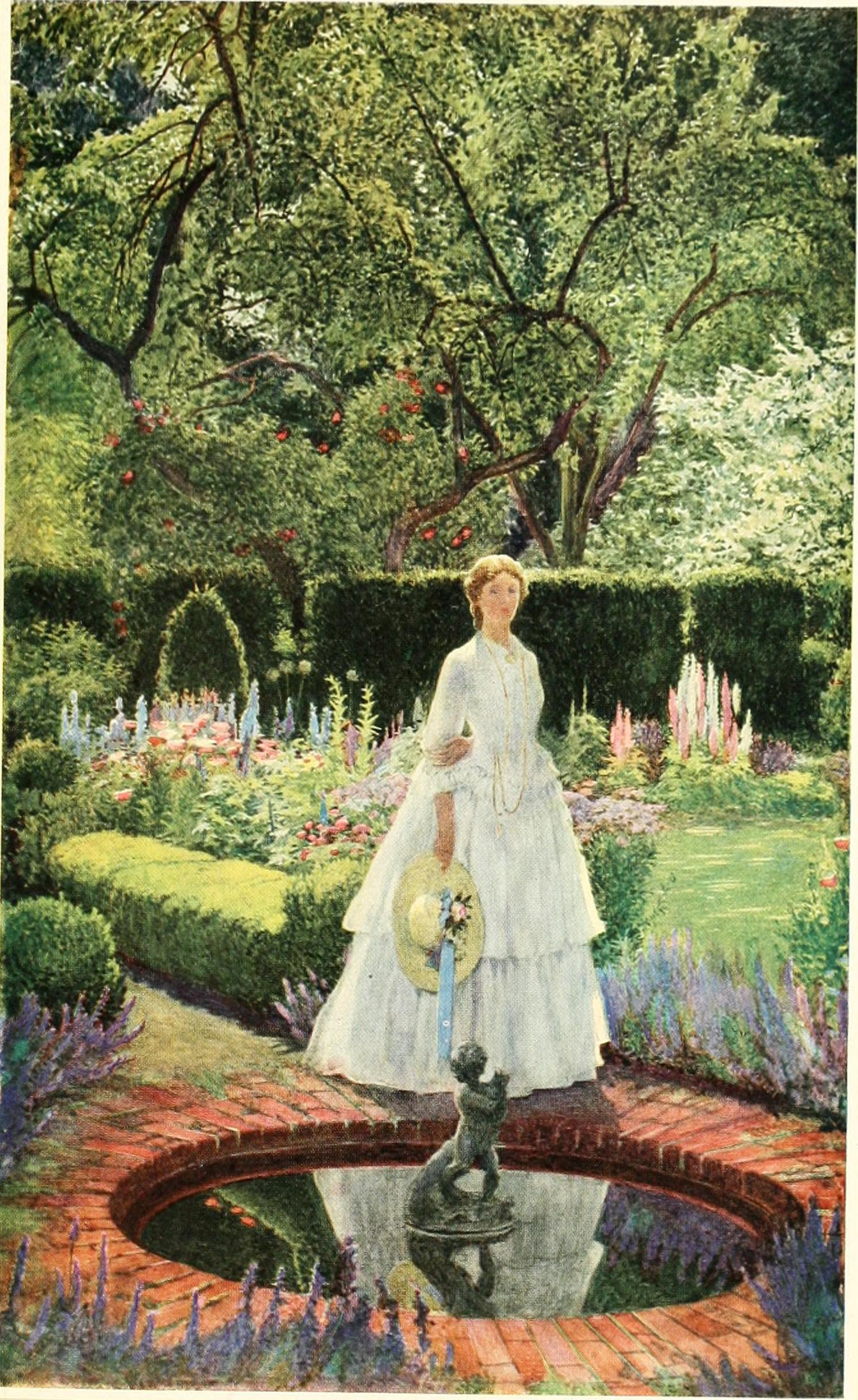
Maud is only seventeen

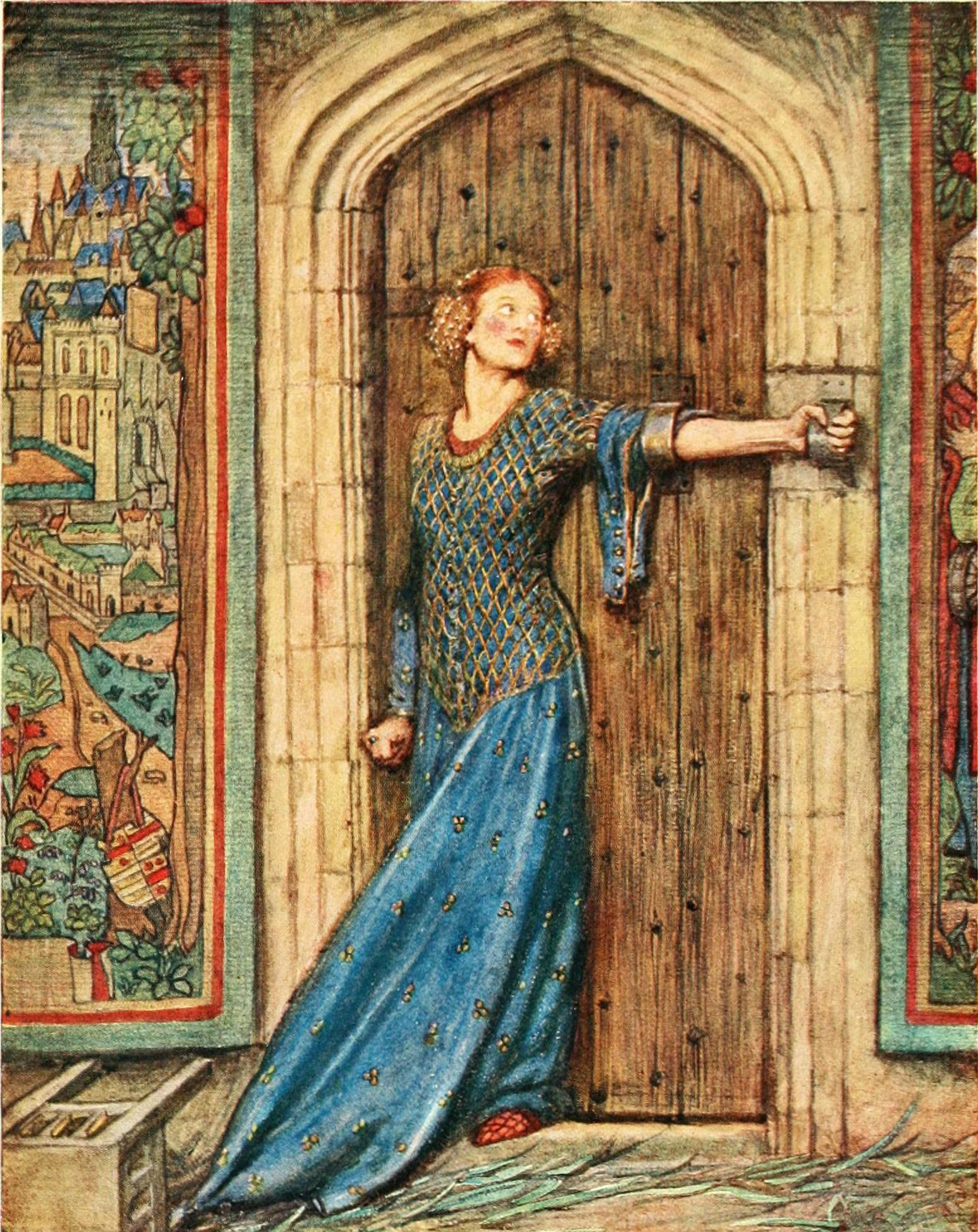
Kate Barlass

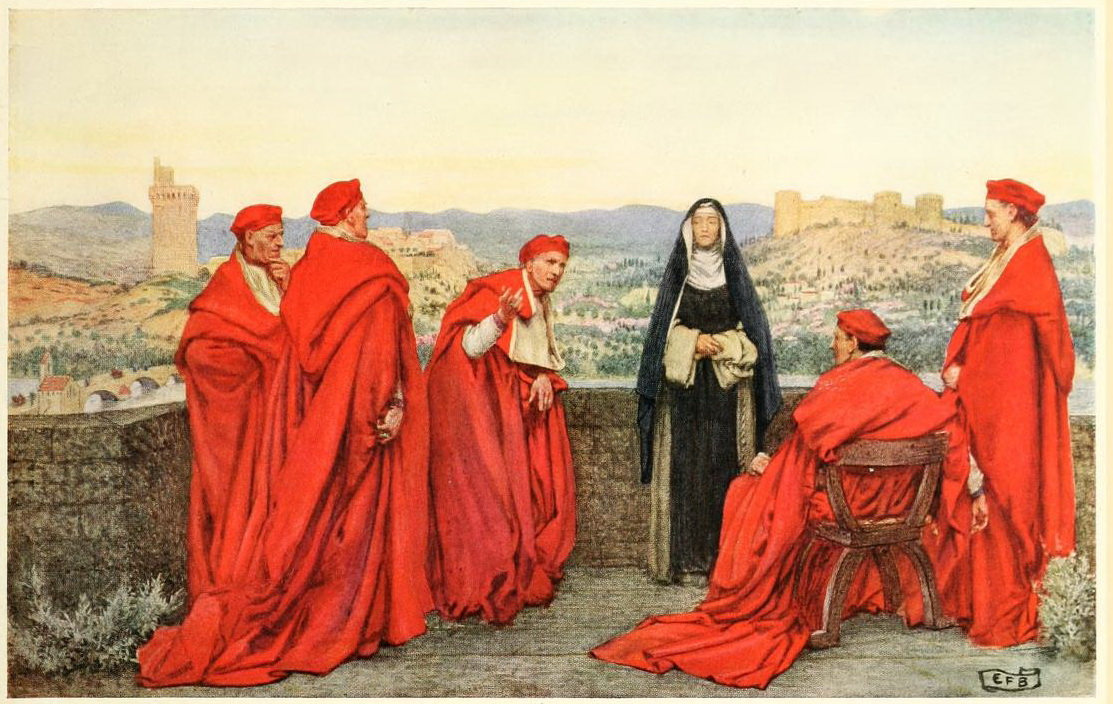
Catherine of Siena

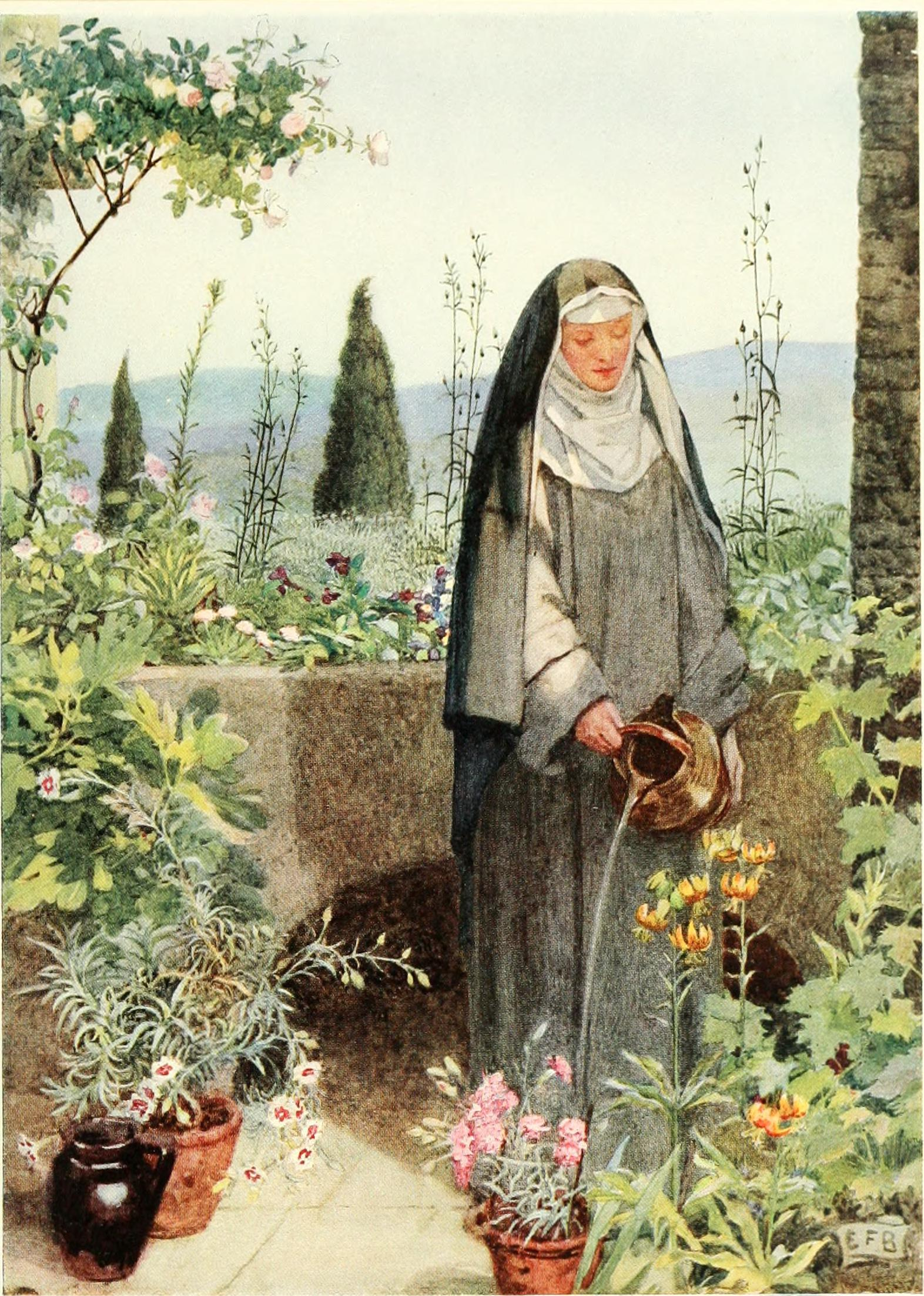
Clare of Assisi
