= Si può fare (album) =

Studio album by Angelo Branduardi
- Released: 1992
- Genre: Folk, Cantautore
- Label: EMI

Angelo Branduardi chronology
Musiche da film (1992)	Si può fare (1992)	Domenica e lunedì (1994)

Si può fare is an album by the Italian singer-songwriter Angelo Branduardi. It was released in 1992 by EMI Italiana.

== Track listing ==
- "Si può fare"
- "Il viaggiatore"
- "Noi, come fiumi"
- "Casanova"
- "Forte"
- "Indiani"
- "Cambia il vento, cambia il tempo"
- "L'ombra"
- "Devi trattarla bene"
- "Prima di ripartire"
