= Stefano Olivato =

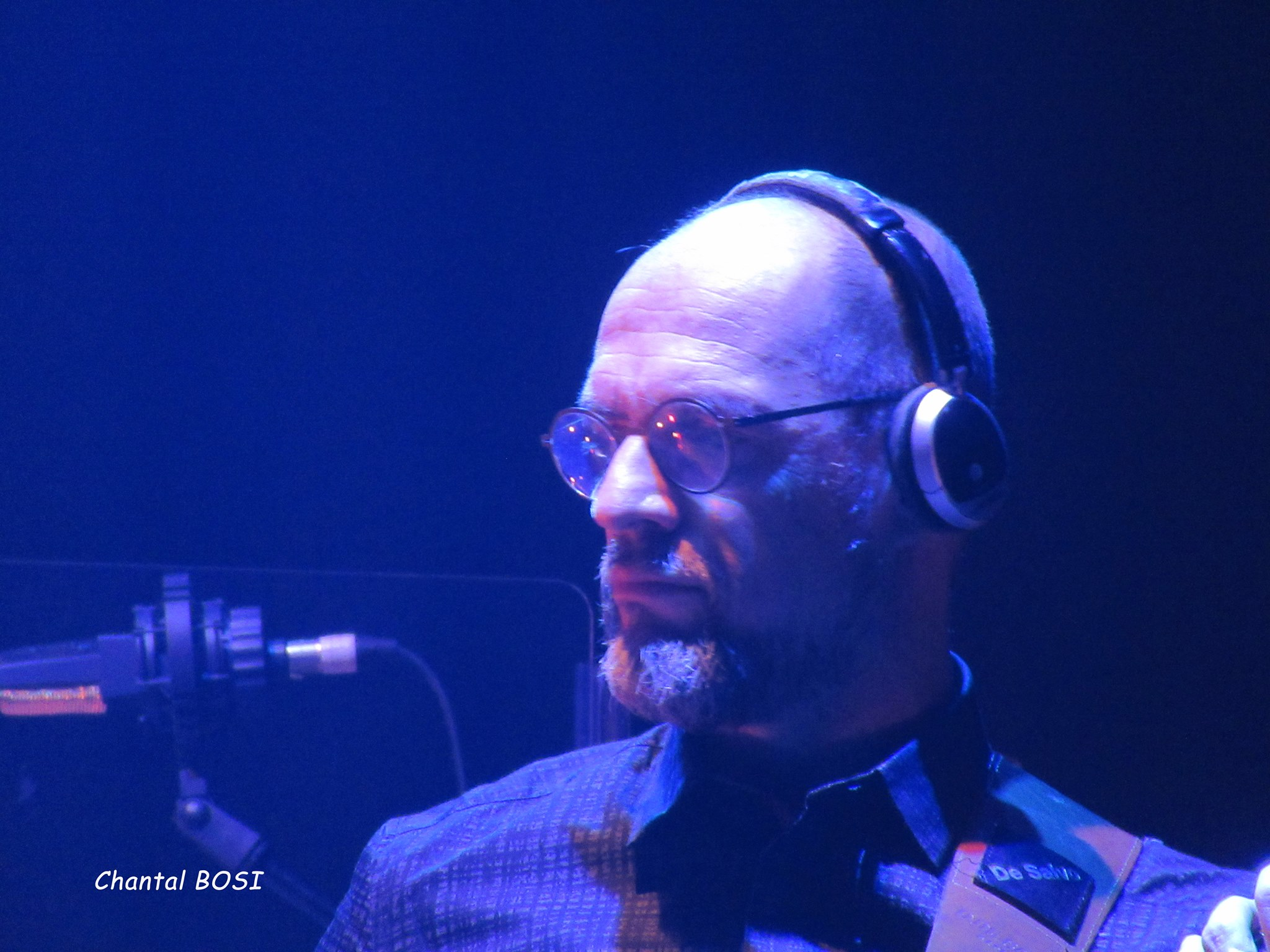
Stefano Olivato.

Stefano Olivato (born 1962) is an Italian bass and chromatic harmonica player.

== Biography ==
Olivato was born in Venice in 1962. He started off playing guitar, before switching to the bass guitar at around 16 years old.

In 1991 he participated in the second edition of the Festival di Sanscemo with the song "Nobili".

Stefano Olivato is the conductor of the Orchestra popolare di Venezia, which plays Venetian popular music; in October 2001 they played at Carnegie Hall in New York City. Since 2005 he has been on tour in Italy and around Europe with Angelo Branduardi.

In 2010 he won the Artist of the Year award at the first "Città di Mestre" contest. In July 2012 Lineeditions presented Vivaldi and Marcello Concerts for Harmonica and Bass Guitar, a tribute to Baroque music from Venice performed by Olivato on harmonica and bass guitar.

Together with Leonardo Pieri, he wrote "L'arrangiatore pop/rock", released in Venice in 2014 by Lineeditions.

== Other sources ==
- "Davide Ragazzoni e Stefano Olivato". Branduardi.org.
- "ANGELO BRANDUARDI - Tour". Europamici.com.
- "Conservatorio di Musica Arrigo Boito » Stefano Olivato". Conservatorio.pr.it.<
- "Olivato Stefano". Constp.it. October 2, 2018.
