= Catherine Douglas =

Scottish lady-in-waiting

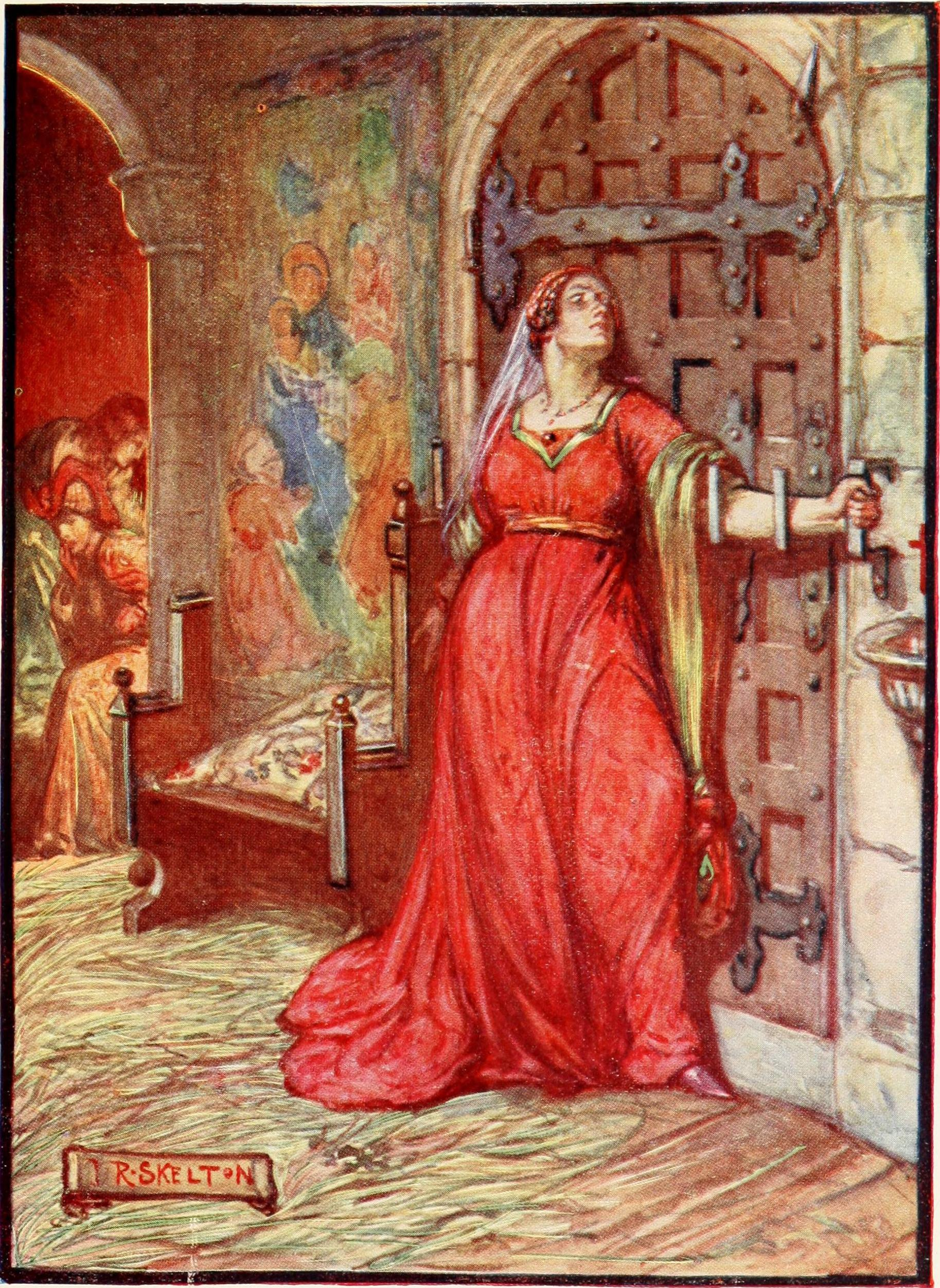
A depiction of female courage: 'Kate Barlass' in a children's history book from 1906

Catherine Douglas, later Barlass, was a 15th-century Scottish noblewoman who tried to prevent the assassination of King James I of Scotland on 20 February 1437. She was a lady-in-waiting to the Queen of Scots, Joan Beaufort.

She was a member of the powerful Clan Douglas, the daughter of Sir William Douglas of Lochleven and Lady Marjory Lindsay. Her mother was a daughter of David Lindsay, 1st Earl of Crawford and his wife, Elizabeth Stewart, daughter of Robert II, making her granddaughter of King Robert II.

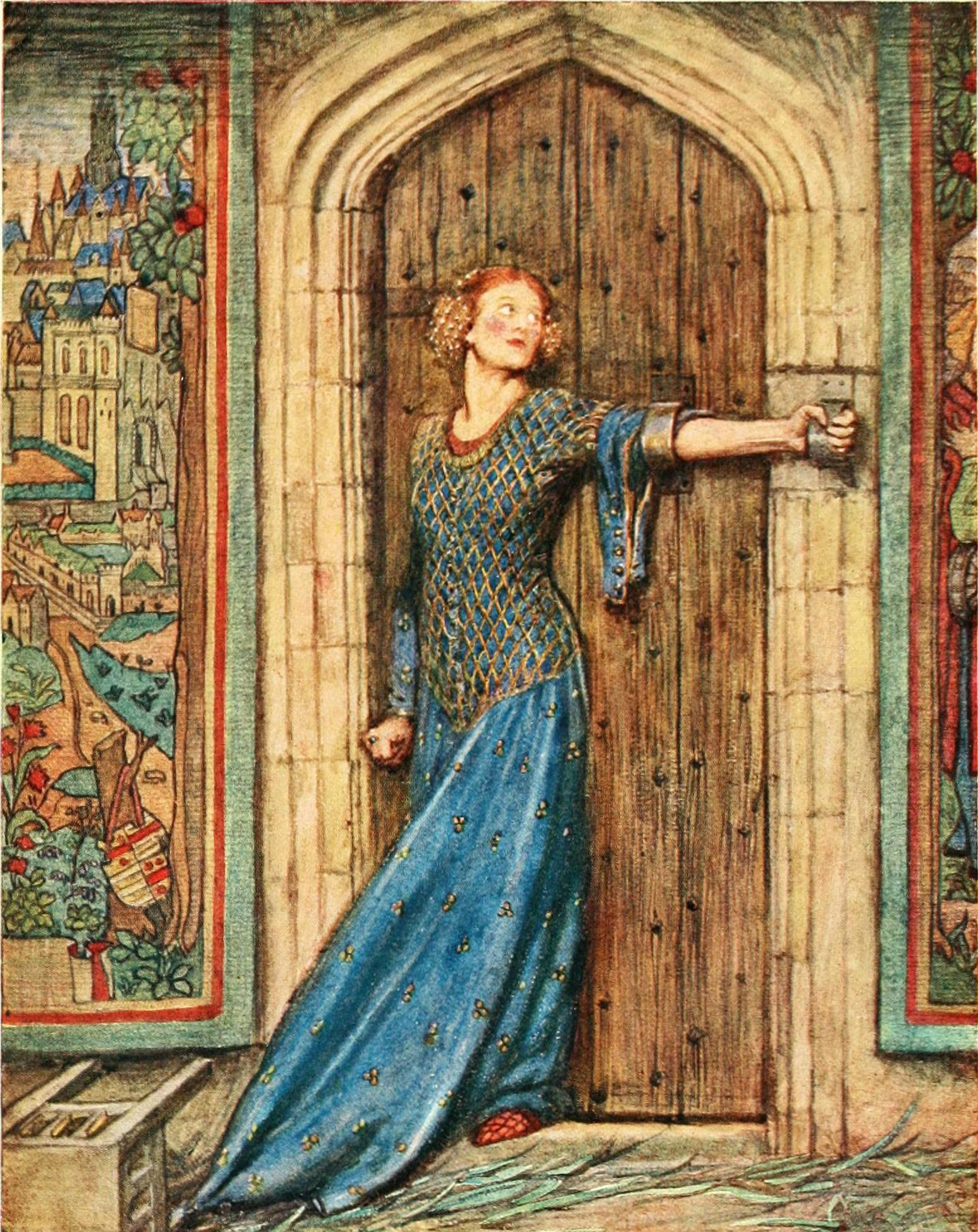
Illustration from Eleanor Fortesque-Brickdale's Golden book of famous women (1919)

Legend has it that during the King's stay at a Dominican chapter house in Perth, a group of men led by Sir Robert Graham came to the door searching for the King in order to kill him. The King's Chamberlain, Robert Stewart, Master of Atholl, had removed the bolt from the door of the room in which James and his queen were staying.

James fled into a sewer tunnel as the queen and her ladies quickly replaced the floorboards to hide his location. Catherine sprang to the door and placed her arm through the staples to bar the assassins' entrance. However, they forced the door open anyway, breaking Catherine's arm, and discovered and killed the King. From that point on, according to the story, Catherine took the surname of "Barlass".

The idiomatic phrase "Katie, bar the door!" (a warning of the approaching trouble) may have its origins in the story of Catherine Douglas. Dante Gabriel Rossetti recounted the story of Catherine Douglas in verse in 1881, under the title "The King's Tragedy". This poem contains the line "Catherine, keep the door!"

== Notes ==
- Marshall, Rosalind (2003) Scottish Queens, 1034–1714. Tuckwell Press.
- Rossetti, Dante Gabriel, The King's Tragedy: James I of Scots—20 February, 1437 (The "Catherine, keep the door" action begins at line 546.).
