= Anti-German sentiment =

Opposition to Germany, its inhabitants and culture

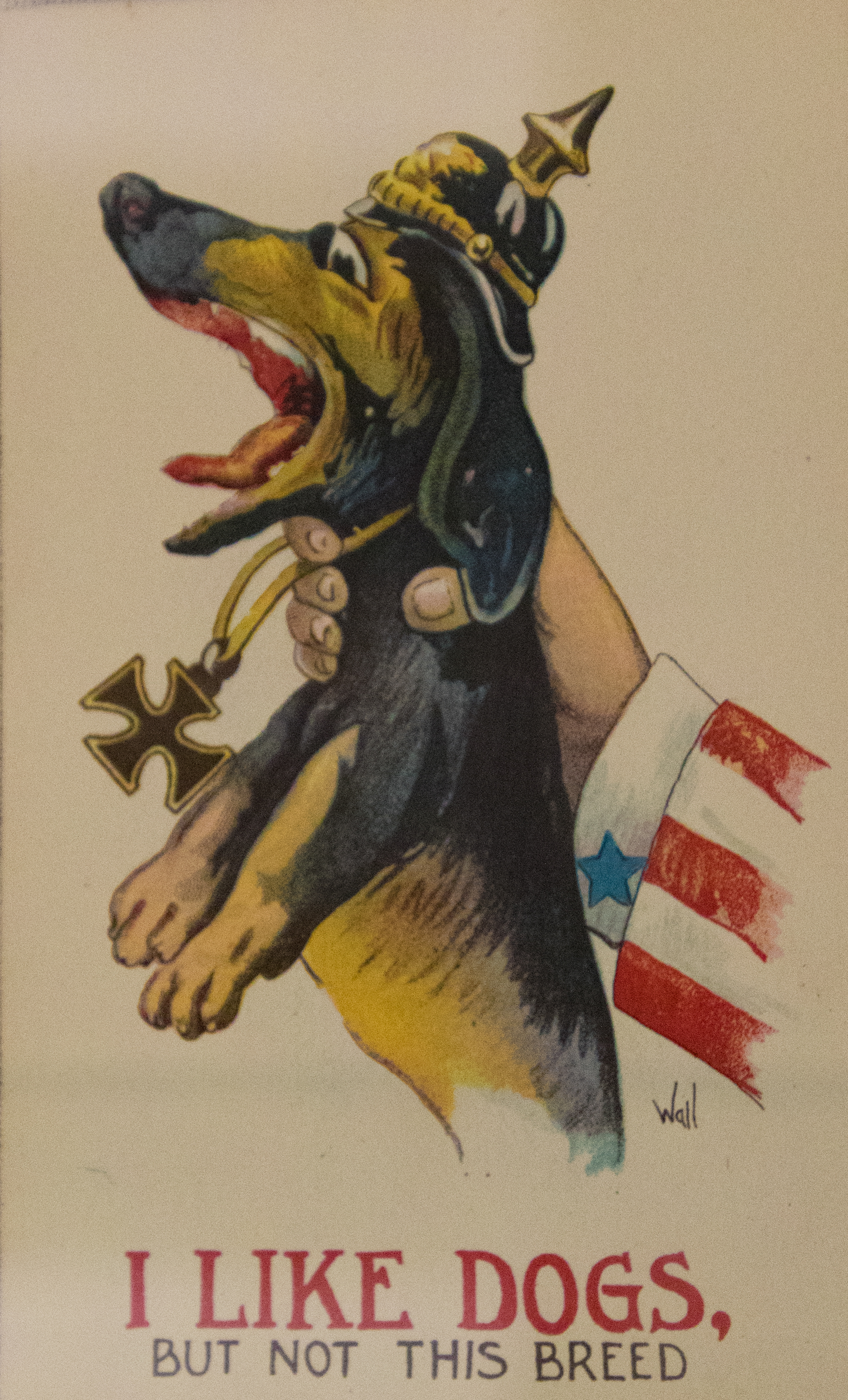
World War I Anti-German propaganda: a dachshund wearing a Pickelhaube and an Iron cross being strangled by Uncle Sam.

Anti-German sentiment (also known as anti-Germanism, Germanophobia or Teutophobia) is fear, dislike, prejudice, or discrimination of Germany, its people, and its culture. Its opposite is Germanophilia.

Traces of anti-German sentiment can be found in the High Middle Ages, with Ekkehard of Aura and Odo of Deuil writing about frictions between the Germans and the French. After Germany completed its unification in 1871, anti-Germanism grew among the other great powers, fueled largely by fears of Germany's rapid industrialisation. Germanophobia reached its height in the Allied countries during World War I and World War II. Anti-German and anti-Austrian sentiments were generally held together, as Austrians worked with and were involved in the German military, especially in Nazi Germany, with most Austrians considering themselves German until the end of World War II in Europe.

Following the collapse of Nazi Germany, anti-German sentiment generally decreased as Europe entered a period of peace. In modern times, anti-German sentiment usually comes about from the major power Germany has economically over Europe, and its importance in the European Union.

== History ==
=== Late 19th and early 20th centuries ===
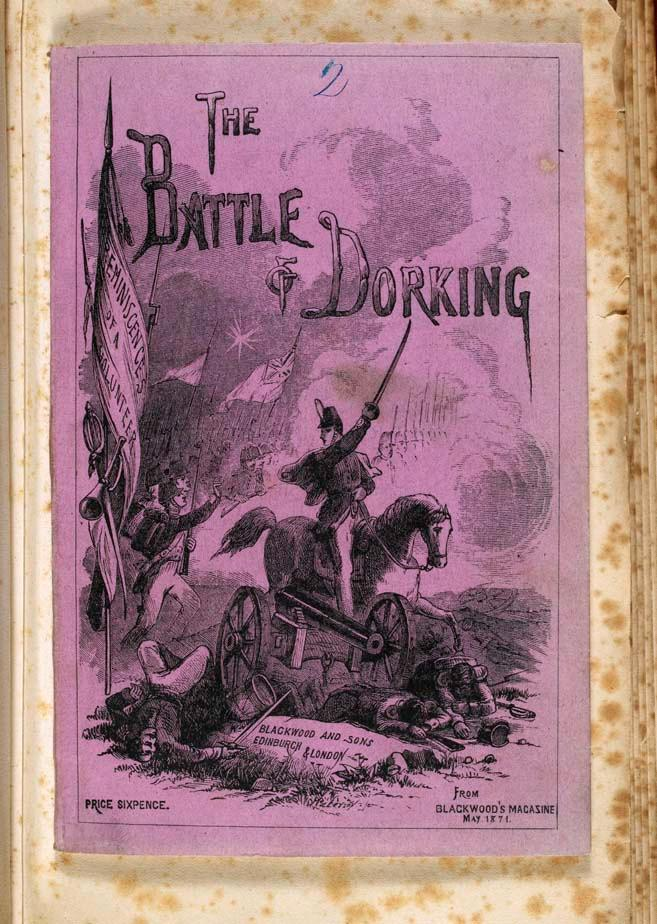
The Battle of Dorking (1871) in which England is invaded by Germany

During the 1700s and 1800s, many states in the United States allowed male non-citizens to vote. Anti-Irish and anti-German Catholic sentiment following the War of 1812 and intensifying again in the 1840s led many states, particularly in the Northeast, to amend their constitutions to prohibit non-citizens from voting. States that banned non-citizen voting during this time included New Hampshire in 1814, Virginia in 1818, Connecticut in 1819, New Jersey in 1820, Massachusetts in 1822, Vermont in 1828, Pennsylvania in 1838, Delaware in 1831, Tennessee in 1834, Rhode Island in 1842, Illinois in 1848, Ohio and Maryland in 1851, and North Carolina in 1856.

Negative comments in Britain about Germany were first made in the 1870s, following the Prussian victory in the Franco-Prussian War in 1870–71. British war planners believed that they needed to prevent a possible German invasion of Britain. German advances eventually led to the popularity of invasion novels, such as The Battle of Dorking, which first appeared in Blackwood's Magazine in the summer of 1871.

In the 1880s and 1890s, German immigrants in the UK were the targets of "some hostility"; interviewees for the Royal Commission on Alien Immigration believed that Germans were involved in prostitution and burglary, and many people also believed that Germans who were working in Britain were threatening the livelihoods of Britons by being willing to work for longer hours. Anti-German hostility began to intensify in early 1896 when Kaiser Wilhelm II sent the Kruger telegram to President Paul Kruger of the Transvaal congratulating him for repelling the British Jameson Raid. At that time, attacks on Germans in London were reported by the German press, but contrary to the reports, no attacks occurred. The Saturday Review suggested: "be ready to fight Germany, as Germania delenda est" ("Germany is to be destroyed"), an allusion to Cato the Elder's coda in the Second Punic War.

==== Rising political tensions ====
Following the signing of the Entente Cordiale alliance in 1904 between the United Kingdom and France, official relationships cooled, as did popular attitudes towards Germany and German residents in Britain. A fear of German militarism replaced a previous admiration for German culture and literature. At the same time, journalists produced a stream of articles on the threat posed by Germany. In the Daily Telegraph Affair of 1908–09, the Kaiser, in a badly misjudged attempt to show Germany's friendship towards England, said that he was among a minority of Germans friendly to Britain, that he had sent a military plan to Queen Victoria during the Boer War which the British Army had used successfully, and that Germany's fleet buildup was directed not against Britain but the "Yellow Peril" of the East.

Articles in Harmsworth's Daily Mail regularly advocated anti-German sentiments throughout the 20th century, telling their readers to refuse service at restaurants by Austrian or German waiters on the claim that they were spies and that if a German-sounding waiter claimed to be Swiss that they should demand to see the waiter's passport. At the same time, conspiracy theories which combined Germanophobia with antisemitism were concocted, they focused on the supposed foreign control of Britain, some of these conspiracy theories blamed Britain's entry into the Second Boer War on international German and Jewish financiers. Most of these ideas about German-Jewish conspiracies originated from right-wing figures such as Arnold White, Hilaire Belloc, and Leo Maxse, who used his publication the National Review to spread them.

==== Economic discrimination ====
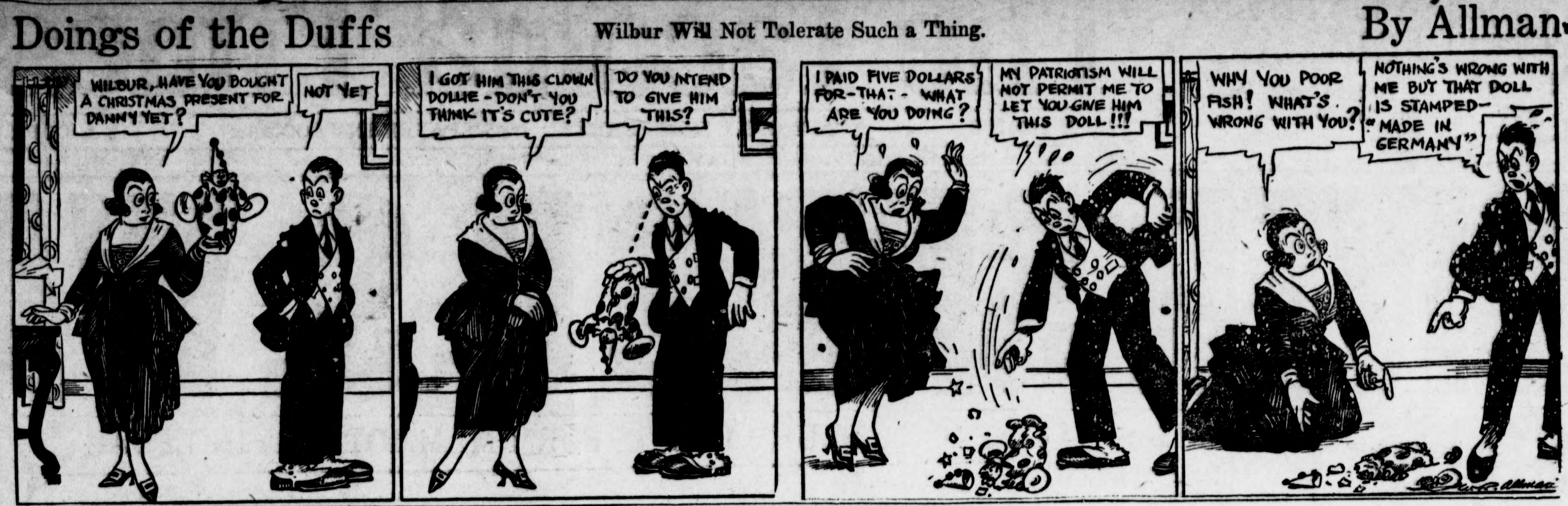
A 1917 comic strip in which the character smashes a clown doll because it was made in Germany

German food such as the sausage was deprecated by Germanophobes. In the late 19th century, the label Made in Germany was introduced in Britain by the Merchandise Marks Act 1887 (50 & 51 Vict. c. 28), to mark foreign produce more obviously, as foreign manufacturers had been falsely marking inferior goods with the marks of renowned British manufacturing companies and importing them into the United Kingdom. Most of these were found to be originating from Germany, whose government had introduced a protectionist policy to legally prohibit the import of goods in order to build up domestic industry.

=== Anglicization in the West ===
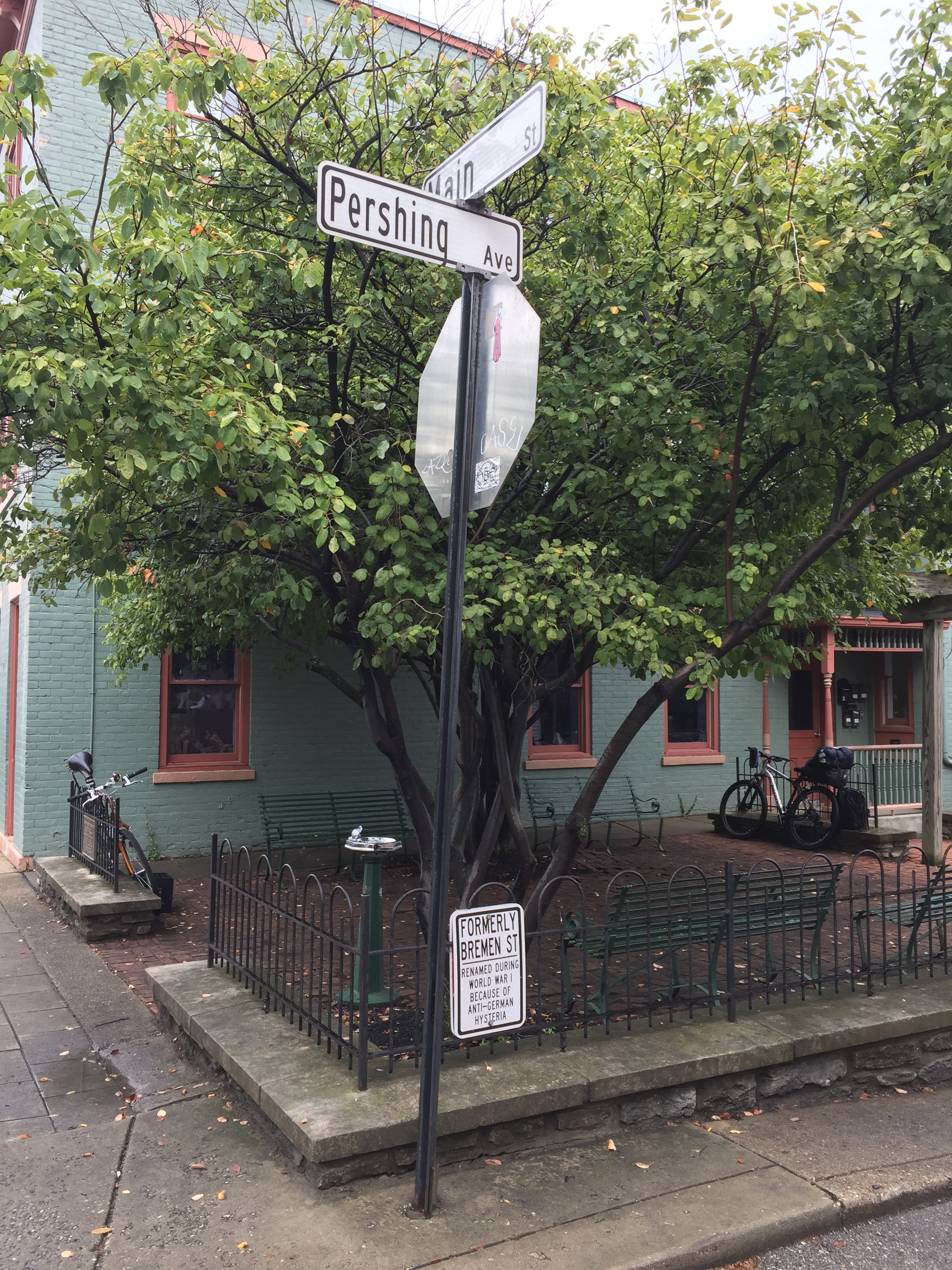
A sign in Covington, Kentucky, notes that a street name was changed from Bremen Street to Pershing Avenue due to "anti-German hysteria" during World War I.

In an attempt to further distance themselves from German culture, German street names in many cities were changed. German and Berlin streets in Cincinnati became English and Woodward; and Lubeck, Frankfort, and Hamburg Streets in Chicago were renamed Dickens, Charleston, and Shakespeare Streets. In New Orleans, Berlin Street was renamed in honor of General Pershing, head of the American Expeditionary Force. In Indianapolis, Bismarck Avenue and Germania Street were renamed Pershing Avenue and Belleview Street, respectively in 1917, and Brooklyn's Hamburg Avenue was renamed Wilson Avenue. In 1916, the city of Berlin in Canada was renamed to Kitchener, referring to Lord Kitchener, who was famously pictured on the "Lord Kitchener Wants You" recruiting posters. Several streets in Toronto that had previously been named for Liszt, Humboldt, Schiller, Bismarck, etc., were changed to names with strong British associations, such as Balmoral. Several streets in London which had been named after places in Germany or notable Germans also had their names changed; Berlin Road in Catford was renamed Canadian Avenue, and Bismarck Road in Islington was renamed Waterlow Road. In South Australia, Grunthal became Verdun and Krichauff became Beatty. In New South Wales, Germantown became Holbrook after the submarine commander Norman Douglas Holbrook.

Many businesses changed their names. In Chicago, German Hospital became Grant Hospital; likewise, the German Dispensary and the German Hospital in New York City were renamed Lenox Hill Hospital and Wyckoff Heights Hospital, respectively. In New York, the giant Germania Life Insurance Company became Guardian. Some words of German origin were changed, at least temporarily. Sauerkraut came to be called "liberty cabbage", German measles became "liberty measles", hamburgers became "liberty sandwiches" and dachshunds became "liberty pups". In Great Britain, the German Shepherd breed of dog was renamed to the euphemistic "Alsatian"; the English Kennel Club only re-authorised the use of 'German Shepherd' as an official name in 1977. The German biscuit was renamed the Empire biscuit.

Many schools stopped teaching German-language classes. The City College of New York continued to teach German courses, but reduced the number of credits that students could receive for them. Books published in German were removed from libraries or even burned. In Cincinnati, the public library was asked to withdraw all German books from its shelves. In Iowa, in the 1918 Babel Proclamation, Governor William L. Harding prohibited the use of all foreign languages in schools and public places. Nebraska banned instruction in any language except English, but the U.S. Supreme Court ruled that the ban was illegal in 1923 (Meyer v. Nebraska). In parallel with these changes, many German Americans elected to anglicize their names (e.g. Schmidt to Smith, Müller to Miller).

=== World War I ===
Destroy this mad brute—U.S. WWI propaganda poster (Harry R. Hopps; 1917). This poster portrays Germany as a gorilla invading the United States, having conquered continental Europe.

In 1914, when Germany invaded neutral Belgium and northern France, Imperial German Army regularly court martialed Belgian and French civilians under German military law for offenses including espionage, perfidy, or being francs-tireurs, and executed 6,500 of them. These acts, referred to as the Rape of Belgium, were both exploited and exaggerated by the governments of the Allied Powers, who produced atrocity propaganda dehumanizing Germans as gorilla-like Huns who were all racially inclined to sadism and violence.

A vocal source of criticism of Theodore Roosevelt and Woodrow Wilson's "anti-hyphen" ideology and particularly to their demands for "100% Americanism" came from America's enormous number of White ethnic immigrants and their descendants. Criticism from these circles occasionally argued that "100% Americanism" really meant Anglophilia and a Special Relationship with the British Empire, as particularly demonstrated by demands for tolerating only the English language in the United States. In a letter published on 16 July 1916 in the Minneapolis Journal, Edward Goldbeck, a member of Minnesota's traditionally large German-American community, sarcastically announced that his people would "abandon the hyphen", as soon as English-Americans did so. Meanwhile, he argued, "Let the exodus of Anglo-Americans start at once! Let all those people go who think that America is a new England!" A much smaller minority of German Americans came out openly for Germany. Similarly, Harvard psychology professor Hugo Münsterberg dropped his efforts to mediate between America and Germany, and threw his efforts behind the German war effort.

The Justice Department attempted to prepare a list of all German aliens, counting approximately 480,000 of them. The Committee of Internment of Alien Enemies recommended sending them to internment camps, though the idea was opposed by the War Department and the Attorney General. More than 4,000 German aliens were imprisoned in 1917–1918; the allegations included spying for Germany and endorsing the German war effort.

When the United States entered the war in 1917, some German Americans were looked upon with suspicion and attacked regarding their loyalty. Propaganda posters and newspaper commentary fed the growing fear. In Wisconsin, a Lutheran minister faced suspicion for hosting Germans in his home, while a language professor was tarred and feathered for having a German name and teaching the language. In Collinsville, Illinois, German-born Robert Prager was dragged from jail as a suspected spy and lynched. The Red Cross barred individuals with German last names from joining in fear of sabotage. Some aliens were convicted and imprisoned on charges of sedition for refusing to swear allegiance to the United States war effort. Thousands were forced to buy war bonds to show their loyalty.

In Nashville, Tennessee, Luke Lea, the publisher of The Tennessean, together with "political associates", attempted to declare German-born Edward Bushrod Stahlman an "alien enemy" during World War I. Stahlman was the publisher of a competing newspaper, the Nashville Banner. The offices of a pro-German socialist newspaper, the Philadelphia Tageblatt, were visited by federal agents after war broke out to investigate the citizenship status of its staff and would later be raided by federal agents under the powers of the Espionage Act of 1917, and six members of its organization would eventually be arrested for violations of the Espionage Act among other charges after publishing a number of pieces of pro-German propaganda.

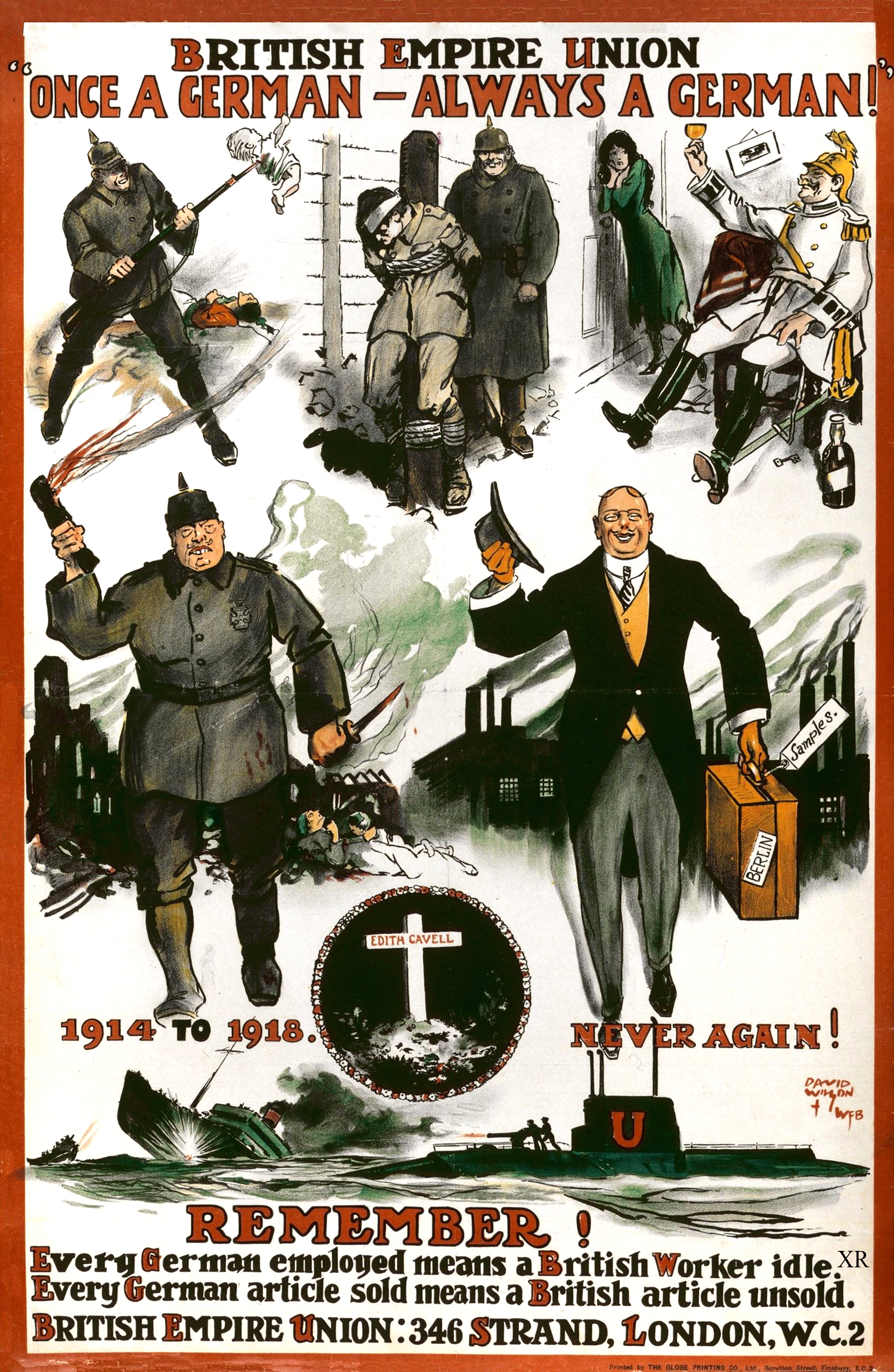
Propaganda poster, c. 1919, from the British Empire Union calling for boycott of German goods and depicting German businesspeople selling their products in Britain as "the other face" of German soldiers who committed atrocities during World War I

In Great Britain, anti-German feeling led to infrequent rioting, assaults on suspected Germans and the looting of businesses owned by people with German-sounding names, which occasionally took an antisemitic tone. Increasing anti-German hysteria threw suspicion upon the British royal family; King George V was persuaded to change his German name of Saxe-Coburg and Gotha to Windsor and relinquish all German titles and styles on behalf of his relatives who were British subjects. Prince Louis of Battenberg was not only forced to change his name to Mountbatten, he was forced to resign as First Sea Lord, the most senior position in the Royal Navy.

Attitudes to Germany were not entirely negative among British troops fighting on the Western Front; Robert Graves, who, like the King, also had German relatives, wrote shortly after the war during his time at Oxford University as an undergraduate that "Pro-German feeling had been increasing. With the war over and the German armies beaten, we could give the German soldier credit for being the most efficient fighting man in Europe ... Some undergraduates even insisted that we had been fighting on the wrong side: our natural enemies were the French." British writer Nicholas Shakespeare quoted a statement from a letter written by his grandfather during the First World War in which he says he would rather fight the French and describes German bravery.

=== Pre-World War II ===
On 25 July 1937, NKVD Order No. 00439 led to the arrest of 55,005 German citizens and former citizens in the Soviet Union, of whom 41,898 were sentenced to death. The Soviets were not successful in expelling all ethnic Germans living in Western and Southern Ukraine due to the rapid advance of the Wehrmacht. The secret police, the NKVD, was able to deport only 35% of the ethnic Germans in Ukraine. Thus in 1943, the Nazi German census registered 313,000 ethnic Germans living in the occupied territories of the Soviet Union. With the Soviet advance, the Wehrmacht evacuated about 300,000 Russian Germans to the Reich. Under the Yalta Agreement, the Allies mandated the repatriation of Soviet citizens living in Germany at the war's end. More than 200,000 Russian Germans were deported, mostly by force, by the Western Allies and sent to special settlements (exile). Thus, shortly after the end of the war, more than one million ethnic Germans from Russia were in special settlements and labor camps in Siberia and Central Asia. It is estimated that 200,000 to 300,000 died of starvation, lack of shelter, overwork and disease during the 1940s. Later during the war, Germans were suggested to be used for forced labour. The Soviet Union began deporting ethnic Germans in their territories and using them for forced labour. Although by the end of 1955, they had been acquitted of criminal accusations, no rights to return to their former home regions were granted, nor were the former self-determination rights returned to them. Near the end of World War II and during the occupation of Germany, Soviet forces invaded German villages and raped German women en masse. It is believed by historian Antony Beevor that "a 'high proportion' of at least 15 million women who lived in the Soviet zone or were expelled from Germany's eastern provinces were raped."

=== World War II ===
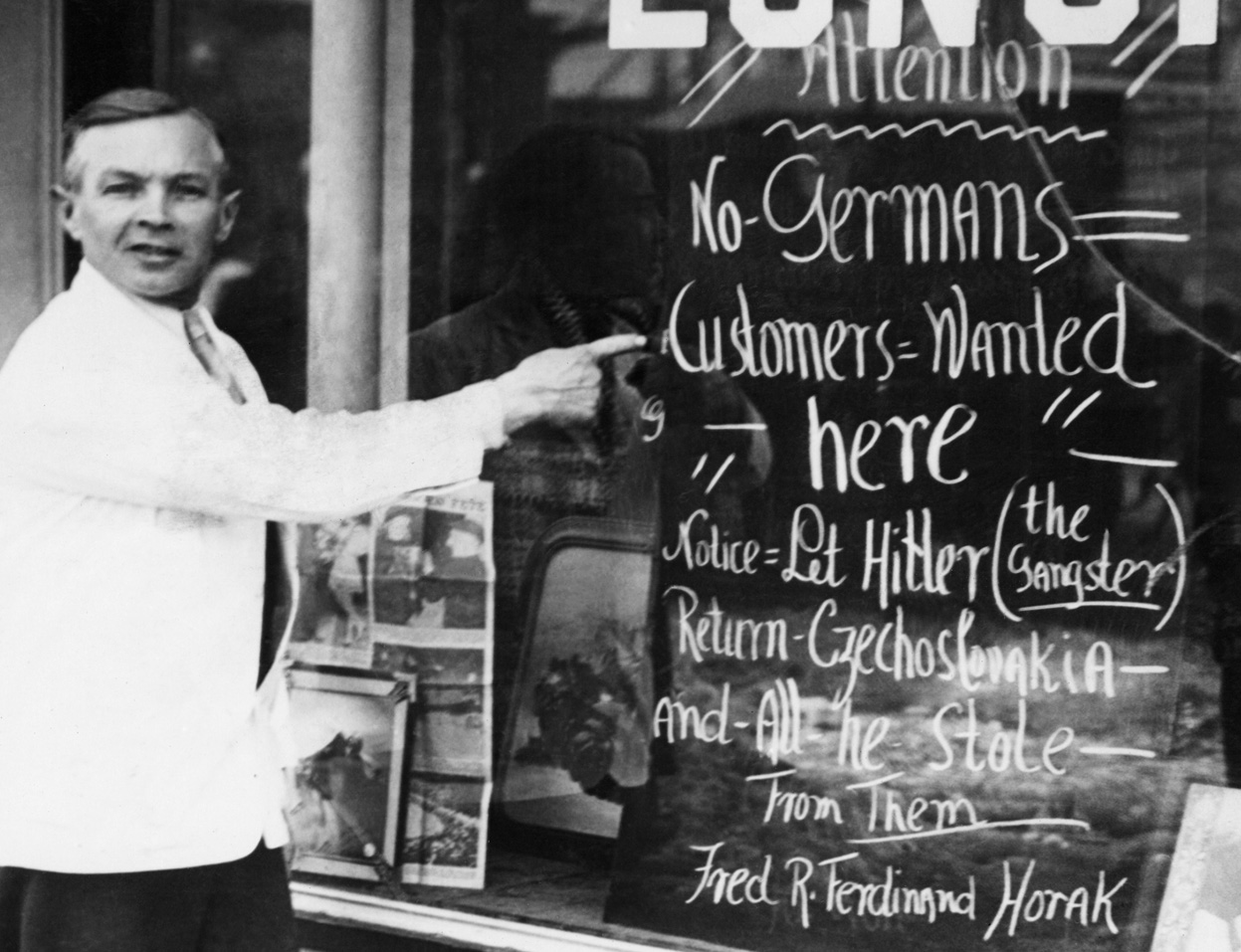
Prague-born restaurant owner Fred Horak of Somerville, Massachusetts, putting up a sign barring German customers from entering his property until "Hitler the Gangster" returns the lands seized from Czechoslovakia, 18 March 1939

Between 1931 and 1940, 114,000 Germans and thousands of Austrians moved to the United States, many of whom – including Nobel-prize winner Albert Einstein, Lion Feuchtwanger, Bertold Brecht, Henry Kissinger, Arnold Schoenberg, Hanns Eisler and Thomas Mann – were either Jewish Germans or anti-Nazis fleeing Nazi oppression. About 25,000 people became paying members of the pro-Nazi German American Bund during the years before the war. The October 1939 seizure by the German pocket battleship Deutschland of the US freighter SS City of Flint, as it had 4000 tons of oil for Britain on board, provoked much anti-German sentiment in the US.

The so-called "Vansittartism" of Robert Vansittart, 1st Baron Vansittart in Great Britain portrayed Germans as inherently militaristic and violent. In the U.S., works such as John Boylan's Sequel to the Apocalypse: The Uncensored Story: How Your Dimes and Quarters Helped Pay for Hitler's War (1942) promoted opposition to German commercial practices and to Germans in general.

Germans murdered millions of people in state-sponsored genocides during World War II, turning many families and friends of the victims anti-German. The Alien Registration Act of 1940 required 300,000 German-born resident aliens who had German citizenship to register with the U.S. Federal government, and restricted their travel and property-ownership rights. In 1941, the American writer Theodore N. Kaufman published Germany Must Perish!, a book in which he advocated genocide through the compulsory sterilization of all Germans and the territorial dismemberment of Germany, which he argued would achieve world peace.

==== Refusal to hire German-Americans ====
With the war ongoing in Europe but the United States remaining neutral until late 1941, a massive defense buildup took place in the U.S., requiring many new employees. Private companies sometimes refused to hire any non-citizen, or American citizens of German or Italian ancestry — this would allegedly have threatened the morale of loyal Americans. President Franklin Roosevelt considered this "stupid" and "unjust". In June 1941, he issued Executive Order 8802 and set up the Fair Employment Practice Committee, which also protected Black Americans. President Roosevelt sought out Americans of German ancestry for top war-jobs, including General Dwight D. Eisenhower, Admiral Chester W. Nimitz, and General Carl Andrew Spaatz. He appointed Republican Wendell Willkie as a personal representative. German Americans who had fluent German-language skills became an important asset to wartime intelligence, serving as translators and as spies for the United States. The war evoked strong pro-American patriotic sentiments among German Americans, few of whom by then had contacts with distant relatives in the old country.

==== Internment of Germans ====
Under the still-active Alien Enemy Act of 1798, the United States government interned 11,507 German citizens between 1940 and 1948. An unknown number of "voluntary internees" joined their families in the camps and were not permitted to leave. After the United States entered the war against Nazi Germany on 11 December 1941, the US Government interned a number of German and Italian citizens as enemy aliens. The exact number of German and Italian internees is a subject of debate. In some cases, American-born family members volunteered to accompany internees into internment camps in order to keep family units together. The last to be released remained in custody until 1948.

Anti-German sentiment also flourished in Canada during World War II; under the War Measures Act of 1914, some 26 POW camps opened and were filled with those who had been born in Germany, in Italy, and particularly in Japan, if they were deemed to be "enemy aliens". For Germans, this applied especially to single males who had some association with the National Unity Party of Canada. No compensation was paid to them after the war. In Ontario, the largest internment centre for German Canadians, Camp Petawawa, housed 750 persons born in Germany and Austria. Although some residents of internment camps were Germans who had already immigrated to Canada, the majority of Germans in such camps came from Europe; most were prisoners of war. (Note: "The first German prisoners arrived in Canada in the days following the declaration of war. They were either Jewish refugees or enemy merchant seamen. Prisoners of war soon followed. They were first received at stations located near major urban centers like Montreal, Toronto, Kingston, Vancouver, Niagara, etc. These stations were temporary receiving camps since the "permanent" camps were not yet ready. Many other prisoners are added over the years. The majority of the prison population in Canadian internment camps were made up of Germans.") 711 Jewish refugees fleeing the Nazi regime in Europe were interned at Camp B70 in Ripples, New Brunswick, at the request of Winston Churchill, who worried that there could be German spies among their number. The prisoners were subjected to forced labor, including felling lumber and chopping wood to heat the camp. After a year of internment, the refugees — now seen as valuable to the war effort — received the option to participate in the war or to find sponsorship in Canada. The camp closed temporarily in 1941, then became a prisoner-of-war camp for the remainder of the war.

==== British anti-German sentiment ====
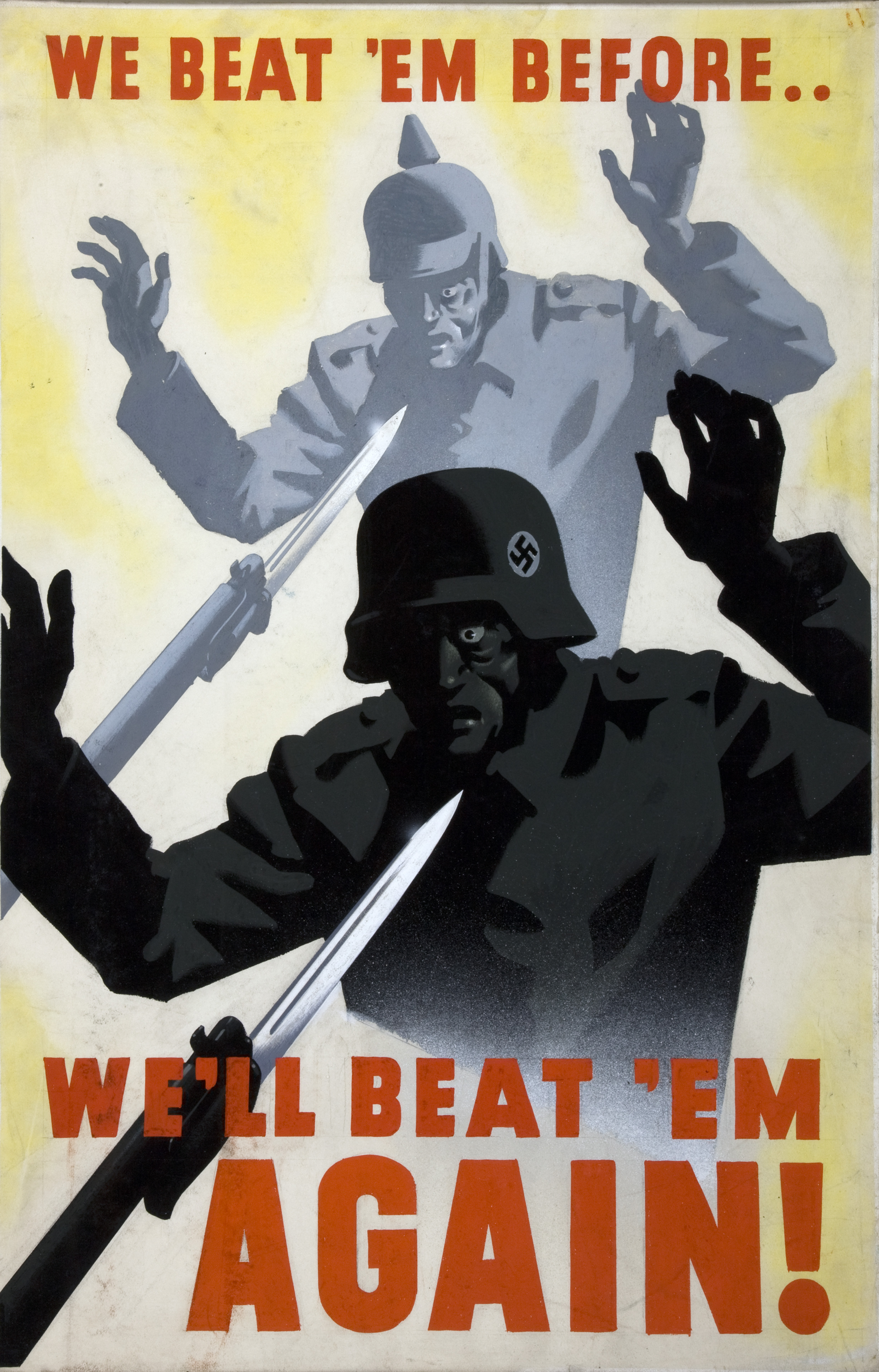
WWII poster

In 1940, the U.K. Ministry of Information launched an "Anger Campaign" to instill "personal anger ... against the German people and Germany", because the British were "harbouring little sense of real personal animus against the average German". This was done to strengthen British resolve against the Germans. Sir Robert Vansittart, the Foreign Office's chief diplomatic advisor until 1941, gave a series of radio broadcasts in which he said that Germany was a nation raised on "envy, self-pity and cruelty" whose historical development had "prepared the ground for Nazism" and that it was Nazism that had "finally given expression to the blackness of the German soul".

The British Institute of Public Opinion (BIPO) tracked the development of anti-German/anti-Nazi feeling in Britain, asking the public, via a series of opinion polls conducted from 1939 to 1943, whether "the chief enemy of Britain was the German people or the Nazi government". In 1939, only 6% of respondents held the German people responsible, but following the Blitz of 1940 to 1941 and the "Anger Campaign" in 1940, this increased to 50%. The figure subsequently declined to 41% by 1943. Home Intelligence reported in 1942 that there was some criticism of the official attitude of hatred towards Germany on the grounds that such hatred might hinder the possibility of a reasonable settlement following the war.

J.R.R. Tolkien expressed a measured attitude: in 1944 he wrote in a letter to his son Christopher:

[I]t is distressing to see the press grovelling in the gutter as low as Goebbels in his prime, shrieking that any German commander who holds out in a desperate situation (when, too, the military needs of his side clearly benefit) is a drunkard, and a besotted fanatic. ... There was a solemn article in the local paper seriously advocating systematic exterminating of the entire German nation as the only proper course after military victory: because, if you please, they are rattlesnakes, and don't know the difference between good and evil! (What of the writer?) The Germans have just as much right to declare the Poles and Jews exterminable vermin, subhuman, as we have to select the Germans: in other words, no right, whatever they have done.

In the same year Mass Observation asked its observers to analyse the British people's private opinions of the German people: it found that 54% of the British population was "pro-German", in that it expressed sympathy for the German people and stated that the war was "not their fault". This tolerance of the German people (as opposed to the Nazi régime) increased as the war progressed. In 1943, Mass Observation established that up to 60% of the British people maintained a distinction between Germans and Nazis, with only 20% or so expressing any "hatred, vindictiveness, or need for retribution". British film-propaganda of the period similarly maintained the distinction between Nazi supporters and the German people.

=== Post-World War II ===
American General George S. Patton complained that the US policy of denazification following Germany's surrender harmed American interests and was motivated simply by hatred of the defeated German people. Even the speed of West German recovery following the war was seen as ominous by some, who suspected the Germans of planning for World War III. In reality, most Nazi criminals were unpunished, such as Heinz Reinefarth, who was responsible for the Wola massacre. Many Nazis, such as Wernher von Braun and Reinhard Gehlen, worked for the Americans as scientists or intelligence officers. During the Allied occupation of Germany, Germans were used as forced laborers. Some of the laborers, depending on the country occupying, were prisoners of war or ethnic German civilians. Additionally, German POWs in Norway were forced to clear their own minefields and then walk over them, leading to the death and mutilation of hundreds of prisoners.

==== Flight and expulsion of Germans ====
After WWII ended, about 11 million to 12 million Germans fled, were expelled from Germany's former eastern provinces, or migrated from other countries to what remained of Germany, the largest transfer of a single European population in modern history. Estimates of the total number of dead range from 500,000 to 2,000,000, and the higher figures include "unsolved cases" of persons reported missing and presumed dead. Many German civilians were sent to internment and labor camps, where they died. Salomon Morel and Czesław Gęborski were the commanders of several camps for Germans, Poles and Ukrainians. The German-Czech Historians Commission, on the other hand, established a death toll for Czechoslovakia of 15,000–30,000. The events are usually classified as population transfer, or ethnic cleansing. Felix Ermacora was one of a minority of legal scholars to equate ethnic cleansing with genocide, and stated that the expulsion of the Sudeten Germans was therefore genocide.

===== Massacres in Czechoslovakia =====
A few days after the end of World War II, 2,000 Germans were massacred in Postoloprty and Žatec by the Czechoslovak army. In the summer of 1945, there were a number of incidents and localized massacres of the German population.

The following examples are described in a study done by the European University Institute in Florence. In the Přerov incident, 71 men, 120 women, and 74 children were killed, and on 30 May 1945, 30,000 Germans were forced to leave their homes in Brno for labour camps near Austria. It is estimated that several hundred died in the march.Estimates of killed in the Ústí massacre range from 30 to 700 civilians. Some women and children were thrown off the bridge into the Elbe River and shot.

Law No. 115 of 1946 (see Beneš decrees) provides: "Any act committed between September 30, 1938, and October 28, 1945, the object of which was to aid the struggle for liberty of the Czechs and Slovaks or which represented just reprisals for actions of the occupation forces and their accomplices, is not illegal, even when such acts may otherwise be punishable by law." As a consequence, atrocities committed during the expulsion of Germans were made legal.

== By country ==
=== Australia ===
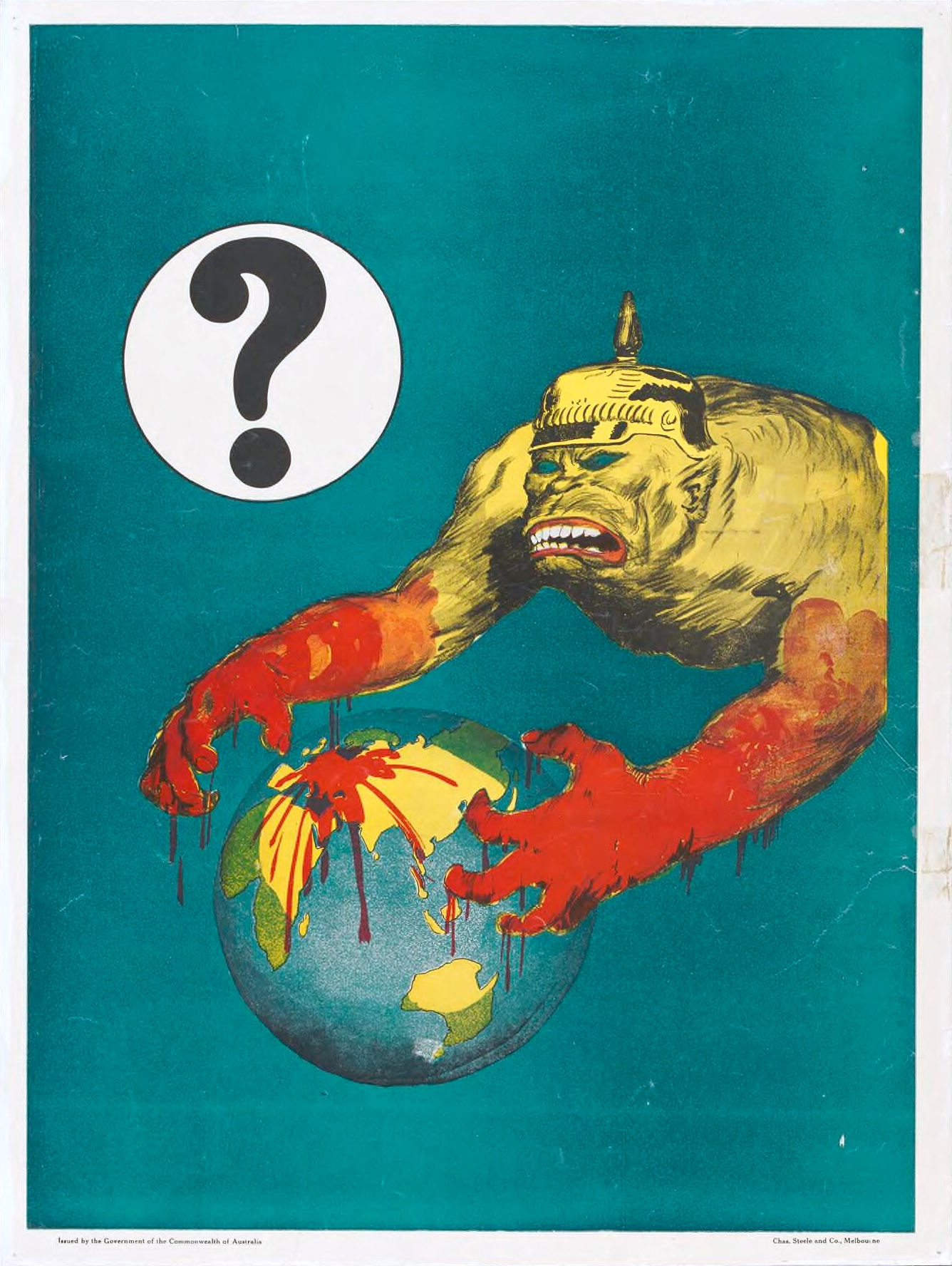
Australian Anti-German propaganda cartoon by Norman Lindsay, c. 1914–1918

When Britain declared war on Germany in 1914, naturalized Australian subjects born in enemy countries and Australian-born descendants of migrants born in enemy countries were declared "enemy aliens". Approximately 4,500 "enemy aliens" of German or Austro-Hungarian descent were interned in Australia during the war.

An official proclamation of 10 August 1914 required all German citizens to register their domiciles at the nearest police station and to notify authorities of any change of address. Under the later Aliens Restriction Order of 27 May 1915, enemy aliens who had not been interned had to report to the police once a week and could only change address with official permission. An amendment to the Restriction Order in July 1915 prohibited enemy aliens and naturalized subjects from changing their name or the name of any business they ran. Under the War Precautions Act of 1914 (which survived the First World War), publication of German language material was prohibited and schools attached to Lutheran churches were forced to abandon German as the language of teaching or were closed by the authorities. German clubs and associations were also closed.

Most of the anti-German feeling was created by the press that tried to create the idea that all those of German birth or descent supported Germany uncritically. This is despite many Germans and offspring such as Gen. John Monash serving Australia capably and honorably. A booklet circulated widely in 1915 claimed that "there were over 3,000 German spies scattered throughout the states". Anti-German propaganda was also inspired by several local and foreign companies who were keen to take the opportunity to eliminate Germany as a competitor in the Australian market. Germans in Australia were increasingly portrayed as evil by the very nature of their origins.

=== Canada ===
There was some anti-German sentiment in Germanic communities in Canada, including Berlin in Waterloo County, before the First World War and some cultural sanctions. There were anti-German riots in Victoria and Calgary in the first years of the war. Internment camps across Canada opened in 1915 and 8,579 "enemy aliens" were held there until the end of the war; many were German-speaking immigrants from Austria-Hungary, Germany, and Ukraine. Only 3,138 were classed as prisoners of war; the rest were civilians. Some German immigrants who lacked citizenship were detained in internment camps during the War, despite considering themselves Canadians. In fact, by 1919 most of the population of Kitchener, Waterloo, and Elmira in Waterloo County were Canadian. The German-speaking Amish and Mennonites were Christian pacifists, so they could not enlist, and the few who had immigrated from Germany could not morally fight against a country that was a significant part of their heritage.

News reports during the war years indicate that "a Lutheran minister was pulled out of his house ... he was dragged through the streets. German clubs were ransacked through the course of the war. It was just a really nasty time period." The bust of Kaiser Wilhelm II was stolen from Victoria Park and dumped into a lake, and soldiers vandalized German stores. A document in the Archives of Canada makes the following comment: "Although ludicrous to modern eyes, the whole issue of a name for Berlin highlights the effects that fear, hatred and nationalism can have upon a society in the face of war." History professor Mark Humphries summarized the situation:

Before the war, most people in Ontario probably didn't give the German community a second thought. But it's important to remember that Canada was a society in transition – the country had absorbed massive numbers of immigrants between 1896 and the First World War, proportionately more than at any other time in our history. So there were these latent fears about foreigners ... It becomes very easy to stoke these racist, nativist fires and convince people there really is a threat. War propaganda is top-down driven, but it's effective because it re-enforces tendencies that already exist.

— John Allemang, 2016

=== Israel ===
Anti-German sentiment in Israel has been very strong since the state's foundation in 1948, and for this reason the Israeli government refrained from establishing diplomatic relations with West Germany until 1965. In addition, strong political protest erupted each time any cooperation with the West German government took place, especially during the negotiations of the reparation agreement for the holocaust in 1951-1952 and following the establishment of diplomatic relations. These sentiments in Israeli society gradually subsided, but did not disappear completely.

In March 2008, German Chancellor Angela Merkel became the first foreign head of government invited to deliver a speech in the Israeli parliament, which she gave in German. Several members of parliament left in protest during the speech and claimed the need to create a collective memory of the Holocaust upon hearing the German language. In an October 2008 interview, the researcher Hanan Bar (Hebrew: חנן בר) summed up the ambiguous Israeli attitude to Germany: "If the average Israeli happens to see a football match between Germany and Holland, he would automatically root for the Dutch. But the same person, when buying a washing machine, would prefer a German model, considering it to be the best."

On April 14, 2026, German Chancellor Friedrich Merz issued the following message on X (formerly Twitter): "I made it clear: There must be no de facto annexation of the West Bank". In response, Bezalel Smotrich, an Israeli far-right politician and Minister with the Ministry of Defense, stated on X that the time when Germans dictated where Jews could live was over, stating, "You will not force us into ghettos again, certainly not in our own land". The remarks sparked controversy, with critics arguing that he unfairly incited hostility toward his ally Germany by using the tragedy of the Holocaust as a diplomatic shield; Ron Prosor, an Israeli Ambassador to Germany criticized Smotrich's comments, pointing out that relations between Israel and Germany are still strong amid a wave of criticism and hostility from the rest of Europe.

=== Russia / Soviet Union ===
In the mid-1850s and 1860s, Russia experienced an outbreak of Germanophobia after Austria refused to support it during the Crimean War. It was restricted mainly to a small group of writers in St. Petersburg that united around a left-wing newspaper. In 1864, it began with the publication of an article by a writer (using the pseudonym "Shedoferotti") who proposed that Poland be given autonomy and that the privileges of the Baltic German nobility in the Baltic governorates and Finland be preserved. Mikhail Katkov published a harsh criticism of the article in the Moscow News, which in turn caused a flood of angry articles in which Russian writers expressed their irritation with Europeans in which some featured direct attacks on Germans.

The following year, the 100th anniversary of the death of Mikhail Lomonosov was marked throughout the Russian Empire by articles being published that mentioned the difficulties that Lomonosov had encountered from the foreign members of the Russian Academy of Sciences, most of whom were of German descent. The authors then criticized contemporary German scholars for their neglect of the Russian language and for printing articles in foreign languages while they received funds from the Russian people. It was further suggested by some writers that Russian citizens of German origin who did not speak Russian and follow the Orthodox faith should be considered foreigners. It was also proposed that people of German descent be forbidden from holding diplomatic posts, as they might not have "solidarity with respect to Russia". Despite the press campaign against Germans, Germanophobic feelings did not develop in Russia to any widespread extent and died out because of the Imperial family's German roots and the presence of many German names in the Russian political elite.

=== United States ===
In the Pennsylvania Colony The Palatines, were German-speaking Protestants from the Palatinate region of present-day Germany. They arrived in Pennsylvania seeking religious freedom and economic opportunities in the early and mid-18th century. They are commonly referred to as the Pennsylvania Dutch (the term "Dutch" refers to the German word for the German language and has nothing to do with Holland.) The sentiments against them were rooted in politics. Urban Quakers formed a political coalition with Pennsylvania Dutch farmers in opposition to the Scots-Irish farmers. The latter viewed the Palatines with suspicion and often derided their language, customs, and religious practices.

==== Post-independence ====
A key event where Pennsylvania Dutch faced hardships was during Fries's Rebellion. The participants in the rebellion were primarily German-speaking farmers, many of whom were recent immigrants or descendants of German immigrants. Their cultural and linguistic differences may have contributed to perceptions of them as outsiders by some in the broader American society. The rebellion was primarily a response to the federal government's enforcement of a new direct tax, commonly known as the Direct Tax of 1798 or the House Tax. President John Adams granted pardons to Fries and several others who had been convicted of treason. Adams was motivated by the more specific constitutional interpretation of treason. He later remarked that the rebels were "obscure, miserable Germans, as unfamiliar with our language as they were with our laws," and suggested that they were being manipulated by prominent figures in the opposing political party.

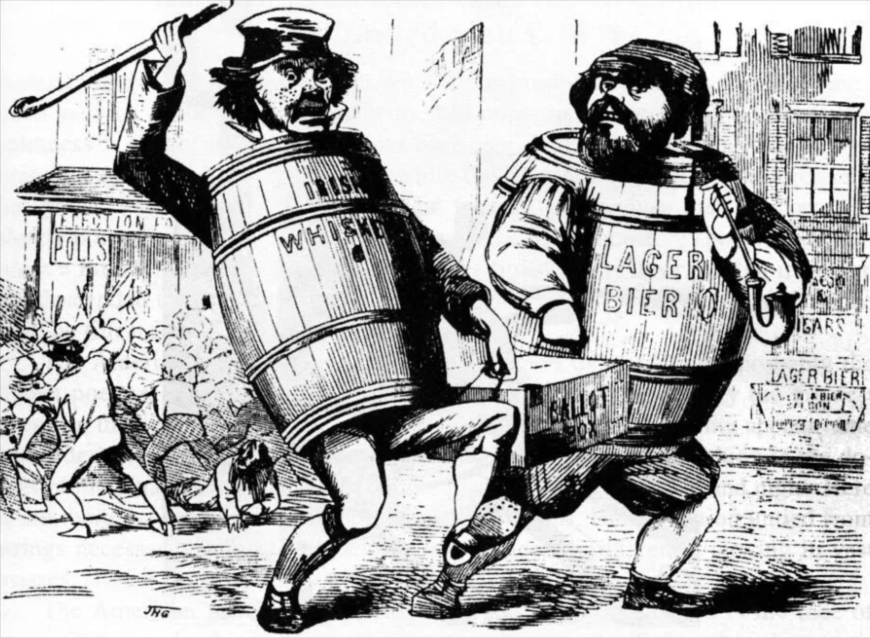
1850s political cartoon by John H. Goater depicting Irish and German caricatures 'stealing an election' with chaos at the 'Election Day Polls', fueling fears of immigrant political power.

In the 19th century, the mass influx of German immigrants made them one of the largest European group of Americans by ancestry. This wave of migration triggered the formation of nativist and reactionary movements which were similar to those movements which exist in the contemporary Western world. These would eventually culminate in 1844 with the establishment of the American Party, which had an openly xenophobic stance. One of many incidents described in a 19th-century account included the blocking of a funeral procession in New York by a group who proceeded to hurl insults at the pallbearers. Incidents such as these led to more meetings of Germans who would eventually form fraternal groups such as the Sons of Hermann in 1840, which was founded as a means to "improve and foster German customs and the spread of benevolence among Germans in the United States".

== Contemporary Europe ==
Results of 2017 BBC World Service poll Views of Germany's influence by country (sorted by net positive, Pos – Neg)
Country polled	Pos.	Neg.	Neutral	Pos – Neg
Greece	29%	50%	21%	-21
Turkey	45%	36%	19%	9
Pakistan	21%	20%	59%	1
Russia	31%	29%	40%	2
Peru	45%	28%	27%	17
India	40%	17%	43%	23
Indonesia	48%	20%	32%	28
Mexico	54%	25%	21%	29
Spain	56%	26%	18%	30
Kenya	64%	19%	17%	45
Brazil	63%	18%	19%	45
United States	70%	17%	13%	53
Nigeria	71%	16%	13%	55
Canada	73%	15%	12%	58
France	79%	17%	4%	62
Australia	79%	10%	11%	69
United Kingdom	84%	14%	2%	70
China	84%	13%	3%	71

Results of 2014 BBC World Service poll Views of Germany's influence by country (Note: The annual survey was inaugurated in 2005. For Germany's influence, the 2014 results (see table) cover only 22 countries, excluding Argentina. The report, including pages cited here, sometimes shifts focus to 21 or 20 countries that were covered as participants both in 2013 and 2014.) (sorted by net positive, Pos – Neg)
Country surveyed	Pos.	Neg.	Neutral	Pos – Neg
Israel	25%	38%	37%	-13
Spain	44%	40%	16%	4
India	32%	26%	42%	6
Pakistan	35%	27%	38%	8
China	42%	22%	36%	20
Mexico	45%	24%	31%	21
Peru	44%	22%	34%	22
Turkey	47%	24%	29%	23
Indonesia	53%	28%	19%	25
Chile	47%	18%	35%	29
Nigeria	63%	23%	14%	40
Japan	46%	3%	51%	43
Kenya	58%	15%	27%	43
Russia	57%	12%	31%	45
Brazil	66%	21%	13%	45
Germany	68%	19%	13%	49
Ghana	72%	13%	15%	59
United States	73%	13%	14%	60
Canada	77%	10%	13%	67
France	83%	11%	6%	72
United Kingdom	86%	9%	5%	77
South Korea	84%	6%	10%	78
Australia	86%	7%	7%	79

After the separation into two countries after World War II, West Germany generally had good relationships with its western neighboring states (such as France and the Netherlands), and East Germany to some degree had similar relationships with its eastern neighbors (such as Poland). Many of the relationships continued after the end of the Cold War with the unified Germany. West Germany was a cofounder of the European Union and the reunified Germany continues as a leading member. During the process of European unification, Germany and France forged a strong relationship, ending the longstanding French–German enmity, which had peaked during and after World War I. Much of today's anti-German sentiment is particularly strong in East European countries occupied by Germany during the war and those that were at war with Germany and the other European Axis powers.

Although views fluctuate somewhat in response to geopolitical issues such as Berlin's refusal to support the invasion of Iraq, Washington regards modern Germany as an ally. Few Americans are strongly anti-German. Occasionally, Germans are stereotyped as being "ruthlessly efficient" and having no sense of humour in some parts of American media, as well as in the UK and other countries. Richard Wagner's music was not performed in Israel until 1995 (radio) and 2001 (concert) and was for many years unpopular in Poland. That can be explained at least partially by Wagner's anti-Semitism and the Nazi appropriation of Wagner's music based on Hitler's personal affection for his operas.

In a poll carried out in 2008 for the BBC World Service in which people in 34 countries were asked about the positive and negative influence of 13 countries, (Note: For 2008, the fourth annual Country Ratings Poll surveyed opinion concerning the "influence" of the European Union and 13 countries: Brazil, Britain, China, France, Germany, India, Iran, Israel, Japan, North Korea, Pakistan, Russia, and the U.S. For 2014, the tenth annual poll covered the influence of the E.U. and 16 countries, the same 13 plus Canada, South Africa, and South Korea. All of the influential countries except Iran, North Korea, and South Africa were among the 24 surveyed.) Germany was the most popular, ahead of Japan, France and Britain; only 18 percent across all countries surveyed thought Germany had a mainly negative influence. Mainly negative views were most widespread in Turkey (47 percent) and Egypt (43 percent).

In 2014, the BBC World Service published the "Country Rating Poll", which included surveyed opinion from 24 participating countries concerning the influence of 16 countries and the European Union; 12 of the influential countries participated. Results were released at the end of May. The table shows the "Views of Germany's Influence" overall (line 1) and by country. "Germany has kept its position of the most favourably viewed nation in 2014." That is, Germany is the one whose influence is most commonly (60%) viewed positively; among the 17 Germany stands second to Canada as the ones least commonly (18%) viewed negatively. In the first ten polls, annual from 2005, Germany had been the country with world influence most commonly viewed positively at least in 2008 as well as 2013 and 2014. An updated "Country Rating Poll" was published in 2017 by the BBC. Germany was the second-most positively-viewed country in the 2017 edition, with 59 percent of respondents in the survey viewing Germany favourably and approximately 20 percent of respondents having negative opinions about the country.

A survey took place in the summer of 2017 among ten members of the EU. Most expressed scepticism about German influence on European matters; the Greeks (89%) express most of the skepticism followed by the Italians (69%) and the Spanish (68%). Greeks also come with the most negative opinion (84%) about Angela Merkel, and with the least positive opinion about the German people (24%), among the questioned ten states.

=== European debt crisis ===
During the European debt crisis, Germany was frequently portrayed as the driving force behind austerity measures enforced on eurozone countries such as Greece, Italy, Spain, and Portugal. Critics accused Germany of benefiting disproportionately from the crisis by promoting internal deflation, compelling weaker economies to adopt wage reductions and fiscal retrenchment to safeguard its own export competitiveness.

Contemporary commentary described Germany's role as resembling a "scapegoat" for the crisis, with some European leaders and media blaming Berlin for rigid financial and fiscal directives imposed across the eurozone. These critiques depicted Germany as wielding excessive influence over EU financial governance and burdening softer economies with policies that favored its own economic model. German officials and economists countered these claims by citing structural weaknesses and fiscal indiscipline in peripheral countries as key contributors to the crisis, arguing that Germany was unjustly blamed for a broader systemic failure across the eurozone.

=== Greece ===
The Greek government-debt crisis and EU-driven austerity measures imposed on the country revived anti-German sentiments. The Greek media was making comments critical of the German policy, often mentioning, and drawing parallels with the Axis occupation of Greece, with some commentators emphasizing a genetic heritage from "Goths" or "Huns". A poll in 2012 by VPRC noted the existence of an anti-German sentiment in Greece, and that the majority of the respondents connected Germany with negative notions such as "Hitler", "Nazism" and "3rd Reich".

A main argument has been that, despite its rhetoric, Germany made profits during the Greek debt crisis (due to falling borrowing rates – as Germany, along with other strong Western economies, was seen as a safe haven by investors during the crisis – investment influx, and exports boost due to the Euro's depreciation, with estimates reaching 100bn Euros, as well as other profits through loans). Another key issue has been the claim for still-owed war reparations, with estimates reaching 279b Euros.

=== Italy ===
In August 2012, Italian Prime Minister Mario Monti warned that escalating arguments over how to resolve the Euro debt crisis are turning countries against each other and threatening to rip Europe apart. Resentment in Italy is growing against Germany, the European Union and Chancellor Merkel, he said, adding that "the pressures already bear the traits of a psychological break-up of Europe".

=== Netherlands ===
Anti-German sentiment was already prevalent in the Netherlands centuries before the unification of Germany and establishment of imperial Germany, completed 1871. The Dutch are thought to have developed a low opinion of Germans during the first half of the 17th century, when the Republic saw a major spike in German immigrants including common laborers (so-called hannekemaaiers), persecuted Lutherans and Jews, and all sorts of war refugees fleeing the violence of the Thirty Years' War. A culture clash soon followed. It was likely around this time that the earliest variations of the word mof were first used to refer to German migrants. There are known joke books in which these Germans are featured prominently and stereotypically as arrogant and filthy. Anti-German sentiment waned during the Second Boer War, as both countries were known supporters of the Boers, and allowed their citizens to volunteer to fight alongside them. During World War I (in which the Netherlands was neutral), the so-called Wire of Death, a lethal 2000 volts electric fence built along the southern Dutch border by German-occupied Belgium caused a large number of fatalities among the Dutch people, renewing anti-German sentiment in the Netherlands. This sentiment was reborn as hatred when, in 1940, Nazi Germany launched its invasion of the Netherlands despite earlier promises from Germany to respect Dutch neutrality. More than 100,000 Dutch Jews were deported to their deaths during the subsequent Nazi occupation, and starvation afflicted much of the country during the "Hunger Winter" of 1944–45. Most elderly Dutch people remember these events including the Rotterdam Blitz bitterly, and some still refuse to set foot on German soil.

A sociological study from 1998 showed that still two generations after it had ended, World War II remained influential, and "present-day parents and young people are negatively biased against Germany." Aspeslagh and Dekker reported in 1998 that "more than half of the cohort born after 1950 answered 'sometimes' or 'often' when asked whether they harbored anti-German feelings". Reviewing three large-scale academic studies from the 1990s, they concluded:

The emotional feelings regarding Germany and Germans revealed by these studies are defined by the Second World War. The annual commemorations of World War II, the way history lessons deal with Germany and the continual, casually negative remarks by adults reproduce the negative emotions about Germany and Germans, particularly among the young.

Newer studies also consistently show that Dutch anti-German sentiment has been falling steadily for years, and that most Dutch people today show a positive view towards both Germany and the German people.

=== Poland ===
Many Poles perceive Germans as their long-time oppressors. This notion is based on a long history of conflict with ethnic Poles, first by the German-language and culture Prussians then by the united German state, starting with three partitions of Poland, Germanization in the 19th and 20th centuries, and culminating in the Nazi Germany's invasion of Poland in 1939 and the brutal occupation that followed.

Several issues have also strained recent Polish-German relations, although Poland and post-reunification Germany overall have had mostly positive relations. The proposed Russo-German pipeline through the Baltic Sea is seen by Poles as aimed at cutting off Poland's natural gas supplies from Russia without damaging supply to Germany, and was even compared to the ignominious Molotov–Ribbentrop pact by Radosław Sikorski, Polish foreign minister.

Polish elections have repeatedly featured anti-German campaigns by the Law and Justice party, which is considered to use anti-German rhetoric as an effective tactic for winning votes.

=== Switzerland ===
Rapid increase of German immigration to Switzerland since 2000 has given rise to "Germanophobia" in German-speaking Switzerland. The extent of and reasons for Swiss opposition to German immigration were studied in Helbling (2009–11), based on a survey from 1994 to 1995 of 1,300 Swiss (of which some 940 responded) from the city of Zürich, the main target of German immigration at the time. The survey found that, in 1994–95, the Germans were the fourth-most disliked immigrant group in Zürich (disliked by almost each 9th). Following – with a distance – the immigrants from Turkey (disliked by each 3rd to 4th), the Arab World (disliked by each 3rd) and Former Yugoslavia (considered as a single group, disliked by each 2nd). And disliked slightly more than the Tamils (disliked by each 10th) and Black Africans (disliked by each narrowly under each 10th of the 940 respondents).

=== United Kingdom ===
"Ten German Bombers" continues to be sung by England fans (recorded here in 2013, 68 years after the end of WWII).

Anti-German sentiment is a common theme in football culture among supporters of the England national football team. In fan gatherings around football matches between England and Germany, England fans will often sing anti-German football chants which associate football rivalry between England and Germany with historic military conflicts between the United Kingdom and the German Reich; "Two World Wars and One World Cup" links the military defeats of Germany in 1918 and 1945 with the defeat of West Germany in the 1966 FIFA World Cup, while "Ten German Bombers" makes reference to World War II Luftwaffe operations during the Battle of Britain. "Ten German Bombers" is now considered offensive and UEFA and the Football Association (FA) have banned England fans from singing the song. In recent times, much of the anti-German sentiment in football is exclusively within the England fanbase, as both the Wales and Scotland national teams' fans have rarely exhibited any negative behaviour or chants during their meetings with the German team.

Postwar Era reconciliation was followed by the beginning of the Cold War, which led to Great Britain and West Germany both joining the NATO military alliance against the Warsaw Pact. The BBC Television sitcom, Fawlty Towers 1975 episode "The Germans" satirized British obsession with World War II through Basil Fawlty's infamous line, "Don't mention the war!". Basil's panicked and offensive behaviour highlighted outdated British attitudes, with series co-creator John Cleese aiming to mock those clinging to the past rather than criticize Germans.

Similarly to Basil Fawlty, the modern British press sometimes expresses anti-German sentiments and frequently makes references to World War II and stereotypical associations equating the modern Federal Republic of Germany with Nazi Germany. These headlines are frequently coupled with Eurosceptic views, express concerns about German domination over the rest of the European Union, most particularly in publications which favour Brexit. According to a 2008 poll, the British people have a rather positive image of Germany, with 62 percent believing that Germany has a mainly positive influence in the world and only 20 percent believing that Germany's influence is mainly negative, slightly better than Germans' views of Britain (60 percent and 27 percent, respectively).

== See also ==
- Anti-Europeanism
- Anti-Austrian sentiment
- Anti-Germans (political current)
- Ethnocentrism
- German Americans
- German diaspora
- Germanophilia
- History of Austria
- History of Germany
- Internment of German Americans
- List of terms used for Germans
- Nativism in United States politics
- Stereotypes of Germans
- The Riddle of the Sands
- Xenophobia in the United States
