= If You're Happy and You Know It =

Children's song

The melody of the song (with different lyrics) in an advertisement for the Singaporean e-commerce company Shopee.

"If You're Happy and You Know It" is a popular traditional American repetitive children's song, folksong, and drinking song.

== History ==
The song was published in various places through the decades following the late 1960s, including a volume of "constructive recreational activities" for children (1957), a book of drama projects for disabled children (1967), and a nursing home manual (1966).

In 1971, Jonico Music filed for copyright on the song, crediting it to Joe Raposo.

During the early part of the 2000s, the music Recording Industry Association of America sued individuals for downloading music using file-sharing services. Widespread media attention was paid to one 12-year-old, whose downloads included "If You're Happy and You Know It" from Kazaa.

In 2020, Granger Smith recorded a version that relied on alcohol drinking called "Country and Ya Know It".

== Lyric variations ==
Like many children's songs, there are many versions of the lyrics. A popular version goes as follows:

If you're happy and you know it, clap your hands!
If you're happy and you know it, clap your hands!
If you're happy and you know it, and you really want to show it;
If you're happy and you know it, clap your hands!

This verse is usually followed by more which follow the same pattern but say: "If you're happy and you know it, stomp/stamp your feet!", "If you're happy and you know it, shout/say 'hooray'!" or "shout/say 'amen'!", "If you're happy and you know it, do all three!", "If you're happy and you know it, do all four!". Other versions of the song tend to say, "then your face will surely show it" in place of "and you really want to show it"; the form "then you really ought to show it" has also been used. Many variations on the substance of the first three verses exist, including:

"... stomp/stamp your feet."
"... wave your arms."
"... say/shout, "hooray!", "amen!""
"... do all three, four, five, etc..

== Melody ==
In the Japanese version as popularized by Kyu Sakamoto and included as the 11th track of Kyu Sakamoto Memorial Best, the third line has a different melody to fit the Japanese lyrics.
