= Atticus (band) =

American rock band formed in 1995

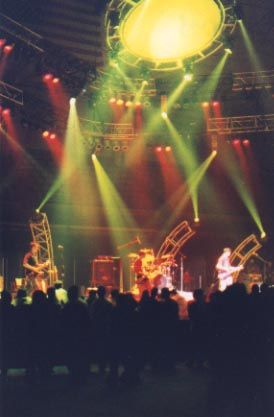
- Atticus live at the Knoxville Civic Coliseum

Background information
- Origin: Knoxville, Tennessee
- Genres: Progressive rock, power pop, alternative rock
- Years active: 1995–present
- Labels: Goldacre & Horner
- Members: Donnie Shockley; Aaron Gabriel; Allen Clark
- Past members: Nick Swan; Jon Rumbolt; Adam Menhinick; Jeev Raghow; Jamaal Kirkpatrick

Atticus is an American rock band formed in 1995 in Knoxville, Tennessee, noted for progressive compositions, complex harmonies, innovative cover art, and a small but loyally devoted fan base. The band is named after the Atticus Finch character of To Kill a Mockingbird, a novel by Harper Lee which won the Pulitzer Prize for Fiction in 1961, and commonly picturized in posters and T-shirts developed by various print companies and Express clothing line. Atticus reunited with former Atticus guitarist Nick Swan for a special reunion show at the New City Cafe in Knoxville's Old City on July 16, 2005. The band officially went on indefinite hiatus on June 7, 2006 to pursue other artistic endeavors, though several side projects are underway.

== History ==
Atticus began as a grunge style garage band formed by Aaron Gabriel, Donnie Shockley, and Allen Clark just before they graduated junior high school. Nick Swan and Adam Menhinick joined the group a few years later, completing the lineup. The very first Atticus album was self-titled and actually the third or fourth attempt the band had made to record a CD on a portable Fostex four-track recorder. Allen's family was in the process of moving from their already nice home to an even nicer mansion, and the band had the perfect opportunity and space to record an album in the Clarks' abandoned former residency. Atticus began tracking songs and made significant progress on what would have been their first album until something happened. They don't remember what happened, but something definitely happened that caused them to abandon the project. Then Nick received a new four-track recorder for his birthday that had some EQ knobs and gadgets that the little Fostex they'd been using didn't possess. Hastily recorded and produced at the end of the last century, Atticus was thrust into the hands of awaiting fans and music stores all over Knoxville and then quickly confiscated. The limited number of copies in existence makes Atticus a collector's item, noted for its distinctly atrocious production and sound quality. This album is considered to be very important to the development of Atticus because it got them accustomed to the recording process and largely determined what songs would later be found on High Expectations.

After several years of polishing a repertoire of original songs and attempting several demo recordings, Atticus decided that the time had come to professionally record a collection of their songs for release by Goldacre & Horner. They entered the studio in December 1999 and recorded twelve of the thirteen songs – the thirteenth having already been recorded earlier that year at Tony Verdera's home studio in Knoxville – for their full-length debut, High Expectations, released on February 12, 2000. Atticus presents their adroit ability on this very guitar-driven CD to perform a variety of styles of rock while maintaining an identifiably signature sound – from southern-fried blues-rock stomp to placid, wistful love ballads. So innovative, in fact, was their debut release that Atticus received Rik's Music's prestigious "No Cheese" award in September 2000.

In December 2000, Nick and Adam left Atticus, leaving Donnie and Aaron as the only ones who wanted to keep the band alive (Allen also wanted to continue, but he was on a mission trip in Mexico at the time). Donnie tried forming a new group with several different musicians over the following months, but it was clear that nothing was working out quite right. There was just no combination of people who could create that same great Atticus sound as the original lineup. Donnie was at the point of giving up altogether when he finally realized the obvious solution: record an Atticus album with the three members who formed the group in 1995 – Allen Clark, Aaron Gabriel, and himself. In April 2001, the original Atticus returned to Dwell Studios.Eight months later, Figment was born. Figment was a mostly acoustic album that included Pachelbel's Kanon in D performed by Aaron on the violin. 99 Bottles of Beer on the Wall, recorded at the Glasgow Cathouse in Scotland, was named the top drinking song/booze ballad of all time by Modern Drunkard Magazine for what Rich Stewart aka Homebrew Stew of the now defunct Craphouse Press called "a raucous, thirteen minute party-jam ," beating out the likes of Ozzy Osbourne, The Rolling Stones, Johnny Cash, and Willie Nelson, just to name a few. Stewart also placed Atticus' version of the song at #1 in his book entitled The Top 151 Drinking Songs.

Selections From The Vault was a concurrently self-released EP of Atticus rarities arranged while putting the finishing touches on Grand Theft Audio. In addition to the original, widely-downloaded version of Romance Is A Slowdance, the first three studio recordings Atticus ever did, c. 1996 – Stardust, Pipe Dreams, and Pathetic – were included as well. The disc also included an extremely rare, extremely unusual instrumental track that was recorded around the same time entitled Let Go of My Shoe, You Nasty Dog! Most noteworthy however was the inclusion of Think I'm Gonna Kill Myself, the Atticus radio single under the pseudonym The Green Apple Splatters of the infamous "Green Apple Splatters Hoax."

The Atticus single Forever My Darling was performed nationwide on September 19, 2003 on the WB's The Daily Buzz, seen in a total of 140 markets, clearing over 41% of the country. Ron Corning, news anchor on the syndicated morning talk show, described the performance as "... an amazing song, I thought. [The song is] very much a Buddy Holly 1950s kind of sound." A studio version of that song is included on Grand Theft Audio, the latest album by Atticus which includes the Green Apple Splatters' Southeast Exports interview.

== Discography ==
Album title	Year
Atticus (self-titled)	1999
High Expectations	2000
Figment	2001
Selections From the Vault	2003
Grand Theft Audio	2005
