= Ten Green Bottles =

Children's song

Nursery rhyme
- Published: Unknown

"Ten Green Bottles" is a popular children's repetitive song that consists of a single verse of music that is repeated, with each verse decrementing by one the number of bottles on the wall. The song appears in The Oxford Song Book in 1928, where it is described as a "traditional North country song."

== Lyrics ==
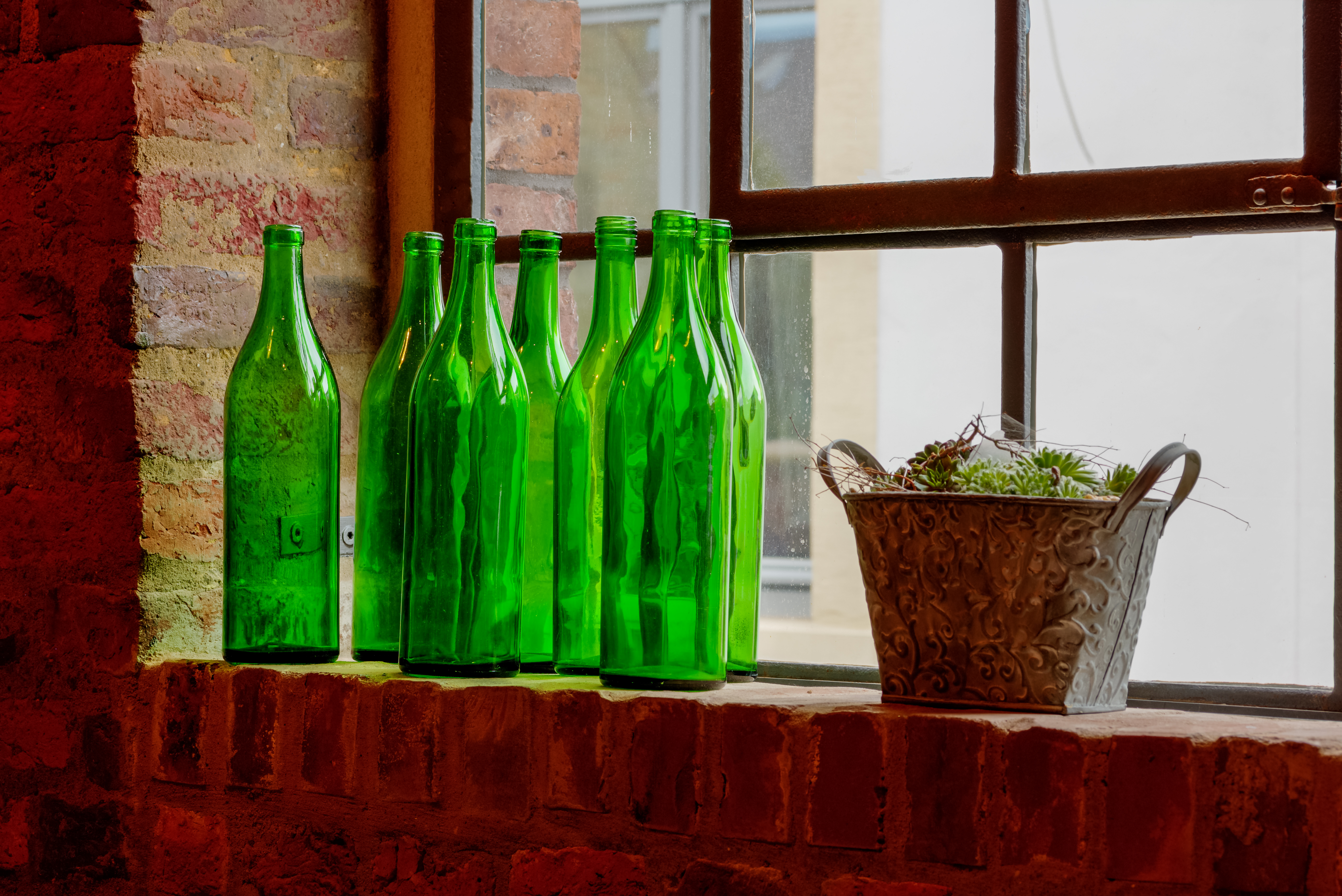
Green bottles on a window sill

Ten green bottles hanging on the wall,
Ten green bottles hanging on the wall,
And if one green bottle should accidentally fall,
There'll be nine green bottles hanging on the wall.

This pattern continues until the number of bottles reaches zero. The final verse ends "There'll be no green bottles hanging on the wall."

== Variant ==
Another children's song, "Ten Fat Sausages", follows the same structure, but with each verse decrementing by two the number of sausages in the pan.

Ten fat sausages sizzling in a pan
Ten fat sausages sizzling in a pan
One went ‘pop’ and the other went ‘bang’
Now there’s eight fat sausages sizzling in a pan.

== See also ==
- Repetitive song
- "99 Bottles of Beer"
- "Ten German Bombers"
- "Ten Little Injuns"
