= King Rat (band) =

Punk rock band from Denver, Colorado

- Origin: Denver, Colorado
- Genres: Punk rock
- Years active: 1994–present
- Labels: AMP Records, Fivecore Records, Unable Record, Hotshot Locksmith Records
- Members: Luke Schmaltz, Anthony DeLilli, Doug Hopper, Mike Makkay
- Past members: Mykel Martinez, Todd Daigle, Todd Schlueter, Tony Luk, Zeth Pedulla

King Rat is a punk rock band based in Denver, Colorado. The band was formed in 1994 by singer and guitarist Luke Schmaltz, and has remained active since, with Schmaltz acting as the band's frontman and chief songwriter. King Rat has released nine full-length studio albums, two EPs, and a "best of" live album, issued through various independent music labels. The band is regularly featured in Denver publications such as Hybrid Magazine and Westword.

== Discography ==
=== Studio albums ===
- No Apologies, No Regrets (2017)
- Buy The Ticket Take The Ride (2014)
- Everything Burns (2010)
- Duct Tape and Dreams (2007)
- Beautiful Songs for Ugly Children (2001)
- Big Plans (2000)
- Knockin' Up Heaven's Whore (1998)
- The Towne Liar (1995)

=== Singles and EPs ===
- Sacred Things (2012)
- King Rat (2001)

=== Live / "best of" albums ===
- 20 Years A Million Beers (2015)

=== Music videos ===
- "EMT - A Punk Rock Parable" (2016), directed by Kenneth Woodard

== Related projects ==
Schmaltz routinely performs as a solo singer/songwriter act, often playing acoustic versions of King Rat songs. Schmaltz is a staff writer and regular contributor to Modern Drunkard Magazine, and King Rat has performed at several of Modern Drunkard’s conventions in Denver and Las Vegas. Schmaltz is also the author of the novel The Belcher, as well as a sometime actor in independent films. He often gives interviews in which he discusses both King Rat's music and his personal life.
