= Ten German Bombers =

British schoolchildren's song

"Ten German Bombers" is a song with the tune of "She'll Be Coming 'Round the Mountain". It has been adopted as a football chant by English football fans, and is sung mainly at football matches during international competitions, namely the UEFA Euros and FIFA World Cup, especially in games against Germany. It has been criticised as discriminatory by both UEFA and the Football Association, with fans who chant it facing bans from competitions.

== Lyrics ==
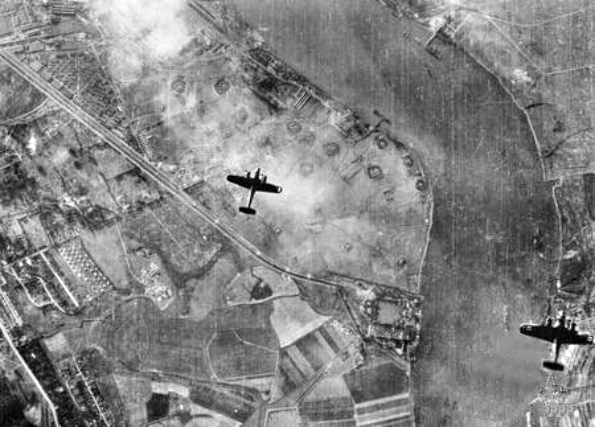
"Ten German Bombers" makes reference to Luftwaffe operations against Britain during World War II.

"Ten German Bombers" makes reference to German bombers and defensive action by the RAF during World War II. It is sung to tune of "She'll Be Coming 'Round the Mountain". It is a simple repetitive song and the verse pattern follows a cumulative song format, similar to "Ten Green Bottles":

There were ten German bombers in the air.
There were ten German bombers in the air.
There were ten German bombers, ten German bombers, ten German bombers in the air.
And the RAF from England shot one down.
And the RAF from England shot one down.
And the RAF from England, RAF from England, RAF from England shot one down.

There were nine German bombers in the air.
There were nine German bombers in the air.
There were nine German bombers, nine German bombers, nine German bombers in the air.
And the RAF from England shot one down.
And the RAF from England shot one down.
And the RAF from England, RAF from England, RAF from England shot one down.

...

These verses are then repeated with ten replaced by the appropriate number, with one fewer bomber in the air each time. The 10th verse becomes "There was one German bomber in the air" and "And the RAF from England shot it down". The last verse becomes "There were no German bombers in the air" and "’Cause the RAF from England shot them down".

== In football ==
"Ten German Bombers" sung by England fans (recorded in 2013).

Since the beginning of the 1990s, the song has been sung by English football fans at some matches against the Germany national football team. It is typically accompanied by horizontally outstretched arms and a gentle swaying motion, as if to mimic an aircraft in flight, and on some occasions, the word "air" has been replaced with "war".

The song has been deemed to be racially offensive by The Football Association (FA). In December 2005, Sven-Göran Eriksson, the then manager, asked fans to refrain from it at the 2006 FIFA World Cup in Germany, a plea echoed by Greater Manchester Police and other authorities. Television commercials starring David Beckham, Michael Owen, and Wayne Rooney requesting the same were also planned. Similar issues attended the football song "Two World Wars and One World Cup".

These moves were criticised by some elements of the British press. In December 2005, Tony Parsons, writing in The Daily Mirror, stated that:

"Less than a lifetime ago the Germans inflicted untold misery on the world. If English football fans choose to deal with that a mere 60 years later by holding their arms out and pretending to be Lancaster bombers, I would suggest that the Germans are getting off quite lightly."

German fans in 2006, exhilarated by their team's three previous victories in the World Cup, adopted rival songs. Supporters of the two teams engaged in impromptu chanting competitions in the centre of Cologne. Elsewhere the answer from German fans at football matches was often the Nazi song Bomben auf Engelland ("Bombs to England"). The well known and often varied chant "Without England we're heading to Berlin" ("Ohne England fahr'n wir nach Berlin") uses the melody of "Yellow Submarine".

During the 2006 World Cup, the German musician Torsun (half of the group Egotronic) recorded a techno cover of the song. The song and its accompanying YouTube video (featuring footage of German planes being shot down, the Wembley Goal, a burning German flag, etc.) attracted media attention in Germany, as well as from the British tabloid News of the World. The song was eventually included in the World Cup themed compilation Weltmeister Hits 2006.

The song is also sung by Northern Ireland fans at home matches at Windsor Park, and also at numerous away matches. This rendition replaces the lyric England with Ulster. It has become a regular chant since the start of the millennium and can heard being sung by the Green and White Army in The Kop. In November 2014, during the qualification game against Romania in Bucharest for UEFA Euro 2016, the crowd sang Ten German Bombers at the final whistle.

During the 2021 European Football Championship, both the UEFA and the FA decided that fans singing "Ten German Bombers" would be banned from the competition. The FA further condemned taking part in "discriminatory or disrespectful" chants. Fans nonetheless singing "Ten German Bombers" in front of Wembley Stadium were covered by the German and international media.

In the run up to the 2024 European Football Championship, amid concerns of violence in anticipation of England's inaugural game against Serbia, police in the city of Gelsenkirchen warned English fans away from singing the song. A more broad warning was issued against violence, riots, or defamatory chants, but specifically named the song. The warning stated that such behaviour would result in police intervention to establish whether a crime had occurred, and possible arrests.

== Alternatives ==
Northern Ireland supporters also sing the song replacing England with Ulster, and this song is usually followed by "The Dam Busters March". Fans of Rangers also regularly sing "Ten German Bombers", replacing the word "England" with "Britain".

Ukraine and England supporters sang the song with alternative lyrics during their March 2023 UEFA European Championship qualifying match at Wembley Stadium, in reference to the Russian invasion of Ukraine. Changes to the lyrics included "Russian bombers" being shot down by the "air force from Ukraine," with each verse ending with an appeal for Ukraine to be provided with General Dynamics F-16 Fighting Falcon aircraft.

== See also ==
- Association football culture
- Germany – United Kingdom relations
