= She'll Be Coming 'Round the Mountain =

American folk song

She'll Be Coming 'Round the Mountain

"She'll Be Coming 'Round the Mountain" (sometimes referred to as "Coming 'Round the Mountain") is a traditional folk song often categorized as children's music. The song is derived from the Christian spiritual known as "When the Chariot Comes". It has been assigned the number 4204 in the Roud Folk Song Index.

== Background ==
The first appearance of "She'll Be Comin' Round the Mountain" in print was in Carl Sandburg's The American Songbag in 1927. Sandburg reports that the Negro spiritual "When the Chariot Comes", which was sung to the same melody, was adapted by railroad workers in the Midwestern United States during the 1890s. It is often heard today with responses that add on to the previous verse.

The original song was published in Old Plantation Hymns in 1899. It ostensibly refers to the Second Coming of Christ and subsequent Rapture, with the she referring to the chariot that the returning Christ is depicted as driving.

The secularized version that developed among railroad work gangs in the late 19th century has become a standard over the years, appearing in printed collections of children's music while also being performed by both children and adults in sing-alongs, particularly as a campfire song. Since the mid-1920s, "She'll Be Comin' Round the Mountain" has been recorded by numerous musicians, ranging from Tommy Tucker and Bing Crosby to Pete Seeger and Neil Young.

== Variations ==
- The earliest known recordings of the song were by Henry Whitter on Okeh Records (OKeh 40063) in 1924 and Vernon Dalhart & Co. on Edison Records (Edison 51608) in 1925.
- In the Reader's Digest Children's Songbook, published in 1985, the song is adapted with new words by Dan Fox and his son, Paul. The lyrics tell of the things "she" will do in increasing number up to ten, for example, "She'll be ridin' on a camel", "She'll be tuggin' on two turtles", and "She'll be carvin' three thick thistles".
- Some sports fans at the University of Cambridge use this tune to sing "we would rather be at Oxford than St John's".
- Fans of the England national football team sing a football chant called Ten German Bombers at games against Germany by singing "There were ten German bombers in the air" or "And the RAF from England shot one down" depending on the line.
- The song formed the basis of the song “Shoot Shoot” by Filipino rapper Andrew E.

== See also ==
- List of train songs
