= Potje met vet =

Traditional song in the Dutch language

Single by Hydra
- Language: Dutch
- English title: I've got a jar of fat
- A-side: "Marietje (Want in het bos daar zijn de jagers)"
- Released: 1974
- Genre: Folk
- Length: 2:20
- Label: Polydor

"Ik heb een potje met vet" ("I've got a jar of fat") is a traditional song in the Dutch language. It was traditionally sung by soldiers, popularised in 1974 by the Dutch band Hydra with three verses added to the chorus, and now is very popular for singing during long walks and bus journeys. The song is also popular amongst lesbians because potje is the diminutive of the pot, originally a swearword for lesbians, but successfully reappropriated as a word for proud self-identification. It can be seen as the Dutch version of the similar English song "99 Bottles of Beer".

== Lyrics ==
=== 1974 Hydra version ===
Ik heb een vader en een moe
Die vinden mij een grote vent
Maar als ze wisten wat ik nou weer uitgevreten had
Dan is het herrie in de tent

Ik heb een potje met vet
Onder de tafel gezet
Ik heb een potje, potje, potje, potje vet
Onder de tafel gezet

M'n pa die is eraan gehecht
Maar vindt 'm nooit, zoekt zich kapot
Hij belt de pliesie als-ie straks z'n potje nodig heeft
En ik zit hier, en lach me rot

Ik heb een potje met vet
Onder de tafel gezet
Ik heb een potje, potje, potje, potje vet
Onder de tafel gezet

En iedereen die zoekt nou mee
In de WC, de meterkast
Onder de tafel zoekt geen mens, welnee, wie zoekt daar nou?
Ik zeg het niet, ik wil geen last

Ik heb een potje met vet
Onder de tafel gezet
Ik heb een potje, potje, potje, potje vet
Onder de tafel gezet
(repeat 3x)

=== Modern popular version ===
Dit is het eerste couplet.
Van een potje met vet.
Ik heb een potje met vet,
Al op de tafel gezet.
Ik heb een potje potje potje potje ve-e-et,
Al op de tafel gezet.

Dit is het tweede couplet... etc.

Translation into English:

This is the first verse.
Of a little jar of fat.
I've got a little jar of fat (grease),
I've got a little, little, little jar of fa-a-at
and put it on the table.

This is the second verse.
etc.
