= Nick Plumber =

American author and musician

- Born: July 28, 1969 (age 57)
- Education: University of Colorado Denver
- Occupations: Writer; Musician
- Writing career
- Years active: 2001–present
- Genres: Neo-noir; Science fiction; Fantasy
- Subjects: Alcohol culture; Travel; Poetry
- Website: hogbutlerpress.com

Nick Plumber is a Denver-based writer and musician. He has self-published several novels, written for a handful of journalistic outlets, sung for several Denver-based rock bands, and acted in independent films.

== Career ==
=== Author ===
Plumber is the author of five novels and a collection of poetry. His neo-noir novel, Whiskeyboat, follows a lonely self-tortured Denver cab driver's escapades in the city's seedy nightlife, and his struggle with self-actualization. Plumber’s compact poetry collection, Black Pills and Shotgun Stories, is an evolving work that he periodically adds to and republishes. Plumber has contributed three novels to R.D. Womack II's Imperial Odyssey series, which also includes books by, J.T. Morrow, Linda Phan, Shelley Reece, Michael A. Hereld, Christina P. Mason, Jameson "Mason" McDaniel, Paul D. Scavitto, and Coleman J. Rimer.

Plumber is a regular participant in Denver literary events, such as the OMF Book Fair. In 2020, he was a signatory to an open letter to Denver's Tattered Cover Bookstore.

=== Journalism ===
Plumber was the travel writer and poetry editor for Modern Drunkard Magazine from 2001 to 2015. He also co-hosted Modern Drunkard’s sporadically released podcast with the magazine’s editor, Frank Kelly Rich, and gave a presentation on the "History of Hooching," at the magazine’s 2004 Modern Drunkard Convention, in Las Vegas, Nevada. Plumber and his work have been featured in 303 Magazine, Miracle Magazine, and Dark Horse Comics' New Recruits.

=== Music ===
Plumber's first music gig was in 1992, when he put together an impromptu noise band. From 2001 to 2005, Plumber co-ran an all-ages D.I.Y. Denver venue called Hogbutler, that hosted shows for underground bands. In the 2000s, he was the singer of the Denver hard rock band Barstool Messiah, which released four albums and appeared on two compilations between 2001 and 2011. The band collaborated with blues and R&B singer Erica Brown on its final album, Whiskey Baptismal, and during live shows. Barstool Messiah performed live as recently as 2023.

Plumber also sang for the Denver hard rock band Whiskey Orphans, which played live on numerous occasions, but appears to have only released one song, on a tribute compilation.

== Bibliography ==
- Plumber, Nick (2017). Whiskeyboat. ISBN 978-0998722702.
- Plumber, Nick (2019). Black Pills and Shotgun Stories. ISBN 978-1084187221.

=== The Imperial Odyssey series ===
- Plumber, Nick (2013). Resheske, Lukas (ed.). Imperial Odyssey: When the Animal Rules us All (Fault Line, Book Three).
- Plumber, Nick (2018). Imperial Odyssey: Children of the Blood. ISBN 978-0998722719.
- Plumber, Nick (2025). Imperial Odyssey: The Order of Tyton. ISBN 979-8307598368.

=== The Curse of the Magi series ===
- Plumber, Nick (2021). The Carrion King: Curse of the Magi, Book One. ISBN 979-8470142887.

=== The Bards of Brendonwyr series ===
- Plumber, Nick (2024). Harp of the Moon: Bards of Brendonwyr, Book One. ISBN 979-8864698860.

== Discography ==
=== Barstool Messiah ===
- Whiskey Baptismal, 2022
- 13, 2012
- Bastards of Bacchus, 2011
- Imposters - Warlock Pinchers Tribute, 2002
- Undead In Denver, Volume 1, 2002

=== Whiskey Orphans ===
- Songs of Life and Death – An Izzy Cox Tribute Album, Vol. 1, 2018
