= Two World Wars and One World Cup =

English football song

"Two World Wars and One World Cup" is a football song sung by supporters of the England national football team to the tune of "Camptown Races" as part of the England–Germany football rivalry. The chant refers to the United Kingdom's victories in the First and Second World Wars, and England's 4–2 victory against West Germany after extra time in the final of the 1966 FIFA World Cup. The chant has also spawned similar chants such as "Stand up if you won the war" to the tune of "Go West".

== History ==
The chant is believed to have been created in the 1960s, after England had won the World Cup against West Germany. It was created by England fans to reflect on England's historic achievements. In 2006, Market traders in Leicester were banned from selling T-shirts with "Two World Wars, 1 World Cup" on them by Leicester City Council amid fears that the shirts "could cause offence". Before the 2006 FIFA World Cup, the Foreign and Commonwealth Office attempted to dissuade England fans from singing "Two World Wars and One World Cup" while in Germany. Despite these attempts, the chant was widely used by England fans whilst in Germany.

The chant has been criticised as "jingoistic", although a number of England supporters feel they are justified in singing it against Germany. However, it has been praised in some foreign media with one Australian commentator stating envy of England fans for being able to use it during the 2010 FIFA World Cup. A Canadian reporter also said that the chant reflected "a deeply historic sense of national honour". During the 2010 FIFA World Cup South African communications company, MTN Group ran a television advertisement on South African television involving the chant.

== Other uses ==
"Two World Wars and One World Cup" is also the name of an episode of the BBC documentary Everyman.

== See also ==
- Anglo-German relations
- "Don't mention the war!"
- Ten German Bombers
