= Anti-Austrian sentiment =

Sentiment hostile towards Austria or Austrians

Anti-Austrian sentiment (also known as Austrophobia) refers to hostile sentiment toward Austria and/or Austrians.

The 19th century British Prime Minister, William Ewart Gladstone, famously said in 1880 that "in the whole world it was impossible to place a finger on a spot and say, 'Here Austria did good'." In the following years, Gladstonian Liberals in Britain frequently repeated this saying.
