= Modern Drunkard =

American alcohol culture brand founded as a magazine in 1996

- Standing Up For Your Right To Get Falling Down Drunk Since 1996
- Modern Drunkard Magazine logo

- The Modern Drunkard standard
- Type: Magazine
- Format: Broadsheet
- Publisher: Frank Kelly Rich
- Editor: Frank Kelly Rich
- Founded: 1996
- Country: United States
- Circulation: 50,000
- Website: drunkard.com
- Free online archives: https://drunkard.com/back-issues/

Modern Drunkard is a glossy color lifestyle magazine and associated brand, which humorously and semi-seriously promotes the lifestyle of the "functional alcoholic." Modern Drunkard's standard features a martini glass with an olive above two crossed swords. Three letters, M, D and M, appear on the flag and stand for "Modern Drunkard Magazine."

== History ==
Frank Kelly Rich at the 2006 Modern Drunkard convention, Las Vegas, Nevada.

Frank Kelly Rich, a former U.S. Army Ranger, founded Modern Drunkard as a periodical in 1996. The first issue of Modern Drunkard was 16 photocopied pages with made-up ads; by 2005 its circulation was about 50,000. The magazine runs advertisements from bars in Denver, Minneapolis, Las Vegas and Philadelphia, as well as from companies selling drinking supplies. The print edition is available at newsstands and is also available for free in bars and liquor stores in the aforementioned cities. A UK launch of Modern Drunkard was considered in 2003, but never came to pass. Apart from his work through the magazine, Rich is occasionally interviewed about hangover cures and other alcohol-related issues for other publications and news outlets.

== Content ==
=== Print magazine content ===
May 2003 issue of Modern Drunkard.

The Modern Drunkard aesthetic style is reminiscent of once popular 1950s "men's action" pulp periodicals, with artwork depicting tough, lantern-jawed men and buxom women. Regular Modern Drunkard features include "Booze in the News," "Post Cards from Skid Row" (featuring poetry written by and/or for the inebriated), "Wino Wisdom," "Alcocomics − Cartoons for the sober challenged," and "You Know You're a Drunkard When..." The magazine also features articles on alcohol's place in history, including such topics as the Whiskey Rebellion and President Franklin D. Roosevelt's love of the martini. It frequently runs pieces arguing against MADD's positions, and in August 2004 had an editorial on the shrinking alcoholic proof of a bottle of Jack Daniel's.

Modern Drunkard has profiled and lauded historical drinkers such as Ernest Hemingway, Humphrey Bogart, Winston Churchill, W.C. Fields, Mark Twain, Charles Bukowski, The Rat Pack, and Hunter S. Thompson. It has also featured "Drunkard of The Issue" interviews with contemporary drinkers such as Doug Stanhope, Johnette Napolitano, Mojo Nixon, Lydia Lunch, Dan Dunn, Tucker Max, Josh Blue, Richard Cheese, Hank Williams III, and various other interviewees. In the early 2000s, the magazine repeatedly attempted to secure an interview with Christopher Hitchens, but was rebuffed because Hitchens stated he already had "too many enemies."

=== Online content ===
The Modern Drunkard website includes a section on its history, an FAQ page, an IRC chatroom, various articles from print back issues of the magazine, and an archive of Modern Drunkard podcast episodes (hosted by Rich and the magazine's poetry editor, Nick Plumber). It also sells various products bearing the Modern Drunkard standard and/or phrases related to the magazine itself and to the liberal consumption of alcohol. Modern Drunkard also produces short videos hosted on its YouTube channel.

== Staff ==
Apart from Rich, the publisher/editor, Modern Drunkard has featured writing and interviews by contributors such as Nick Plumber, Boyd Rice, Luke Schmaltz, Brian M. Clark, Richard English, and David Sipos, among others. It also regularly features the Drinky Crow character from the Maakies comic strip by Tony Millionaire, as well as artwork from Karl Christian Krumpholz. Staff are reportedly allowed to drink (and smoke) on the job, and are provided with a bar and a fridge containing beer.

== Books ==
The Modern Drunkard: A Handbook for Drinking in the 21st Century

In 2005 Penguin Books published a collection of numerous of Rich's articles previously published in the magazine, as The Modern Drunkard: A Handbook for Drinking in the 21st Century. In 2007 a German translation was published by Tropen Verlag. Prior to starting the magazine, Rich authored a series of cyberpunk science fiction novels in the 1980s, centered around a protagonist named Jake Straight. The initial novel in the Jake Straight series was published in 1984, and the four-book series was republished by Gold Eagle in 1993 and 1994, with covers illustrated by Tim Bradstreet. Several other Modern Drunkard staff members have also republished their work for the magazine in separate book collections.

=== Books by Modern Drunkard writers and illustrators ===
- Millionaire, Tony (2000). Drinky Crow's Maakies Treasury. ISBN 9781560979753.
- Rich, Frank Kelly (2005). The Modern Drunkard: A Handbook for Drinking in the 21st Century. ISBN 9781594481420.
- Rice, Boyd (2008). Standing in Two Circles: The Collected Works of Boyd Rice. ISBN 9781840681185.
- Krumpholz, Karl Christian (2014). 30 Miles of Crazy!. ASIN B0DM9SBQRQ.
- Krumpholz, Karl Christian (2015). 30 Miles of Crazy! Vol. 2: Another Round. ISBN 9781513600338.
- English, Richard (2015). Beer for The Genius. ISBN 9781941050095.
- Plumber, Nick (2017). Whiskeyboat. ISBN 9780998722702.
- Schmaltz, Luke (2023). The Belcher: Overserved Underdog. ISBN 9781735645803.
- Clark, Brian M. (2025). Drunk Jerk: A Chrestomathy of Carousal and Critique. ISBN 9798999211606.

== Conventions ==
Las Vegas EMTs responding to an incident at the 2006 Modern Drunkard Magazine convention.

Modern Drunkard held its first convention for readers and staff in 2004, at the Stardust Hotel in Las Vegas, Nevada. Events included live music, independent films, live burlesque, seminars, interviews and drinking games, all accompanied by bar service and many free drink promotions. It became an annual event, advertised as "The best time you'll never remember" and "Say it loud, say it plowed."

The second Modern Drunkard convention was held in Denver, Colorado, at The Ogden Theatre, in the summer of 2005. The third convention was again held in Las Vegas, in 2006. The fourth Modern Drunkard convention was held in 2008 (making it no longer "annual") at Three Kings Tavern, in Denver. The magazine does not appear to have had any subsequent conventions.
