= Repetitive song =

Type of song that repeats a word or phrase multiple times

Repetitive songs contain a large proportion of repeated words or phrases. Simple repetitive songs are common in many cultures as widely spread as the Caribbean, Southern India and Finland. The best-known examples are probably children's songs. Other repetitive songs are found, for instance, in African-American culture from the days of slavery.

== Children's songs ==
In children's songs, repetition serves various educational purposes: repetition aids memory, can aid in learning punctuation and reading skills, and is very valuable in learning (foreign) languages.

== Work songs ==
See also: Slave Songs of the United States.

Repetitive songs are also found in traditional work songs. Examples abound in African-American culture, in political groups, and among traveler, marchers, and walkers.

== See also ==
- Donald Knuth, "The Complexity of Songs"
- Cumulative song
- Repetitive music
