= Rub-a-Dub-Dub (TV series) =

- Also known as: Ultimate Nursery Rhymes Video, Musical Mother Goose
- Genre: Animation; Music
- Directed by: Alan Rogers
- Voices of: Madeline Bell; John Telfer
- Theme music composer: Benni Lees
- Opening theme: "Rub-a-Dub-Dub"
- Ending theme: "Rub-a-Dub-Dub"
- Country of origin: United Kingdom
- Original language: English
- No. of seasons: 1
- No. of episodes: 25

Production
- Producers: David Yates, Joe Wolf
- Running time: 5 minutes
- Production company: David Yates Production

Original release
- Network: ITV (CITV)
- Release: 17 October – 20 November 1984

Rub-A-Dub-Dub is a British television series animated by Peter Lang and Alan Rogers of the Cut-Out Animation Co. They were previously famous for Pigeon Street. The series was produced by David Yates and Joe Wolf. The title is a reference to the nursery rhyme Rub-a-dub-dub. Rub-A-Dub-Dub was animated in a similar way, yet all the characters were anthropomorphic animals. It ran in 1984, completing 25 episodes.

== Episode structure ==
The episodes usually started off with the character Mother Goose and (most often) another character stood by a polka-dot patterned bathtub, with Mother Goose saying "Rub-a-dub-dub..." announcing that there was an item in the tub, an item that will then be relevant to the episode, e.g. "Rub-a-dub-dub, there's a kettle in the tub..." The line would then usually be followed up by another. In this case, the character King Crow appears at the window and says "...And King Crow wants his tea!" The nursery rhymes themselves, performed by Madeline Bell and John Telfer, would be dotted in amongst the humorous dialogue between the animal characters.

== Characters ==
=== Principal characters ===
- Mother Goose: Could be considered the hostess of Rub-A-Dub-Dub. She begins every episode by saying "Rub-a-dub-dub, there's a... in the tub." She is a white goose, wearing what looks to be a yellow raincoat and hat, a blue skirt beneath the coat and blue shoes. She also wears pink tights with white spots.
- Polly: An irritable parrot. Their gender is ambiguous, as the song "Little Poll Parrot" refers to them with male pronouns while the song "Mrs. Mason Bought A Basin" refers to them with female pronouns. They often get annoyed with various characters, such as with Mother Goose when she asks them to make King Crow's tea. In this instance, they respond "I'm not gonna make it! Why does it always have to be me!? Humph!" They also often appear to be on the receiving end of bad luck, such as when they set their dinner down before the television, leave to get a drink, and then find their dinner has been stolen, to which they respond: "EH! Where did it go?!" Polly had a red face and blue hands and legs, wore a green jumper with red sleeves and yellow shoes.
- King Crow: The King who is a crow. He was awfully demanding of his servants such as Polly, on whom he intrudes into their TV-watching time, saying "Hello Polly, get me my pipe and bowl please!" He was also awfully energetic and bounced around a lot. Like all crows, King Crow was black with a yellow beak. He wore a stereotypical King's robe and crown, black and white striped stockings and black-and-white shoes.
- Queen Duck: The wife of King Crow. She was featured as The Queen of Hearts. She wore a blue dress with a red heart on the chest and heart-patterned sleeves.
- Al E. Gator: An alligator who was somewhat of an antagonist on the show. He was always causing trouble, such as tripping over Baa Sheep and causing him to fall in mud, or interrupting Polly's favourite TV show as "Tonight's Special Guest". He wore a red coat and a top hat. In one episode, he lost his violin bow. He does have a good side though, as he helped nurse Yankee Doodle back to health when the latter knocked himself out after doing his morning exercises.
- Baa Sheep: A white sheep who wore red shoes. He once fell victim to Al E. Gator's mischief, when he tripped him over and caused him to fall into a muddy puddle. This dirtied his wool and left him displeased. He sang I do not like thee, Doctor Fell to him. Al E Gator simply laughed and asked "What did I do wrong?" before leaving. Baa was also close to Mother Goose, who cleaned him up in the eponymous tub after this incident.
- Buzz Tiger: A tiger with melissophobia (fear of bees). He seemed to be romantically involved with Mary the giraffe.
- Brian Lion: A lion who was good friends with Buzz and Blue.
- Olga Ostrich: An ostrich who wore pink shoes. She once lost one of these shoes in one episode. She was also sat at the same restaurant as Polly when they had their dinner stolen.
- The Penguin Trio: Three traveling penguins, who served as soldiers and musicians for King Crow as well as inattentive waiters at the restaurant.
- Jack and Jill: Two twin pigs. They both wore red and yellow tops and red shoes. Jack wore a yellow striped red hat and the Jill had blonde hair with two plaits with red bows. Jack was more heavily featured than his sister, although in Jack and Jill, Mrs. Mason's Basin and Jack Sprat they were featured together. They were Elsie Pig's children and had a baby sibling.
- Elsie Pig: The mother of Jack and Jill and an unnamed baby. She wore a yellow and black dress and matching hat. She appeared to be a cleaner in the castle like Mother Goose.
- Baby Pig: The unseen, unnamed baby sibling of Jack and Jill. They were never actually shown, their entire body obscured by a baby stroller.
- Blue: A blue hippopotamus who wore a yellow raincoat and rain hat, similar to Mother Goose. He was featured on Polly's favorite Western TV show. He was due to face off in a duel with Yankee Doodle, before they were interrupted by Al E. Gator. He also appeared as Santa Claus in one episode and Little Boy Blue in another.
- Yankee Doodle: A white cowboy rooster married to Mrs. Doodle. He was often seen jogging and weightlifting. He was featured on Polly's favorite Western TV show. He was due to face off in a duel with Blue the hippo, before being interrupted by Al E. Gator.
- Mrs. Doodle: A brown hen who was married to Yankee Doodle.
- Tom Cat: A young cat who went to London to see the Queen. The Queen Duck asked him to catch one of the mice in the castle, but ended up knocking all of the furniture over and was sent away. He was often depicted as a troublemaker who enjoyed stealing others' food.
- Yellow Dog: A yellow dog who wears a blue sweater and often liked to make jokes.
- Mice: Three mice that were often in some nursery rhymes, one dressed as a Chef, one as a Butcher, and one in a yellow top with red, green and blue stars. They appeared as the Butcher, the Baker and the Candlestick Maker in the show's eponymous rhyme and the Three Blind Mice.
- Mary Giraffe: A giraffe who wore a blue sweatshirt with a giraffe number 11 and a pink skirt with pink shoes. She often appeared to be romantically involved with Buzz the Tiger.
- Barney Owl: An owl who wore a purple coat and hat and glasses. He was married to Bo Peep, and attempted to fall asleep at night before being interrupted multiple times, first from the noise of children playing and second from the baby stroller he slept in falling out from the tree. He can be considered to be soft-spoken and dislikes loud noises, as per the song lyrics, "the more he saw the less he spoke, the less he spoke the more he heard".
- Bo Peep: A female owl who played the role of Little Bo Peep, who was often seen with Queen Duck. She wore a white dress with polka dots and carried around a shepherd's crook.
- Roland Turtle: A green turtle who wore brown shoes and glasses with yellow edges. He had the ability to attach wheels to the bottom of his shell, as well as roller skates, use his shell as a boat and also travel by balloon.
- Quincy the Spider: A spider who wore green, red and yellow roller skates who played the role of the Incy Wincy Spider.
- Pat Cat: An orange, bespectacled cat who played the role of the teacher in Mary Had a Little Lamb.
- Melody Moo: a red cow who appeared to be a bit of a performer, often seen singing at the Palm Court restaurant.
- Ned the Horse: A white horse who wore red shoes. He is a bit of a troublemaker and does not speak at all. One time, he took King Crow's crown for being called a unicorn when he wore a candle on his head.

=== Minor characters ===
- Purple Bird: a purple bird with a green crest who appears as one of the children in Girls and Boys Come Out to Play and as a student in Mary Had a Little Lamb.
- Puffin: a puffin in an orange sweater who appears as one of the children in Girls and Boys Come Out to Play and There Was an Old Woman Who Lived in a Shoe.
- Humpty Dumpty: An egg with a face drawn on by Quincy the Spider, which hatches legs and is placed on a wall made of wooden building blocks. After falling off the wall, Humpty fully hatches, revealing him to be an ostrich like Olga Ostrich. He appears as one of the children in There Was an Old Woman Who Lived in a Shoe.
- Blackbirds: twenty-four blackbirds who played the role of the blackbirds baked in a pie in Sing A Song Of Sixpence. Two of them were shown sitting on the hill that Jack and Jill climbed up.
- Hobby Horse: a hobby horse with an identical head to Ned, albeit featured as a separate character. Despite being claimed to be an inanimate object by Yankee Doodle, the hobby horse makes expressions and blinks.

== Episodes ==
All episodes are listed in order of appearance in The Ultimate Nursery Rhymes Video VHS release.

No.	Title
1	"Mary Mary Quite Contrary"
Mary Giraffe and Buzz Tiger engage in shenanigans in a garden wherein they are chased by a bee and ultimately push Tom Cat into a well.
2	"The House that Jack Built"
Jack Pig builds a house from oversized toy building blocks, around which various events occur.
3	"Hey Diddle Diddle"
Melody Moo jumps over the moon and crashes into Yellow Dog's house, sending him flying into space. Roland Turtle helps him get back down.
4	"Star Light, Star Bright"
In a direct sequel to Hey Diddle Diddle, Yellow Dog and Roland Turtle are sent back into space by a waiter penguin.
5	"It's Raining, It's Pouring"
One of Yankee Doodle's dumbbells falls on his head, leading Mrs. Doodle to call Al E. Gator (called Dr. Foster in this episode).
6	"Tom Tom the Piper's Son"
Tom Cat gets caught stealing a pig-shaped bun from Baby Pig and later steals jam tarts from Queen Duck.
7	"Old King Cole"
Three penguin fiddlers perform for King Crow, who orders Polly to make him tea.
8	"Poor Old Robinson Crusoe"
Buzz Tiger plants a "little nut tree" bearing only a silver nutmeg and a golden pear. He gets stranded on a small island and rescued by Blue Hippo and Brian Lion in the Rub-a-Dub-Dub tub.
9	"Three Men in a Tub"
The three mice are chased out of and around the tub by Mother Goose, who pulls the plug flushing down the mice. The mice arrive at the shores of a river and chase Pat Cat around. When he falls into the ocean, one mouse catches fish before fishing Pat out on the shore.
10	"Little Bo Peep"
Bo Peep tries desperately to retrieve Baa Sheep. Blue Hippo falls asleep and dreams of bells arguing and being pursued by an evil, hatchet-wielding version of Bo Peep.
11	"Yankee Doodle"
While riding on the Hobby Horse, Yankee Doodle encounters Olga Ostrich dancing on Ned the Horse's back. Ned steals Olga's shoe and breaks Al E. Gator's fiddle stick.
12	"Incy Wincey Spider"
Quincy Spider scares Olga Ostrich away from the egg she was sitting on, which he draws a face on. The egg sprouts legs, becoming Humpty Dumpty.
13	"A Wise Old Owl/I Had a Cat"
In the show's longest episode, Barney Owl tries to sleep but is constantly interrupted by the noise of children playing. He chases the children back into their beds and retreats back into his baby carriage at the top of his tree, only to fall out of the tree where the carriage rolls and hits Roland Turtle, and he exclaims "now I know why owls don't sleep at night". Later, he, along with Pat Cat and a multitude of other characters, perform a rousing rendition of "I Had a Cat".
14	"Jack and Jill"
Elsie Pig gets overwhelmed by household chores. Feeling pity for her, Jack and Jill climb a hill to get water to clean the floor.
15	"The Grand Old Duke of York"
Tom Cat's incessant pipe-playing sets off King Crow after the former blows off the King's crown with his pipe, leading the King to pursue Tom with an army of penguins.
16	"Here We Go Round the Mulberry Bush"
Mary Giraffe and Baa Sheep play around the mulberry bush. Baa Sheep's attempt to follow Mary to school is met with strong anti-sheep resistance.
17	"The Lion and the Unicorn"
Brian Lion rides through town on Ned the Horse, who wears a candle on his head. King Crow mocks the candle on Ned's head saying "he thinks he's a unicorn! Haw haw haw!", leading Ned to steal the King's crown, with the King and Brian in hot pursuit.
18	"There Was an Old Woman"
Mother Goose brings the other characters over to supper at her shoe house, and watches a TV show about Melody Moo and Yellow Dog.
19	"Christmas Comes"
During the Christmas season, Mrs. Doodle prepares plum pies which are bought and eaten by Jack Pig. Jill tricks Jack into eating custard laced with spicy mustard, which he breaks the bowl of as he rushes off to douse his mouth in water. Jill buys another bowl, which Polly Parrot breaks for no reason. Blue Hippo (dressed as Santa) gives Elsie Pig a third and final bowl.
20	"Baa Baa Black Sheep"
Al E. Gator plays nasty tricks on Roland Turtle and Baa Sheep, causing them to trip and fall, with Baa Sheep in particular falling into a puddle of mud, staining his white fur black. Baa Sheep sells bags of wool to Yankee Doodle, Mrs. Doodle and Roland Turtle, the lattermost of whom kicks Al into another puddle of mud.
21	"Pussy Cat, Pussy Cat"
Tom Cat asks the way to London. One of the mice annoys Bo Peep and Queen Duck, who convince Tom to chase the mouse out of the royal palace. Tom chases the mouse around a grandfather clock but ends up knocking all the furniture over and is sent out. All the furniture is set back upright.
22	"Little Poll Parrot"
One of the mice steals all of Polly Parrot's food in their house, leading them to dine at the Palm Court restaurant. The mice stalk customers at the restaurant and steal their food, even the ones already cooking in the kitchen, causing uproar as the mice have a picnic of stolen food in the moonlight.
23	"To Market, To Market"
While heading off to market to buy food for his family, Jack Pig gets distracted when he decides to get a haircut at Baa Sheep's barbershop. Baa Sheep sneezes sending Jack's barber chair flying up where it lands on a pillar, and he is brought down by Roland Turtle. Jack boasts about his exploits to Elsie and Jill.
24	"One for the Money"
In the series finale, Yellow Dog and King Crow buy pies from one of the mice. King Crow's pie turns out to be absolutely filled with blackbirds. One of the birds steals Mrs. Doodle's beak and drops it on a snail, which jumps into and floods the Rub-a-Dub-Dub tub and the bathroom it occupies.

== Release ==
It was directed by Lee Bernhardi. It ran on Children's ITV from 17 October 1984 until 20 November 1984 and it also ran on The Disney Channel in the 80s in the United States, TV1 in South Africa, Saudi 2 in Saudi Arabia and Knowledge Network in Canada. During its United States run, episodes were split up as interstitials in between shows.

The series was later distributed on VHS in two separate volumes in North America twice, both by Hi-Tops Video under its original titles 'Rub-a-Dub-Dub' Volume 1 & 2 in 1986–87, and re-released in 1989 under the titles 'Musical Mother Goose' and 'More Musical Mother Goose' respectively. The series was also released on VHS in the UK market by Thames Video under the title 'The Ultimate Nursery Rhymes Video' on 10 February 1992, which has since not been distributed.
