= Rhyme Time Town =

- Genre: Children's; Animation; Comedy; Jukebox musical
- Based on: various nursery rhymes
- Developed by: Dan Berlinka
- Written by: Andrew Emerson
- Voices of: Annabelle Westenholz-Smith; Luke Amis
- Opening theme: "Let's Go to Rhyme Time Town" by Luke Amis and Annabelle Westenholz-Smith
- Composer: Michael Kramer
- Country of origin: United States
- Original language: English
- No. of seasons: 2
- No. of episodes: 21 (39 segments)

Production
- Executive producer: Eric Shaw
- Running time: 22 minutes
- Production company: DreamWorks Animation Television

Original release
- Network: Netflix
- Release: June 19, 2020 – June 15, 2021

Rhyme Time Town is an American children's animated jukebox musical comedy television series developed by DreamWorks Animation Television that reimagines classic nursery rhymes from the viewpoints of two preschoolers, Daisy the puppy and Cole the kitten. It premiered on June 19, 2020, on Netflix. A 10-episode sing-a-long series titled Rhyme Time Town Singalongs was released on December 22, 2020.

Season 1 was released on Netflix on June 19, 2020. Season 2 was released on Netflix on June 15, 2021.

== Cast ==
- Annabelle Westenholz-Smith as Daisy & Little Lamb (Season 1)
- Luke Amis as Cole
- Maddie Evans as Mary Mary
- Jude Muir as Humpty Dumpty
- Louis Suc as Jack and Sled Dog #5
- Petra Joan-Athene as Jill and Sled Dog #2
- Angeli Wall as Jamie the Train
- Rachel John as Old MacDonald
- Katie Dalton as Lucy Goosey and Sled Dog #1
- Kate Sissons as Itsy Bitsy Spider
- Holly Hazelton as Baa Baa Black Sheep and Sled Dog #3
- Hannah Jane Fox as Mumpty Dumpty, Polly Chipmunk & Ms. Moon
- Antonio Mattera as Cosmo
- Nicolette McKenzie as Mother Goose
- Darcy Jacobs as Twinkle Star and Hayley the Comet
- Richard Frame as Mr. Golden Sun
- Christine Allado as The Cow Who Jumps Over The Moon
- Rhashan Stone as Hickory Dickory Dock, Judge Dish, & Hermit crab
- Emma Stannard as Mrs. Chicken, Griffin/Baby Dragon, Little Lamb (Season 2) and Sled Dog #4
- Nina Wadia as Molly Chipmunk & Mayor Spoon
- Josh Whitehouse as Chuckley Bear
- Emma Williams as Mama Bunny
- Shaheen Khan as Lady Ladle
- Leonora Haig as Jenny Wren
- Jessica Zerlina Leafe as Little Bo Peep
- Dan Mersh as Daddy Dragon
- Matt Mella as King's Man
- Andy Nyman as King of Hearts
- Rebecca Omgbehin as Queen of Hearts
- Daisy O'Dwyer as Princess Portia
- Ben Simpson as Max
- Ryan Sampson as Peter Piper
- Golda Rosheuvel as Castle Clock and Wing Commander of Four and Twenty Blackbirds
- Alexandra Burton as Leader Sled Dog
- Clark Devlin as Indigo

== Episodes ==
=== Series overview ===
Season	Segments	Episodes	Originally released
1	12	6	June 19, 2020
Singalongs	30	10	December 22, 2020
2	27	15	June 15, 2021

=== Season 1 (2020) ===
No. overall	No. in season	Title	Directed by	Written by	Original release date
1a	1a	"Mary Mary Had a Little Lamb"	Colleen Holub & Luc Latulippe	Rebecca Stevens	June 19, 2020
1b	1b	"Cosmo's Moon Jump"	Colleen Holub	Andrew Emerson	June 19, 2020
2a	2a	"The Trouble with Humpty"	Luc Latulippe	Dan Berlinka	June 19, 2020
2b	2b	"Cheer Up, Twinkle Star/Twinkle Twinkle Little Star"	Luc Latulippe	Lizzie Ennever	June 19, 2020
3a	3a	"The Snorey Roary Rain Monster/It's Raining It's Pouring"	Nuranee Shaw	Danny Stack	June 19, 2020
3b	3b	"The Bunnies' Shoe House/There Was an Old Woman Who Lived in a Shoe"	Nuranee Shaw	Chris Bowden	June 19, 2020
4a	4a	"Super Kitten and Power Pupster"	Colleen Holub	Andrew Emerson	June 19, 2020
4b	4b	"What's the Time, Hickory?"	Colleen Holub	Dan Berlinka & Sean Carson	June 19, 2020
5a	5a	"Ms. McDonald's Farmers"	Luc Latulippe	Isabel Fay	June 19, 2020
5b	5b	"Jaime's Bridge has Fallen Down/London Bridge is Falling Down"	Luc Latulippe & Nuranee Shaw	Lizzie Ennever	June 19, 2020
6a	6a	"Race Car Relay/Jack and Jill"	Colleen Holub & Nuranee Shaw	Chris Bowden	June 19, 2020
6b	6b	"Mary Mary's Contrary Tea Party/Mary Mary Quite Contrary"	Nuranee Shaw	Carol Noble	June 19, 2020

=== Rhyme Time Town Singalongs (2020) ===
No.	Title	Directed by	Written by	Original release date
1a	"See Saw Mumpty Daw/See Saw Margery Daw"	Colleen Holub	Lizzie Ennever	December 22, 2020
1b	"Mary Mary Quite Contrary"	Colleen Holub	Lizzie Ennever	December 22, 2020
1c	"Mary Mary's Hiking Trip"	Luc Latulippe	Annika Bluhm	December 22, 2020
2a	"Granny Dumpty's Garden"	Nuranee Shaw	Chris Bowden	December 22, 2020
2b	"Old MacDonald Had a Farm"	Luc Latulippe	Andrew Emerson	December 22, 2020
2c	"Jack and Jill's Boat Ride"	Luc Latulippe	Annika Bluhm; Story by : Andrew Emerson	December 22, 2020
3a	"Carnival Samba"	Nuranee Shaw	Chris Bowden	December 22, 2020
3b	"The Itsy Bitsy Spider"	Nuranee Shaw	Chris Bowden	December 22, 2020
3c	"Shadow Puppets"	Nuranee Shaw	Chris Bowden	December 22, 2020
4a	"Humpty Goes Fishing"	Luc Latulippe	Annika Bluhm	December 22, 2020
4b	"Humpty Dumpty Sat on a Wall"	Luc Latulippe	Dan Berlinka	December 22, 2020
4c	"Humpty's Snow Day"	Colleen Holub	Lizzie Ennever	December 22, 2020
5a	"Jaime's Ride and See"	Nuranee Shaw	Annika Bluhm	December 22, 2020
5b	"Hickory Dickory Dock"	Nuranee Shaw	Annika Bluhm	December 22, 2020
5c	"Chuckley's Fruit Fest"	Nuranee Shaw	Annika Bluhm	December 22, 2020
6a	"Cow Jig"	Colleen Holub	Katie Simmons	December 22, 2020
6b	"Frère Jacques"	Colleen Holub	Katie Simmons	December 22, 2020
6c	"Itsy Bitsy's Mosaic"	Colleen Holub	Katie Simmons	December 22, 2020
7a	"Mary Mary's Mango Cake"	Luc Latulippe	Andrew Emerson	December 22, 2020
7b	"Twinkle Twinkle Little Star"	Nuranee Shaw	Chris Bowden	December 22, 2020
7c	"Itsy Bitsy's Water Spout"	Nuranee Shaw	Chris Bowden	December 22, 2020
8a	"The Teaspoon Dance"	Nuranee Shaw	Lizzie Ennever	December 22, 2020
8b	"London Bridge Is Falling Down"	Luc Latulippe	Andrew Emerson	December 22, 2020
8c	"The Happy Hyena"	Luc Latulippe	Rebecca Stevens	December 22, 2020
9a	"Bunny Bedtime"	Colleen Holub	Isabel Fay	December 22, 2020
9b	"Hey Diddle Diddle"	Colleen Holub	Isabel Fay	December 22, 2020
9c	"Humpty Row Row Row Your Boat"	Colleen Holub	Isabel Fay	December 22, 2020
10a	"Snow Monkey Garden"	Nuranee Shaw	Lizzie Ennever	December 22, 2020
10b	"Pat-A-Cake"	Nuranee Shaw	Lizzie Ennever	December 22, 2020
10c	"Looking for Lenny"	Luc Latulippe	Rebecca Stevens	December 22, 2020

=== Season 2 (2021) ===
No. overall	No. in season	Title	Directed by	Written by	Original release date
7a	1a	"Sneezy Train/Ring Around the Rosie"	Luc Latulippe	Andrew Emerson	June 15, 2021
7b	1b	"Round the Mulberry Bush/Here We Go Round the Mulberry Bush"	Colleen Holub	Lizzie Ennever	June 15, 2021
8a	2a	"The Missing Watering Can/Farmer in the Dell"	Nuranee Shaw	Chris Bowden	June 15, 2021
8b	2b	"Daisy's Daisy/Daisy Daisy"	Luc Latulippe and IBM 7094	Andrew Emerson and IBM 7094	June 15, 2020
9a	3a	"Wizarding Weather"	Nuranee Shaw	Rebecca Stevens	June 15, 2021
9b	3b	"Hayley the Comet"	Colleen Holub	Chris Bowden	June 15, 2021
10	4	"Princess Portia's Birthday Party"	Colleen Holub & Luc Latulippe	Andrew Emerson	June 15, 2021
11	5	"Hush-a-Bye Dragon/Rock-A-Bye Baby"	Colleen Holub & Luc Latulippe	Andrew Emerson	June 15, 2021
12a	6a	"Cat King Cole/Old King Cole"	Colleen Holub	Chris Bowden	June 15, 2021
12b	6b	"Hickory Helpers' Camping Trip"	Nuranee Shaw	Lizzie Ennever	June 15, 2021
13a	7a	"The Rainbow Treasure"	Colleen Holub	Annika Bluhm	June 15, 2021
13b	7b	"The Wizards' Key"	Luc Latulippe	Isabel Fay	June 15, 2021
14a	8a	"Lions vs. Unicorns/The Lion and the Unicorn"	Nuranee Shaw	Lizzie Ennever	June 15, 2021
14b	8b	"Four and Twenty Blackbirds/Sing a Song of Sixpence"	Luc Latulippe	Isabel Fay	June 15, 2021
15a	9a	"Dinosaurs on the Farm"	Nuranee Shaw	Andrew Emerson	June 15, 2021
15b	9b	"Mary Mary's Hungry Friend"	Colleen Holub	Eric Shaw	June 15, 2021
16a	10a	"Let's Build a Scarecrow"	Luc Latulippe	Annika Bluhm; Story by : Gabby Dawnay	June 15, 2021
16b	10b	"Super Egg"	Nuranee Shaw	Isabel Fay	June 15, 2021
17a	11a	"Search and Rescue Training Day"	Luc Latulippe	Chris Bowden	June 15, 2021
17b	11b	"Lady Ladle's Circus"	Colleen Holub	Lizzie Ennever	June 15, 2021
18a	12a	"Three Kind Mice/Three Blind Mice"	Nuranee Shaw	Isabel Fay	June 15, 2021
18b	12b	"Speedy Delivery"	Luc Latulippe	Chris Bowden	June 15, 2021
19a	13a	"Rub-A-Dub Pirates"	Colleen Holub	Katie Simmons	June 15, 2021
19b	13b	"New Best Friends"	Nuranee Shaw	Rebecca Stevens	June 15, 2021
20a	14a	"Sandcastles"	Colleen Holub	Katie Simmons	June 15, 2021
20b	14b	"Bo Peep's Sheep/Little Bo Peep"	Luc Latulippe	Lizzie Ennever	June 15, 2021
21	15	"Indigo the Unicorn"	Luc Latulippe & Nuranee Shaw	Andrew Emerson	June 15, 2021

== Music ==
=== Vol. 1 ===
All music is composed by Various Artists.

No.	Title	Length
1.	"Let's Go to Rhyme Time Town"	02:07
2.	"Jamie's Train"	00:44
3.	"Polly Put the Kettle On"	01:39
4.	"Baa Baa Black Sheep"	00:20
5.	"Itsy Bitsy Spider"	01:13
6.	"Twinkle Twinkle Little Star"	00:38
7.	"Mary Mary Quite Contrary"	00:15
8.	"Row Row Row Your Boat"	01:16
9.	"Mary Had a Little Lamb"	00:48
10.	"Jamie's Bridge"	00:31
11.	"Ms. McDonald Had a Farm"	01:00
12.	"Jack and Jill"	00:19
13.	"Pat A Cake"	01:41
