= Rub-a-dub-dub =

Nursery rhyme and traditional song

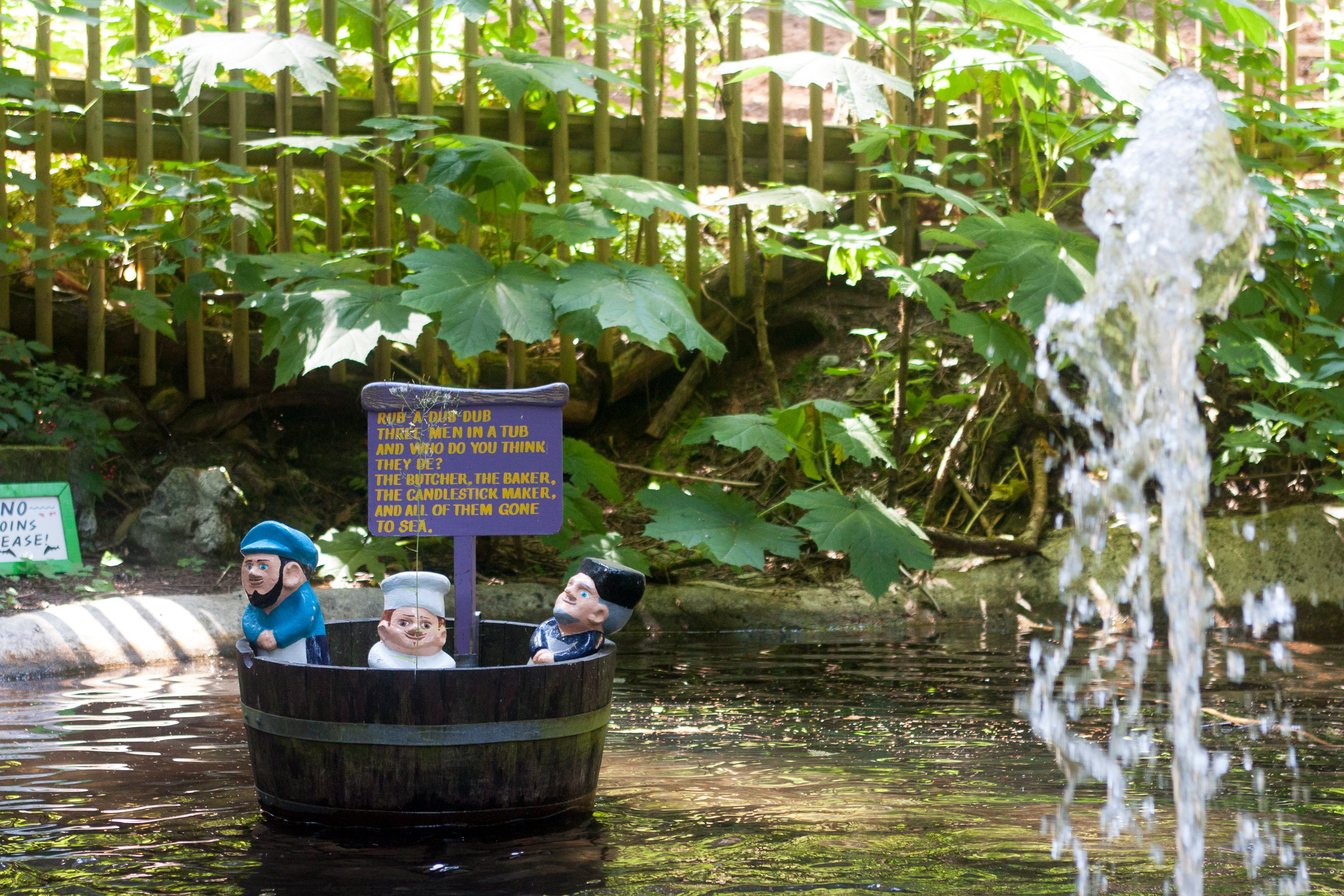

Nursery rhyme
- Published: 1798

"Rub-a-dub-dub" is an English language nursery rhyme first published at the end of the 18th century in volume two of James Hook's Christmas Box under the title "Dub a dub dub" rather than "Rub a dub dub". It has a Roud Folk Song Index number of 3101.

== Lyrics ==
This rhyme exists in many variations. Among those current today is:

Rub-a-dub-dub,
Three men in a tub,
And who do you think they be?
The butcher, the baker, the candlestick maker,
And all of them out to sea.

== Origins and meaning ==
The earliest published versions of this rhyme differ significantly in their wording. Dating back to the 14th century, the original rhyme makes reference to maids in a "tub" – a fairground attraction similar to a modern peep show. The rhyme is of a type calling out otherwise respectable people for disrespectable actions, in this case, ogling naked ladies – the maids. The nonsense "rub-a-dub-dub" develops a phonetic association of social disapprobation, analogous to "tsk-tsk", albeit of a more lascivious variety. The nursery rhyme is a form of teaching such associations in folklore: for individuals raised with such social codes, the phrase "rub-a-dub-dub" alone could stand in for gossip or innuendo without communicating all of the details.

One early recorded version in Christmas Box, published in London in 1798, has wording similar to that in Mother Goose's Quarto or Melodies Complete, published in Boston, Massachusetts around 1825. The latter ran:

Hey! rub-a-dub, ho! rub-a-dub, three maids in a tub,
And who do you think were there?
The butcher, the baker, the candlestick-maker,
And all of them gone to the fair.

In the original version as it appeared both in England and in the United States (Boston) the song was talking about three maids instead of three men. Later research, according to The Oxford Dictionary of Nursery Rhymes (1951), suggests that the lyrics are illustrating a scene of three respectable townsfolk "watching a dubious sideshow at a local fair".

By around 1830 the reference to maids was being removed from the versions printed in nursery books. In 1842 James Orchard Halliwell collected the following version:

Rub a dub dub,
Three fools in a tub,
And who do you think they be?
The butcher, the baker,
The candlestick maker.
Turn them out, knaves all three.

On a 1958 vinyl album of Mother Goose Nursery Rhymes [by Caedmon] with Boris Karloff, he sings a different version of the song that goes like this:

Rub a dub dub,
Three men in a tub,
And how do you think they got there?
The butcher, the baker,
The candlestick maker.
They all jumped out of a rotten potato,
Was enough to make a man stare.

There are several variants of the following story:

A pilot returning from a mission could not locate his aircraft carrier and in addition failed to establish secure communication. So he circled around the formation and radioed: "Rub a dub dub, where is my tub?" And received: "Hey Diddle Diddle! Right here in the middle!"

Some memoirs claim it was a real incident.

== Allusions ==
Robert Browning alluded to the rhyme in his collection Pacchiarotto, and How He Worked in Distemper:

I want to know a butcher paints,
A baker rhymes for his pursuit,
Candlestick-maker, much acquaints
His soul with song, or, haply mute,
Blows out his brains upon the flute!

— "Shop" XXI

"Rub-a-dub-dub" or sometimes just "rub-a-dub" is Cockney rhyming slang for "pub".

"Rub-A-Dub-Dub" is the title of a 1953 country music song by Hank Thompson, a 1984 animated television series by Peter Lang and Alan Rogers, and a 2023 novel by Robert Wringham.
