= Little Poll Parrot =

Nursery rhyme

Nursery rhyme
- Published: 1853
- Songwriter(s): Unknown

"Little Poll Parrot" is an English language nursery rhyme. It has a Roud Folk Song Index number of 20178.

== Lyrics ==
Like Little Miss Muffet and Little Jack Horner the verse is an example of a nursery rhyme that contains six dactylic lines. The most common modern version of the lyrics is:

Little Poll Parrot
Sat in his garret
Eating toast and tea;
A little brown mouse
Jumped into the house,
And stole it all away.

== Origins ==
It has been argued that the rhyme originates in the seventeenth century. The earliest printed version was in a collection by James Orchard Halliwell in the 1840s.
