= Little Miss Muffet =

English nursery rhyme

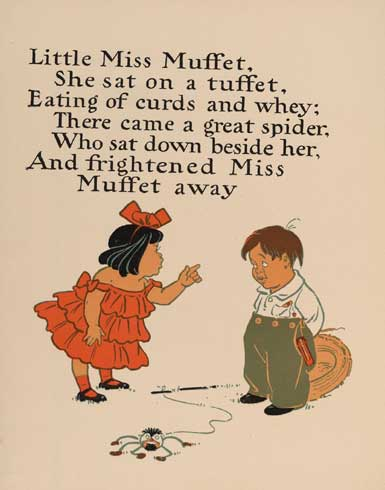
- William Wallace Denslow's illustrations for one version of the rhyme, from a 1901 edition of Mother Goose
- Publication date: 1805

"Little Miss Muffet" is an English nursery rhyme of uncertain origin, first recorded in 1805. It has a Roud Folk Song Index number of 20605. The rhyme has for over a century attracted discussion as to the proper meaning of the word tuffet.

== Wording ==
The rhyme first appeared in print in Songs for the Nursery (1805), and there have been many variants since. The Oxford Dictionary of Nursery Rhymes gives the following:

Little Miss Muffet
Sat on a tuffet,
Eating her curds and whey;
There came a big spider,
Who sat down beside her
And frightened Miss Muffet away.

Older versions sometimes use "of" rather than "her" in line 3, and refer to a "little spider" as in this example dating between 1837 and 1845:

Little Miss Muffet
She sat on a tuffet,
Eating of curds and whey;
There came a little spider,
Who sat down beside her,
And frighten'd Miss Muffet away.

There are several early-published versions with significant variations including "Little Mary Ester sat upon a tester" (1812) and "Little Miss Mopsey, Sat in the shopsey" (1842). Other collected variants have included "Little Miss Muffet, sat on a toffet" (1830s?) and "Little Miss Muffet, sat on a buffet" (1840s?). In a later United States example, "whey" was replaced with "pie".

== Tuffet ==
Although the word tuffet is now sometimes used to mean a type of low seat, the word in the rhyme probably originally referred to a grassy hillock, small knoll or mound (a variant spelling of an obsolete and rare meaning of "tuft"). The Oxford English Dictionary calls the "hassock or footstool" meaning "doubtful", and "perhaps due to misunderstanding of the nursery rhyme". Many modern dictionaries including Collins, Merriam-Webster, Chambers 21st Century Dictionary and Oxford Dictionaries, however, now give both meanings.

=== Uncertain meaning ===
Since the rhyme provides little context, several writers have expressed confusion about its meaning. In 1902, Samuel M. Crothers remarked, "Perhaps some of you would like to know what a tuffet is. I have thought of that myself, and have taken the trouble to ask several learned persons. They assure me that the most complete and satisfactory definition is,—a tuffet is the kind of thing that Miss Muffet sat on."

=== As a grassy mound ===
According to the Oxford English Dictionary the word in the nursery rhyme may refer to "a grassy hillock, a small knoll or mound".

Earlier recorded examples of tuffet with the related meaning "tuft" (for example a cluster of short-stalked leaves or flowers growing from a common point) date back to 1553. The Merriam-Webster dictionary suggests that the word derives from the Anglo-French tuffete, from "tufe", meaning "tuft".

Many illustrators have shown Miss Muffet sitting on a mound or hillock, including John Everett Millais (1884) and Arthur Rackham (1913).

Tuffet as a grassy mound

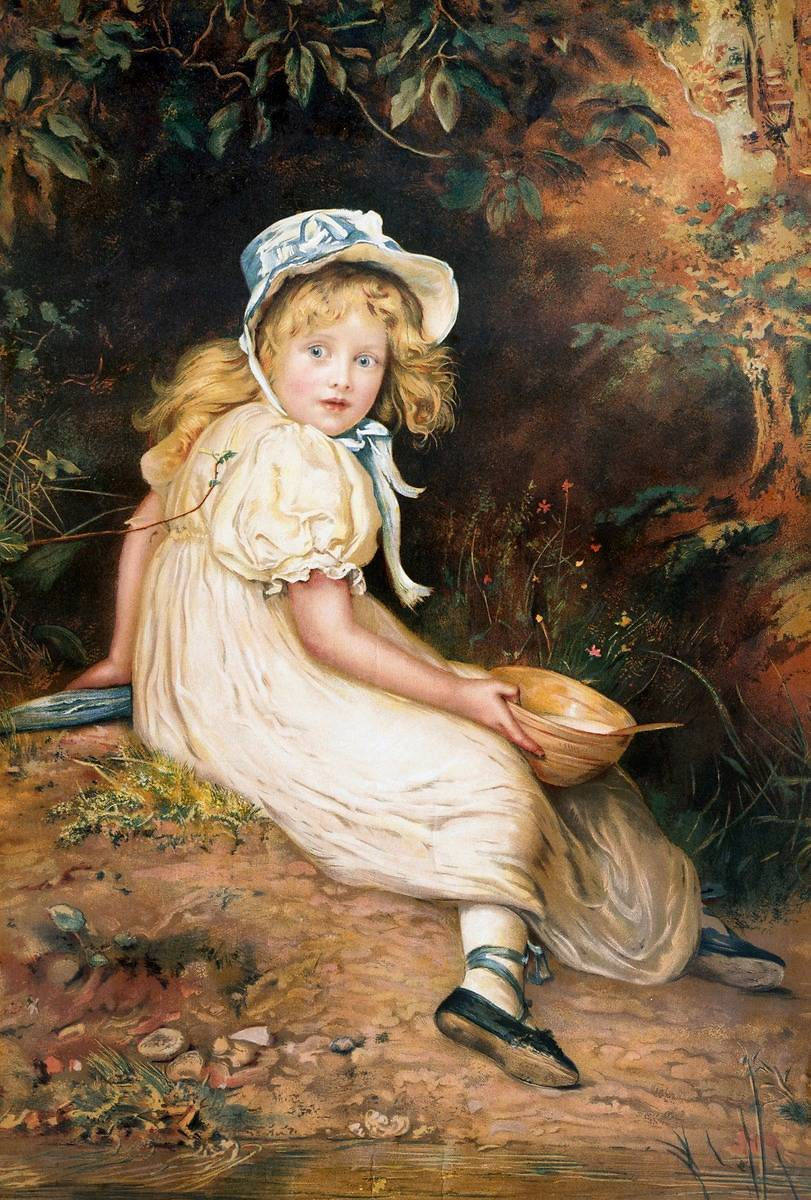
Painting by John Everett Millais, 1884

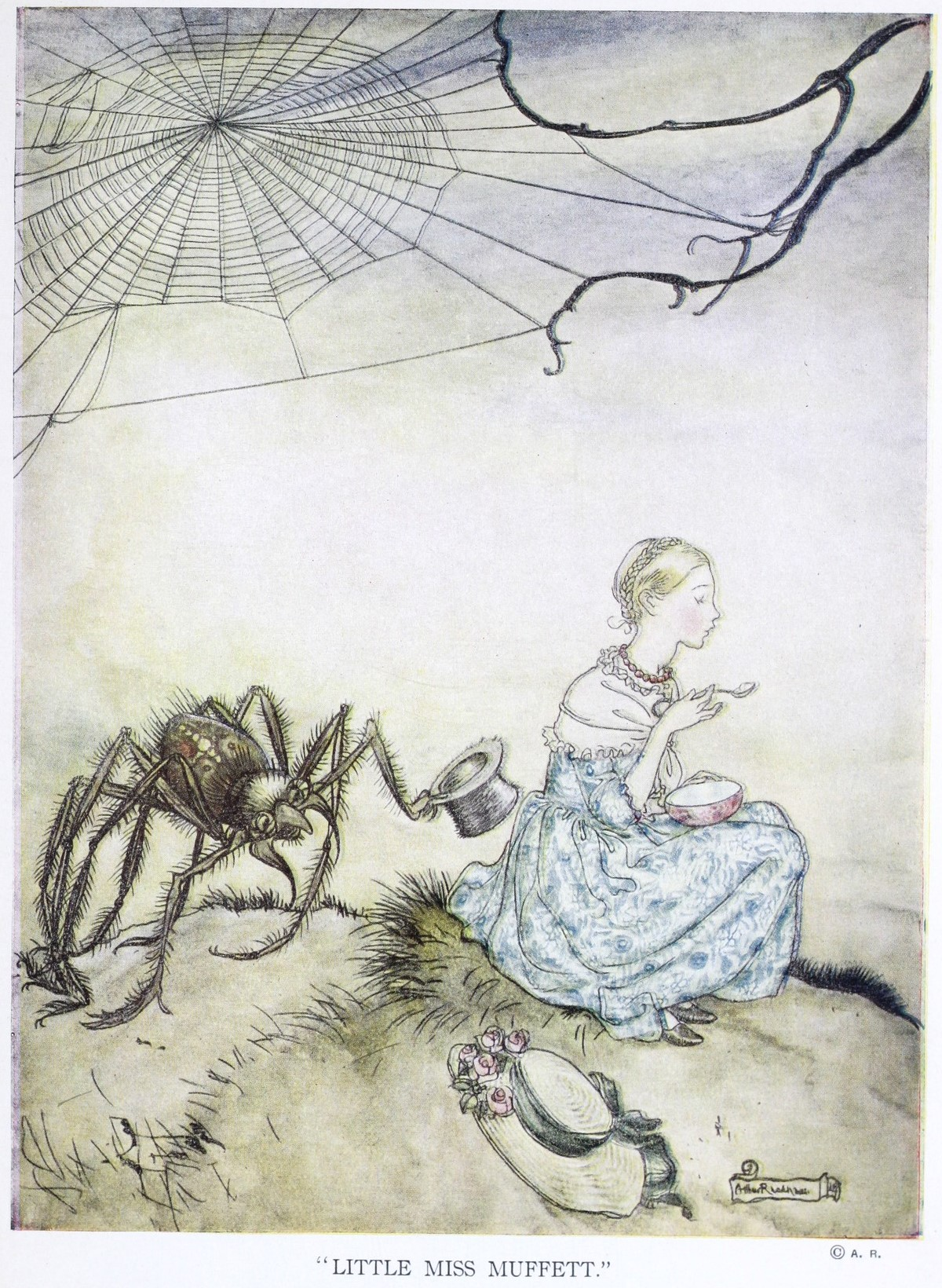
Arthur Rackham illustration, 1913

=== As a low seat ===
The Oxford English Dictionary gives a secondary definition "hassock or footstool", but calls this "doubtful". It lists an example from 1895 in which the meaning is "a three-legged stool" and another from 1904 with the meaning "footstool". Some sources, including Brewer's Dictionary of Phrase and Fable (1898) and Chambers 20th Century Dictionary (1983), failed to recognise this meaning at all, and listed only the grassy knoll definition. Nevertheless, there is a long tradition of illustrators showing some sort of low seat, including Kate Greenaway (1900) and Frederick Richardson (1915).

An 1888 variant of the rhyme has "she sat on a buffet" which the scholars Iona and Peter Opie point out certainly refers to a stool.

Tuffet as a low seat

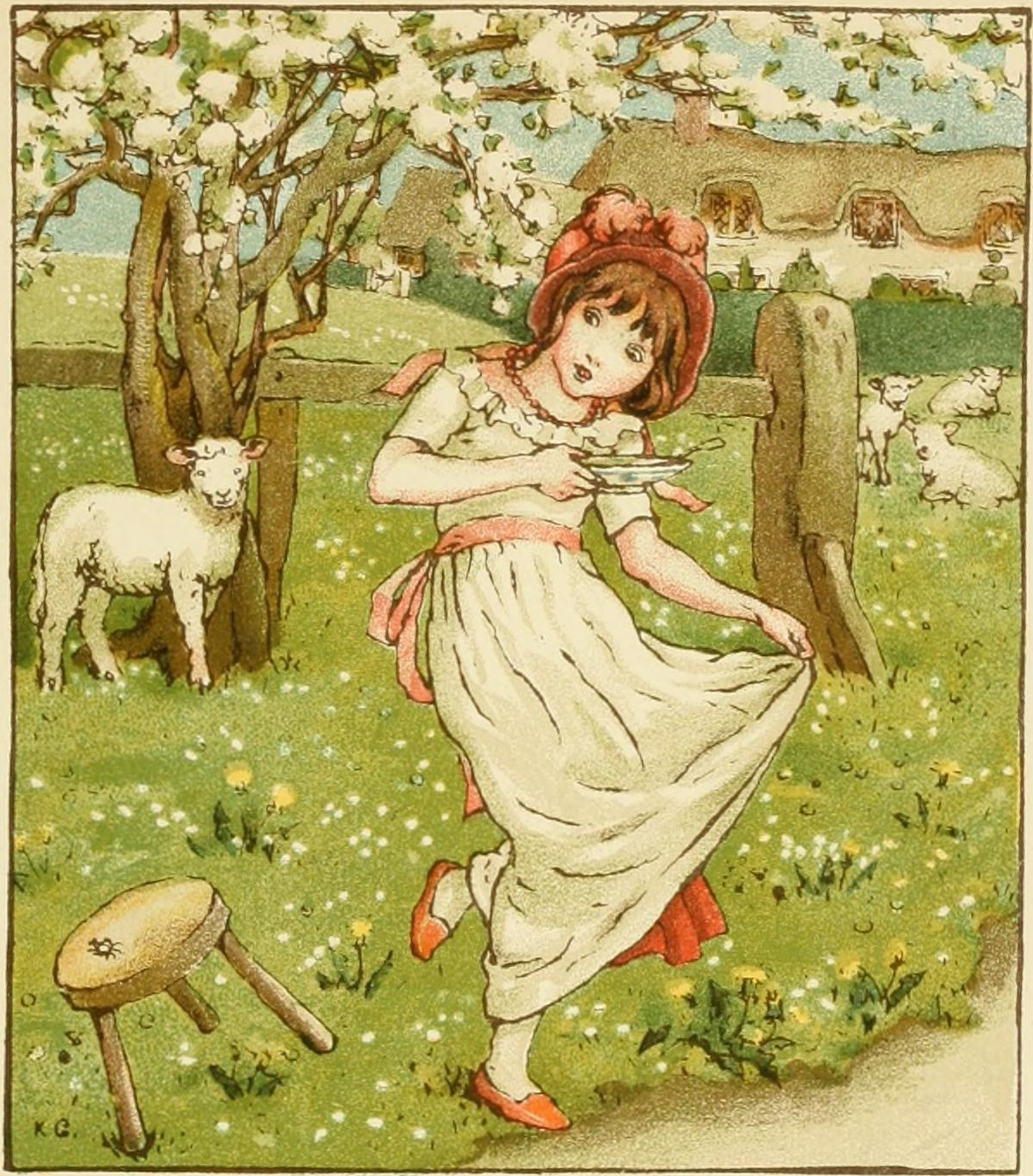
Kate Greenaway illustration, 1900

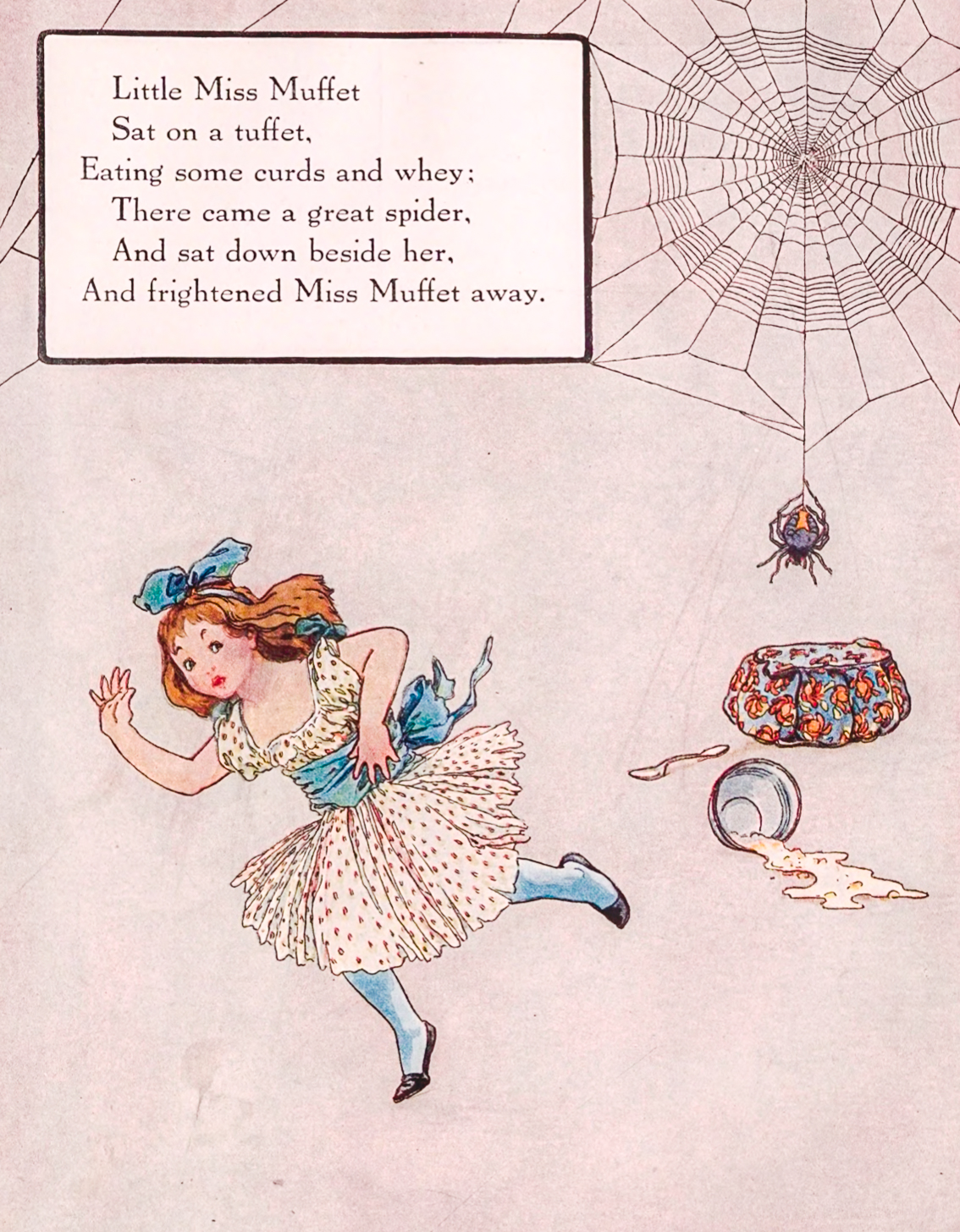
Frederick Richardson illustration, 1915

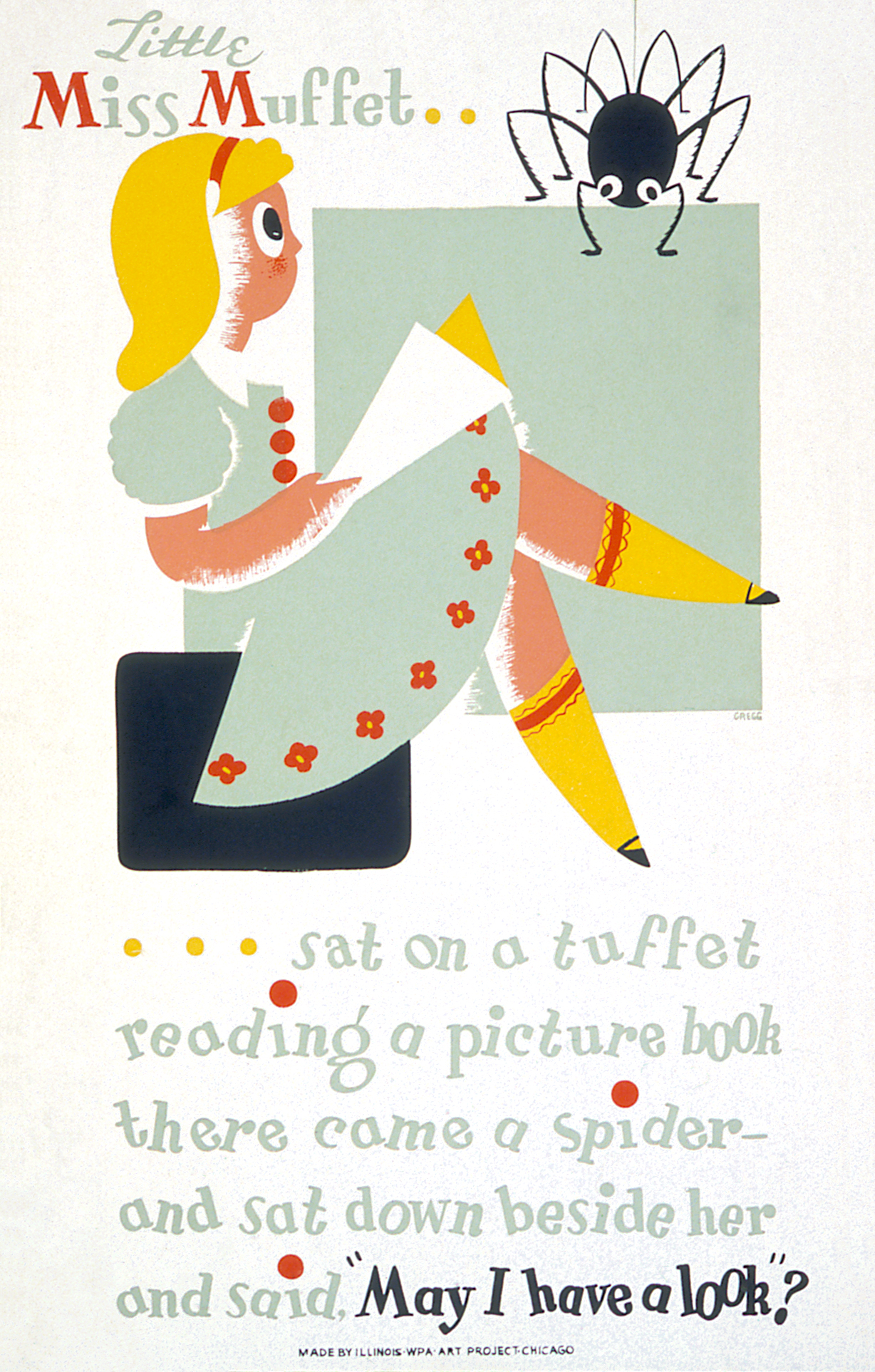
1940 poster, with parody of the rhyme

== Origins ==
The origins of the rhyme are unclear. Although no record has been found before 1805, Iona and Peter Opie argue that it is likely to be considerably older given its similarity to other rhymes such as "Little Polly Flinders", "Little Poll Parrot", "Little Tommy Tacket", "Little General Monk" and "Little Jack Horner" (the last known to have been current at least as early as 1720). It is possible that all of these rhymes, and others, are parodies of whichever unknown rhyme came first.

It is sometimes claimed – without evidence – that the original Miss Muffet was Patience, daughter of Dr Thomas Muffet (d.1604), an English physician and entomologist, but the Opies are sceptical given the two-hundred-year gap between his death and the rhyme's appearance. It has also been claimed to refer to Mary, Queen of Scots (1543–1587), frightened by the religious reformer John Knox (1510–1572).

== See also ==
- Arachnophobia
- Cultural depictions of spiders
- Itsy Bitsy Spider
