= Pussy Cat Pussy Cat =

Nursery rhyme

"Pussy Cat, Pussy Cat"

Nursery rhyme
- Published: 1805
- Songwriter: Traditional

"Pussy Cat, Pussy Cat" or "Pussycat, Pussycat" is a popular English language nursery rhyme. It has a Roud Folk Song Index number of 15094.

== Lyrics and melody ==
Common modern versions include:

Pussy cat, pussy cat, where have you been?
I've been to London to visit/look at/see the Queen/king.
Pussy cat, pussy cat, what did you do there?
I frightened a little mouse under her/the chair.

The melody commonly associated with the rhyme was first noted by the composer and nursery rhyme collector James William Elliott in his National Nursery Rhymes and Nursery Songs (1870). For the original version, there is no 'do' in 'what did you there'.

== Origins ==
The earliest record of the rhyme is publication in Songs for the Nursery, printed in London in 1805. The Queen most often depicted in illustrations is Elizabeth I, but Caroline of Brunswick has also been suggested.
