= A Wise Old Owl =

Traditional song

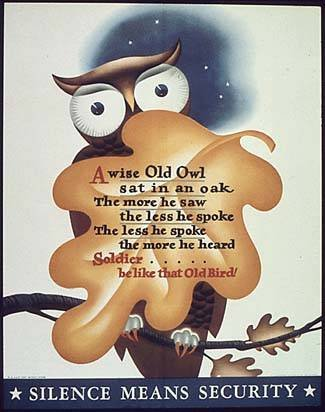
- The US wartime poster using the rhyme

Nursery rhyme
- Songwriter: Edward Hersey Richards

"A Wise Old Owl" is an English language nursery rhyme. It has a Roud Folk Song Index number of 7734 and in The Oxford Dictionary of Nursery Rhymes, 2nd Ed. of 1997, as number 394. The rhyme is an improvement of a traditional nursery rhyme "There was an owl lived in an oak, wisky, wasky, weedle."

== Lyrics ==
This version was first published in Punch, April 10, 1875, and ran as follows.

There was an owl liv'd in an oak
The more he heard, the less he spoke
The less he spoke, the more he heard.
O, if men were all like that wise bird.

One version was published upon bookmarks during the mid-1930s, and goes as follows:

A wise old owl lived in an oak,
The more he saw, the less he spoke
The less he spoke, the more he heard,
Now, wasn't he a wise old bird?

The 1875 version is ungrammatical from the standpoint of modern English, relying on an apo koinou construction for meter; this is also used in a children's song called Bingo.

== History ==
The rhyme refers to the traditional image of owls as the symbol of wisdom. It was recorded as early as 1875 and is apparently older than that. It was quoted by John D. Rockefeller in 1909 and is frequently misattributed to Edward Hersey Richards and William R. Cubbage.

During World War II, the United States Army used the rhyme on a poster with the tweaked ending, "Soldier.... be like that old bird!" with the caption "Silence means security."
