= Little Robin Redbreast =

Traditional song

Nursery rhyme
- Published: 1744
- Songwriter: Unknown

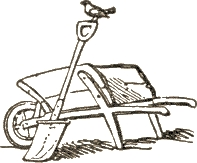
An illustration for the rhyme from The Only True Mother Goose Melodies (1833)

‘Little Robin Redbreast’ is an English language nursery rhyme, chiefly notable as evidence of the way traditional rhymes are changed and edited. It has a Roud Folk Song Index number of 20612.

== Lyrics ==
This rhyme is one of the most varied English nursery rhymes, probably because of its crude early version. Common modern versions include:

Words

Little Robin Redbreast
Sat upon a rail;
Niddle noddle went his head,
Wiggle waggle went his tail.

Fingerplay

Right hand extended in shape of a bird
poised on extended forefinger of left hand.
Little finger of right hand waggles from side to side.

Little Robin Redbreast
Came to visit me;
This is what he whistled,
Thank you for my tea.

and:

Little Robin Redbreast
Sat upon a tree,
Up went the Pussy-Cat,
And down went he;
Down came Pussy-Cat,
Away Robin ran,
Says little Robin Redbreast—
Catch me if you can.

Little Robin Redbreast jumped upon a wall,
Pussy-Cat jumped after him, and almost got a fall.
Little Robin chirped and sung, and what did pussy say?
Pussy-Cat said Mew, mew mew,—and Robin jumped away.

== Origins ==
The earliest versions of this rhyme reveal a more basic humour. The earliest recorded is from Tommy Thumb's Pretty Song Book (1744), which has the lyric:

Little Robin Red breast,
Sitting on a pole,
Niddle, Noddle,
Went his head,
And poop went his Hole.

By the late eighteenth century the last line was being rendered 'And wag went his tail,' and other variations were used in nineteenth-century children's books, in one of the clearest cases of bowdlerisation in nursery rhymes.

== Fingerplay ==
The rhyme has been used as a fingerplay. A version from 1920 included instructions with the lyrics:

Little Robin Redbreast
Sat upon a rail,
(Right hand extended in shape of a bird is poised on extended forefinger of left hand.)
Niddle noddle went his head,
And waggle went his tail.
(Little finger of right hand waggles from side to side.)
