= Polly Put the Kettle On =

Traditional song

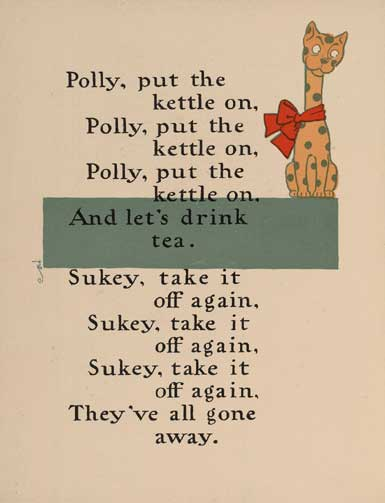
- William Wallace Denslow's illustrations for Polly Put the Kettle On, from a 1901 edition of Mother Goose

Nursery rhyme
- Published: 1803

"Polly Put the Kettle On" is an English nursery rhyme. It has a Roud Folk Song Index number of 7899.

== Lyrics ==
Common modern versions include:

Polly put the kettle on,
Polly put the kettle on,
Polly put the kettle on,
We'll all have tea.

Sukey take it off again,
Sukey take it off again,
Sukey take it off again,
They've all gone away.

== Origins ==
A song with the title: "Molly Put the Kettle On or Jenny's Baubie" was published by Joseph Dale in London in 1803. It was also printed, with "Polly" instead of "Molly" in Dublin about 1790–1810 and in New York around 1803–07. The nursery rhyme is mentioned in Charles Dickens' Barnaby Rudge (1841), which is the first record of the lyrics in their modern form.

In middle-class families in the mid-eighteenth century "Sukey" was equivalent to "Susan" and Polly was a pet-form of Mary.

The tune associated with this rhyme "Jenny's Baubie" is known to have existed since the 1770s. The melody is vaguely similar to "O du lieber Augustin", which was published in Mainz in 1788–89.
