= Farmyard Song =

Song

The "Farmyard Song" (Roud number 544) is a cumulative song about farm animals, originating in the British Isles and also known in North America.

It is known by various titles, such as:

- "I Bought Me a Cat"
- "The Green Tree"
- "The Barnyard Song"

== Summary ==
In the first verse, the narrator tells of buying or having a cat, horse or other animal, feeding them under a tree, and the call the animal makes. Each subsequent verse introduces a new animal, then repeats the calls of the animals from previous verses.

== Versions ==
There were several versions known in the Thames Valley in the early part of the 20th century. A version collected in Bampton, Oxfordshire around 1916 began as follows:

The very first thing my mother bought me,
It was a hen, you may plainly see;
And every time I fed my hen,
I fed her under the tree.

My hen went chick-chack,
My cock went cock-a-te-too;
Here's luck to all my cocks and hens,
And my cock-a-doodle-do.

Musicologists Loraine Wyman and Howard Brockway collected "The Barnyard Song" in Kentucky in 1916. This version began,

I had a cat and the cat pleased me,
I fed my cat under yonder tree.
Cat goes fiddle-i-fee.

Some American variants are not cumulative, but instead group all the animal calls together at the end of the song.

== Adaptations and recordings ==
- Aaron Copland included the song as "I Bought Me a Cat" in his 1950 song cycle, Old American Songs (part I).
- "I Went to Market", The Watersons, Green Fields (1981)
- "I Had a Cat", Rub-a-Dub-Dub, on the episode "A Wise Old Owl/I Had a Cat" (1984)
- "My Cock Crew", Con Greaney, Traditional Singer (1991)
- "Fiddle I Dee," Kidsongs' Very Silly Songs (1991)
- "Bought Me a Cat", Barney & Friends, on the episode "Down on Barney's Farm" (1992)
