= Cock a doodle doo =

Nursery rhyme

"Cock a Doodle Doo"

Nursery rhyme
- Published: 1765
- Songwriter: Traditional

"Cock a Doodle Doo" (Roud 17770) is an English nursery rhyme.

== Lyrics ==
The most common modern version is:

Cock a doodle doo!
My dame has lost her shoe,
My master's lost his fiddling stick
And knows not what to do.

== Origins ==
The first two lines were used to mock the cockerel's (rooster in North America and Oceania) "crow". The first full version recorded was in Mother Goose's Melody, published in London around 1765. By the mid-nineteenth century, when it was collected by James Orchard Halliwell, it was very popular and three additional verses, perhaps more recent in origin, had been added:

Cock a doodle doo!
What is my dame to do?
Till master's found his fiddling stick,
She'll dance without her shoe.

Cock a doodle doo!
My dame has found her shoe,
And master's found his fiddling stick,
Sing cock a doodle do!

Cock a doodle doo!
My dame will dance with you,
While master fiddles his fiddling stick,
And knows not what to do.
