= The Queen of Hearts (poem) =

Poem, 1782

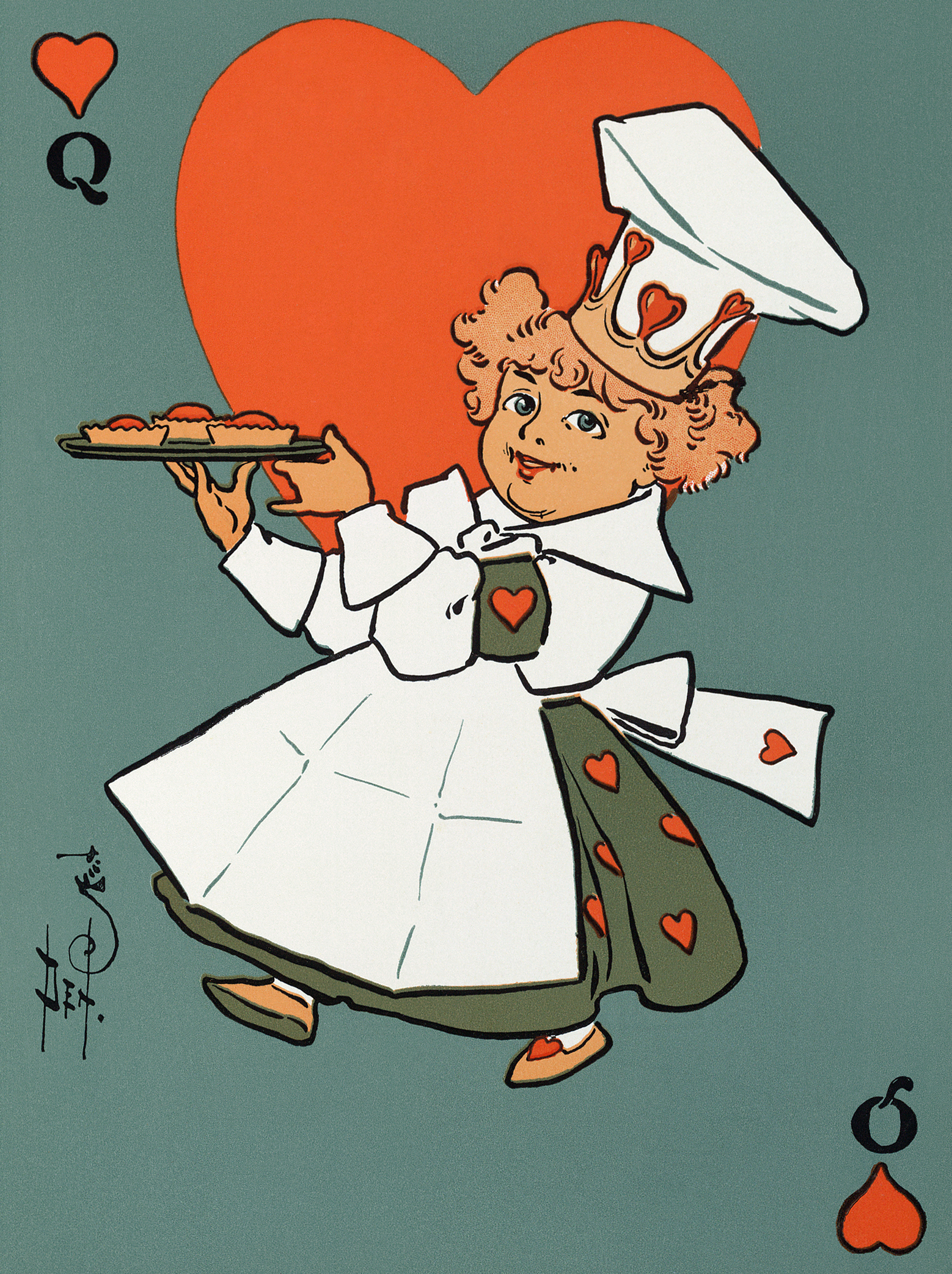
"The Queen of Hearts" from a 1901 edition of Mother Goose. Illustration by W. W. Denslow

"The Queen of Hearts" is an English poem and nursery rhyme based on the characters found on playing cards, written by an anonymous author, originally published with three lesser-known stanzas, "The King of Spades", "The King of Clubs", and "The Diamond King", in the British publication The European Magazine, vol. 1, no. 4, in April 1782. However, Iona and Peter Opie have argued that there is evidence to suggest that these other stanzas were later additions to an older poem.

== Synopsis and structure ==
The poem relates that the Queen of Hearts bakes some tart. The Knave of Hearts then steals all of them. The King of Hearts (the husband of the Queen of Hearts) calls for the tarts. He --the King-- demands the Knave must bring them back and (after the Knave brings them back) the King he beats the Knave harshly. (That is, as the line reads, "And he beat the knave full sore!".) So the Knave returns them and pledges to not steal again.

The Queen of Hearts
She made some tarts,
All on a summer's day.

The Knave of Hearts
He stole those tarts.
And he took them clean away.

The King of Hearts
Called for the tarts.
And beat the knave full sore.

The Knave of Hearts
Brought back the tarts.
And vowed he'd steal no more.

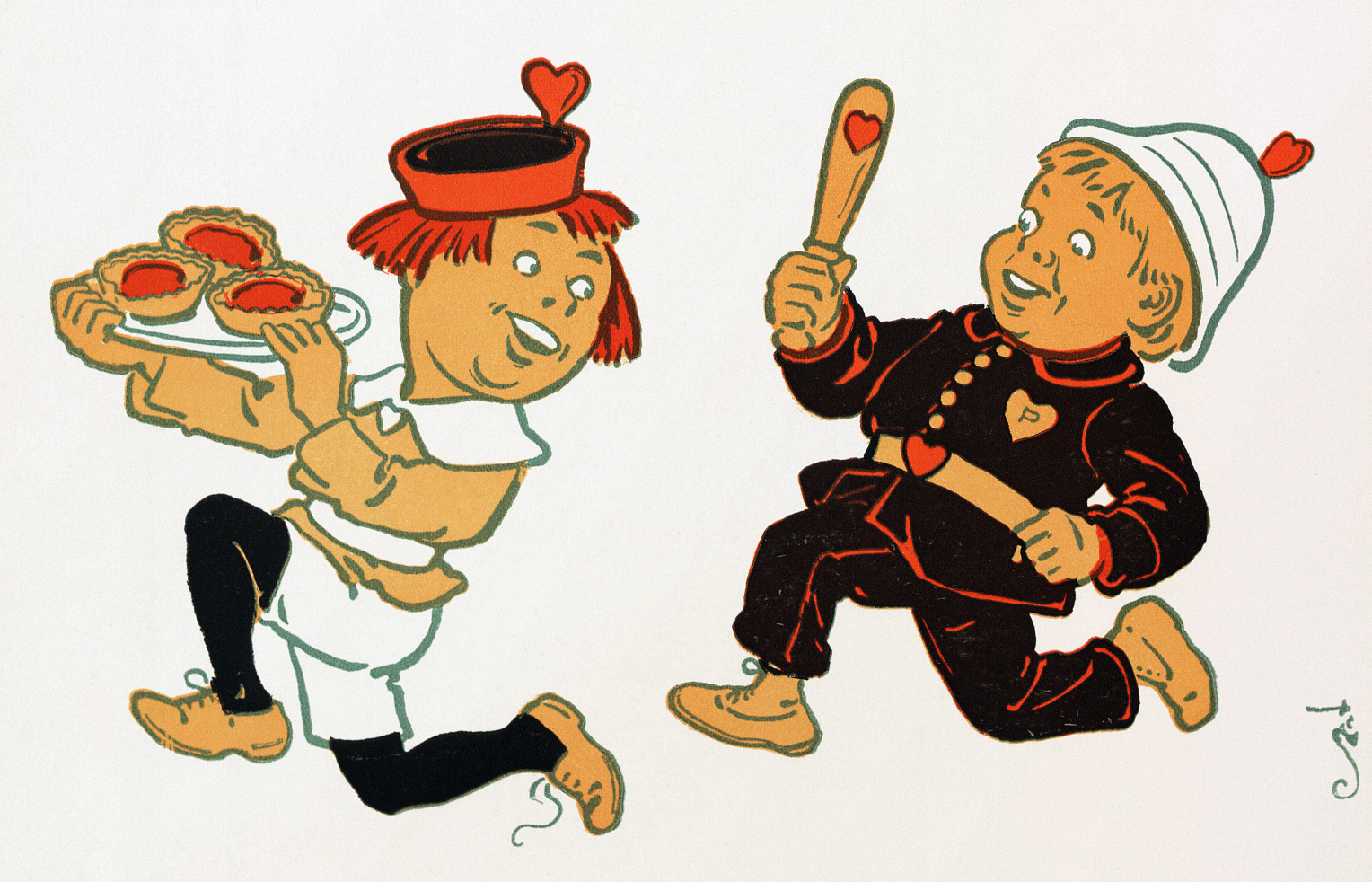
The Knave of Hearts. Illustration by W. W. Denslow.

The other stanzas published with it deal with nothing besides the domestic arrangements of the other three suits: "The King of Spades" flirts with the maids, so the Queen of Spades has them beaten and drives them out. She relents when the Knave appeals to her on their behalf. "The King of Clubs" and his wife constantly fight, but the Knave refuses to second him. The author opines that royalty who fight like that should be punished. "The Diamond King" and his wife would get along perfectly, except the Knave tries to seduce her; the author encourages the King to hang the Knave.

"The Queen of Hearts" proved by far the most popular of the stanzas, and entered popular culture, while the others fell into obscurity. Although it was originally published in a magazine for adults, it eventually became best known as a nursery rhyme. By 1785, it had been set to music.

=== Inspiration for characters ===
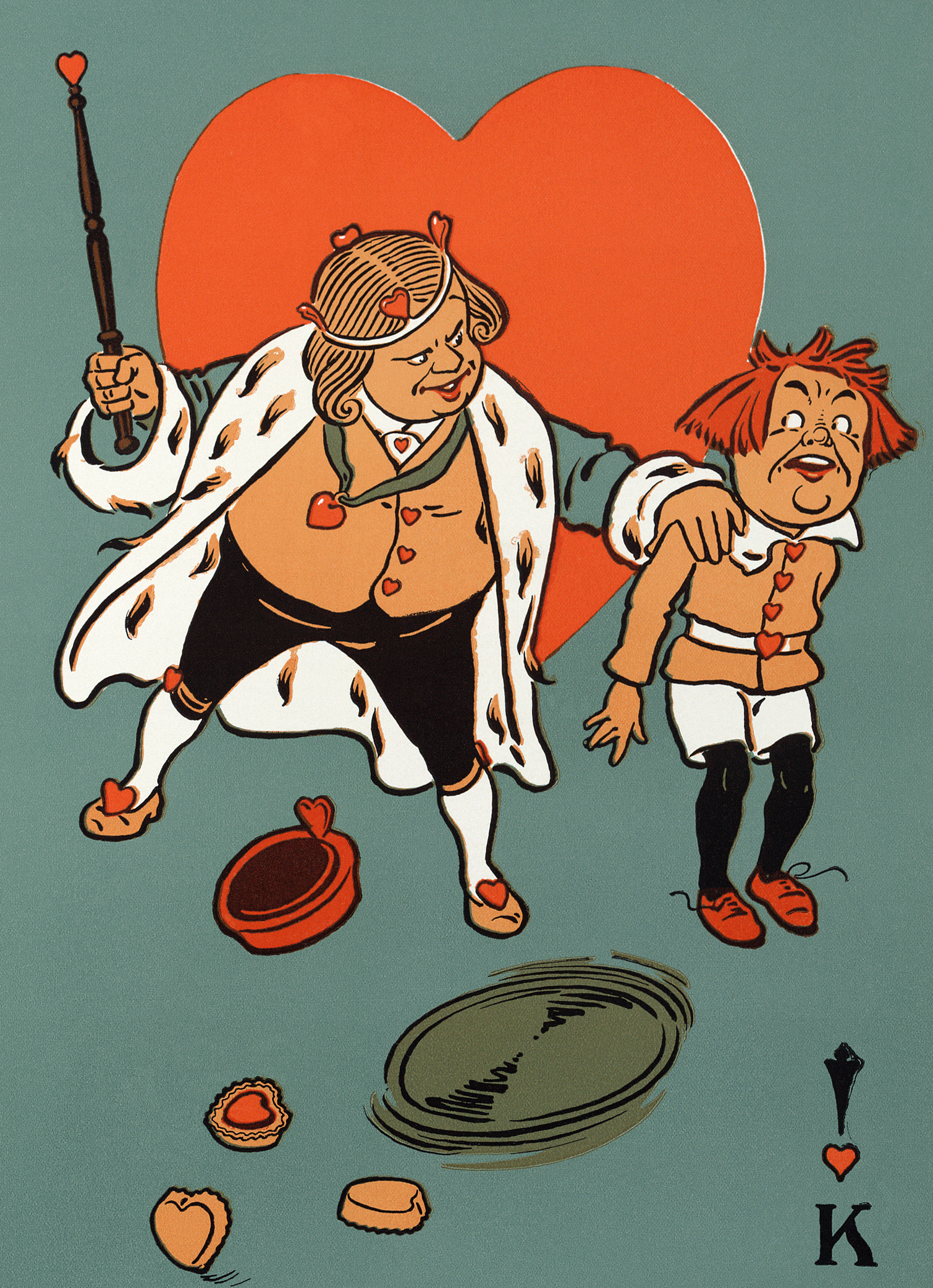
The King of Hearts. Illustration by W. W. Denslow

There has been speculation about a model for the Queen of Hearts. In The Real Personage of Mother Goose, Katherine Elwes Thomas claims the King and Queen of Hearts are based on Elizabeth of Bohemia and the events that resulted in the outbreak of the Thirty Years War. W. Gurney Benham, in his book Playing Cards: History of the Pack and Explanations of its Many Secrets, notes that French playing cards from the mid-17th century have Judith from the Hebrew Bible as the Queen of Hearts. However, according to Benham, a scholar who researched the history of playing cards: "The old nursery rhyme about the Knave of Hearts who stole the tarts and was beaten for so doing by the King, seems to be founded on nothing more than the fact that 'hearts' rhymes with 'tarts'."

== Adaptations ==
The poem's story is retold in a much expanded form in an 1805 poem known as King and Queen of Hearts: with the Rogueries of the Knave who stole the Queen's Pies by Charles Lamb, which gives each line of the original, followed by a poem commenting on the line. In 1844 Halliwell included the poem in the 3rd Edition of his The Nursery Rhymes of England (though he dropped it from later editions) and Caldecott made it the subject of one of his 1881 "Picture Books", a series of illustrated nursery rhymes which he normally issued in pairs before Christmas from 1878 until his death in 1886.

"The Queen of Hearts" is quoted in and forms the basis for the plot of Lewis Carroll's Alice's Adventures in Wonderland, Chapter XI: "Who Stole the Tarts?", a chapter that lampoons the British legal system through means of the trial of the Knave of Hearts, where the rhyme is presented as evidence. The poem became more popular after its inclusion in Carroll's work.
