= Tommy Thumb's Pretty Song Book =

Anthology of English nursery rhymes

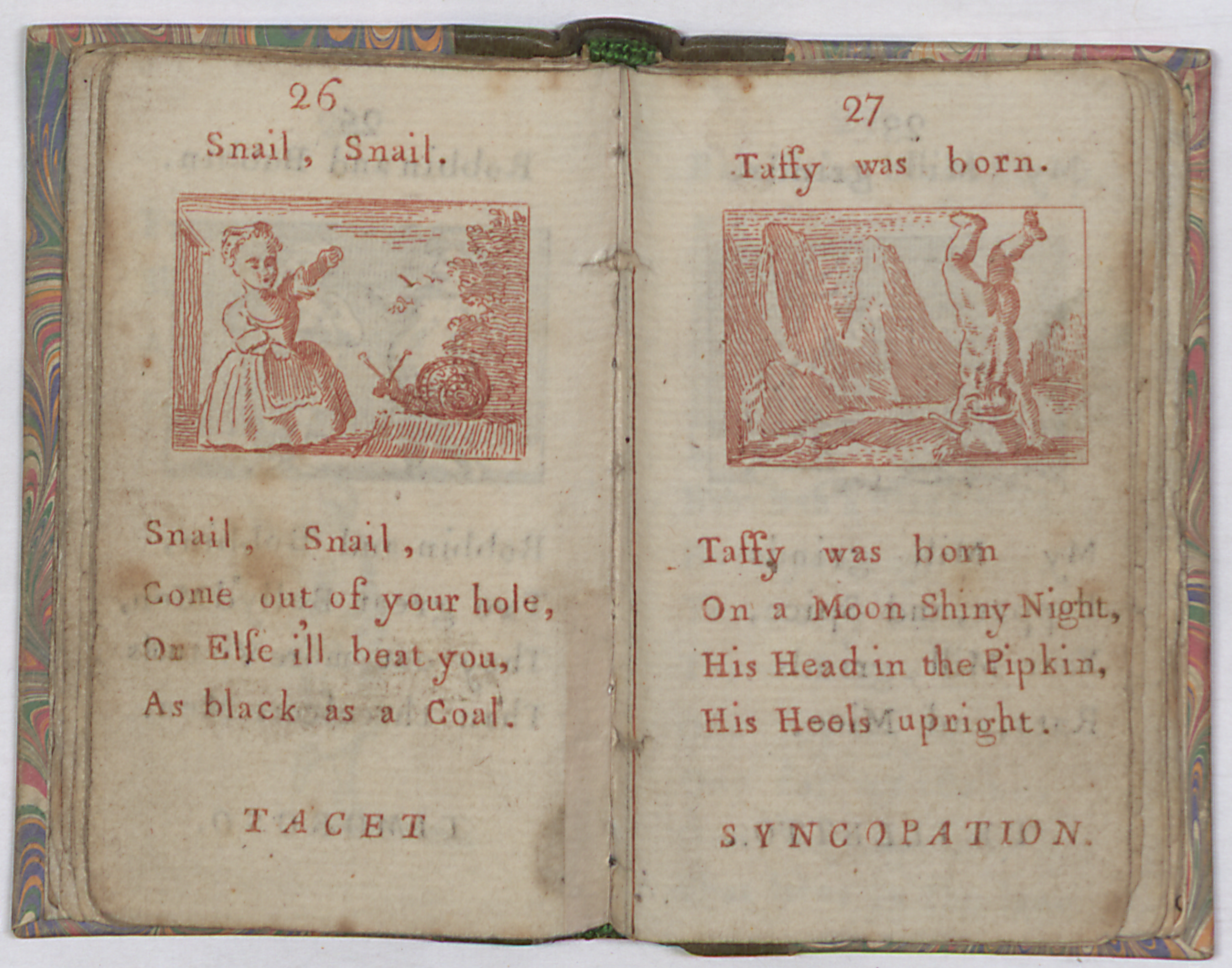
scan of Tommy Thumb's pretty song book

Tommy Thumb's Pretty Song-Book is the earliest extant anthology of English nursery rhymes, published in London in 1744. It contains the earliest printed texts of many well-known and popular rhymes, as well as several that eventually dropped out of the canon of rhymes for children.

== History ==
Tommy Thumb's Pretty Song Book was published in London by Mary Cooper in May, 1744. It was originally a sequel to a now-lost first volume published earlier that year. The rhymes and illustrations were printed from copper plates, the text being stamped with punches into the plates, a technique borrowed from map and music printing. The book measures 3×13/4 inches and it is printed in alternate openings in red and black ink.

For many years, it was thought that there was only a single copy in existence, now in the British Library. However, another copy appeared in 2001, which was sold for £45,000 and is now in the collection of the Cotsen Children's Library. In 2013 a facsimile edition with an introduction by Andrea Immel and Brian Alderson was published by the Cotsen Occasional Press.

The two extant copies of Tommy Thumb's Pretty Song-Book are the oldest printed collections of English nursery rhymes known to still exist. Although Tommy Thumb's Song Book is an older collection, no copies of its first printing have survived. The only other printed copies of nursery rhymes that predate the Pretty Song-Book are in the form of quotations and allusions, such as the half-dozen or so that appear in Henry Carey's 1725 satire on Ambrose Philips, Namby Pamby.

== Contents ==
The book contains forty nursery rhymes, many of which are still popular, including;

- Baa Baa Black Sheep
- Girls and Boys Come Out To Play
- Hickory Dickory Dock
- Ladybird Ladybird
- Little Robin Redbreast
- Little Tommy Tucker
- London Bridge is Falling Down
- Mary Mary Quite Contrary
- Oranges and Lemons
- Ride a Cock Horse to Banbury Cross
- Sing a Song of Sixpence
- There Was an Old Woman Who Lived Under a Hill
- Who Killed Cock Robin?

There are also a number of less familiar rhymes, some of which were probably unsuitable for later sensibilities, including:

Piss a Bed,
Piss a Bed,
Barley Butt,
Your Bum is so heavy,
You can't get up.

Another one is:

My Mill grinds
Pepper, and Spice,
Your Mill grinds
Rats, and Mice.

Some nursery rhymes turn up in disguise:

The Moon shines Bright,
The Stars give a light,
And you may kiss
A pretty girl
At ten a clock at night.

This is an earlier version of:

When I was a little boy

My mammy kept me in,

Now I am a great boy,

I'm fit to serve the king.

I can handle a musket,

And I can smoke a pipe.

And I can kiss a pretty girl

At twelve o'clock at night.
