= Girls and Boys Come Out to Play =

Nursery rhyme

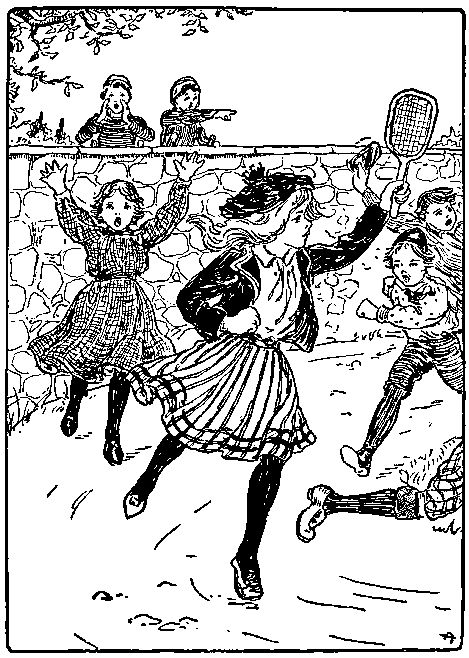
An illustration of boys and girls playing

"Girls and Boys Come Out to Play" or "Boys and Girls Come Out to Play" is a folk song that has existed since at least 1708. It has a Roud Folk Song Index number of 5452.

== Lyrics ==
The most common versions of the rhyme are very similar to that collected by James Orchard Halliwell in the mid-nineteenth century:

Girls and boys, come out to play,
The moon doth shine as bright as day;
Leave your supper, and leave your sleep,
And come with your playfellows into the street.

Come with a whoop, come with a call,
Come with a good will or not at all.
Up the ladder and down the wall,
A halfpenny roll will serve us all.

You find milk, and I'll find flour,
And we'll have a pudding in half an hour.

Other versions often put boys before girls in the opening line.

Here is the melody for the first two lines.

== History ==
The verse may date back to the time when children were expected to work during the daylight hours, and play was reserved for late in the evening. The first two lines at least appeared in dance books (1708, 1719, 1728), satires (1709, 1725), and a political broadside (1711). It appeared in the earliest extant collection of nursery rhymes, Tommy Thumb's Pretty Song Book, published in London around 1744. The 1744 version included the first six lines.
