= Little Bo-Peep =

English nursery rhyme

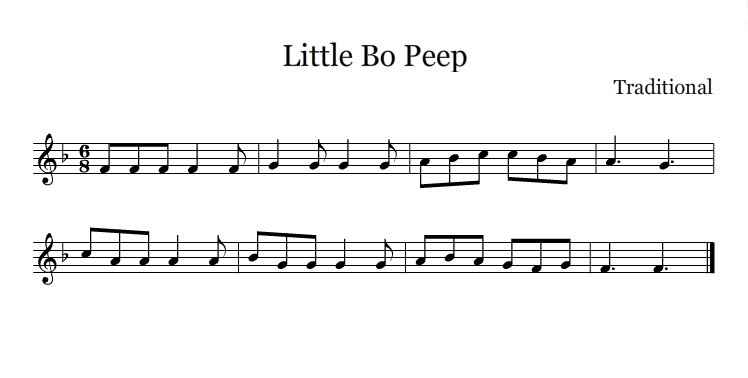
- Sheet music

Nursery rhyme
- Published: c. 1805
- Songwriter: Unknown

"Little Bo-Peep" or "Little Bo-Peep has lost her sheep" is an English language nursery rhyme. It has a Roud Folk Song Index number of 6487.

== Words and melody ==
Little Bo-Peep
Main melody for "Little Bo-Peep"

As with most products of oral tradition, there are many variations to the rhyme. One modern version of the first verse is:

Little Bo-Peep has lost her sheep
And doesn't know where to find them.
Leave them alone and they'll come home,
Bringing their tails behind them.

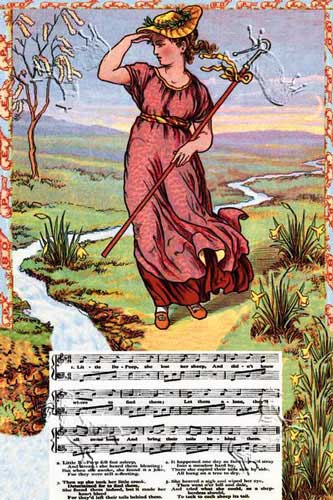
Little Bo-Peep, by Walter Crane, c. 1885

Variants of the second line include "And can't tell where to find them", with the fourth line sometimes being given as "And bring their tails behind them".

The melody commonly associated with the rhyme was first recorded in 1870 by the composer and nursery rhyme collector James William Elliott in his National Nursery Rhymes and Nursery Songs.

== Additional verses ==
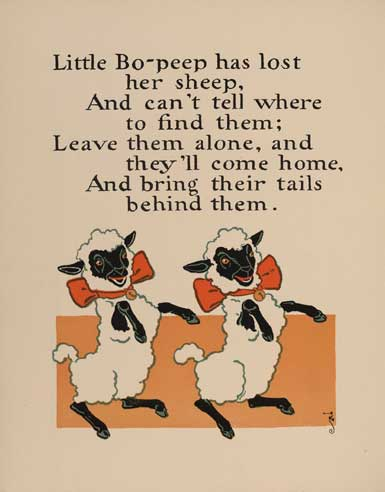
William Wallace Denslow's illustrations for the rhyme, 1902

The rhyme continues:

Little Bo-peep fell fast asleep,
And dreamt she heard them bleating;
But when she awoke, she found it a joke,
For they were still all fleeting.

Then up she took her little crook,
Determined for to find them;
She found them indeed, but it made her heart bleed,
For they'd left their tails behind them.

It happened one day, as Bo-Peep did stray
Into a meadow hard by,
There she espied their tails side by side,
All hung on a tree to dry.

She heaved a sigh, and wiped her eye,
And over the hillocks went rambling,
And tried what she could, as a shepherdess should,
To tack each again to its lambkin.

This is an allusion of the common practice of docking lambs' tails.

== Origins and history ==
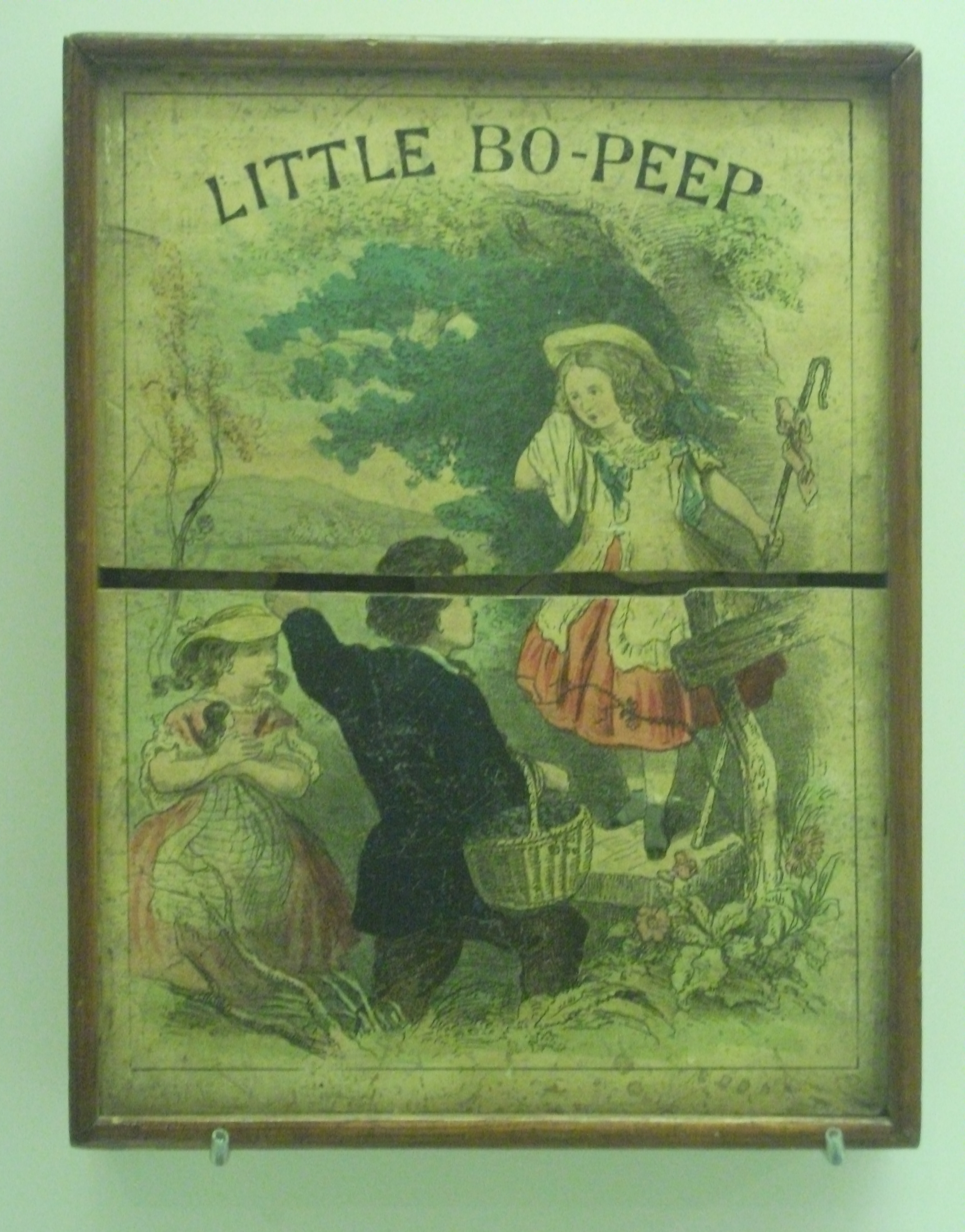
19th century educational game

The earliest record of this rhyme is in a manuscript of around 1805, which contains only the first verse which references the adult Bo Peep, called 'Little' because she was short and not because she was young. There are references to a children's game called "bo-peep", from the 16th century, including one in Shakespeare's King Lear (Act I Scene iv), for which "bo-peep" is thought to refer to the children's game of peek-a-boo, but there's no evidence that the rhyme existed earlier than the 18th century. The additional verses are first recorded in the earliest printed version in a version of Gammer Gurton's Garland or The Nursery Parnassus in 1810, published in London by Joseph Johnson.

The phrase "to play bo peep" was in use from the 14th century to refer to the punishment of being stood in a pillory. For example, in 1364, an alewife, Alice Causton, was convicted of giving short measure, for which crime she had to "play bo peep thorowe a pillery". (Note: That is, "[…] through a pillory") Andrew Boorde uses the same phrase in 1542:

"And evyll bakers, the which doth nat make good breade of whete, but wyl myngle other corne with whete, or do nat order and season hit, gyving good wegght, I would they myghte play bo peep throwe a pyllery."

And evil bakers—those who do not make good bread from wheat, but instead mingle other grains with wheat, or do not sort and season it, giving it a good weight—I wish they could play bo-peep through a pillory.

Nevertheless, connections with sheep are early; a fifteenth-century ballad includes the lines: "Halfe England ys nowght now but shepe (Note: "Half of England is now nothing but sheep") // In every corner they play boe-peep".
