= Mary, Mary, Quite Contrary =

English nursery rhyme

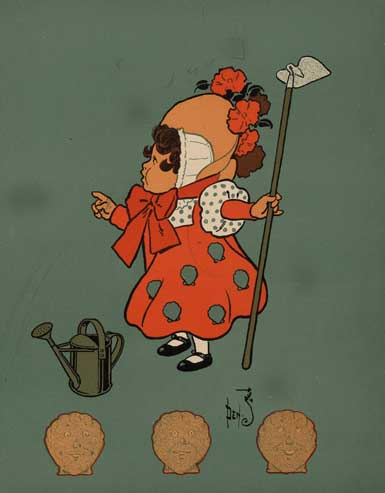
- Illustration by William Wallace Denslow

Nursery rhyme
- Published: c. 1745

"Mary, Mary, Quite Contrary" is an English nursery rhyme. The rhyme has been seen as having religious and historical significance, but its origins and meaning are disputed. It has a Roud Folk Song Index number of 19626.

== Lyrics ==
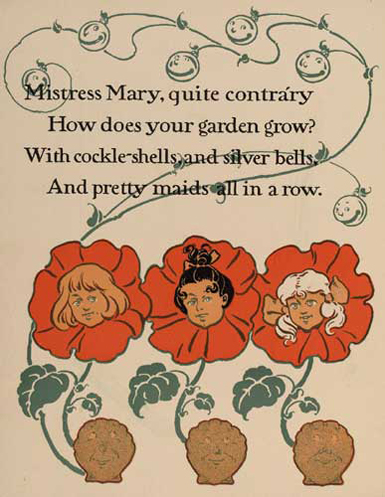
William Wallace Denslow's rendition of the poem, 1901

The most common modern version is:

Mary, Mary, quite contrary,
How does your garden grow?
With silver bells, and cockle shells,
And pretty maids all in a row.

The oldest known version was first published in Tommy Thumb's Pretty Song Book (1745) with the lyrics that are shown here:

Mary, Mary, Quite contrary,
How does your garden grow?
With Silver Bells, And Cockle Shells,
Pretty maids all in a row.

There is also a version in The Secret Garden (1911) written by Frances Hodgson Burnett with these lyrics:

Mistress Mary, Quite Contrary,
How does your garden grow?
With Silver Bells and Cockles Shells
And Marigolds all in a row.

Several printed versions of the 18th century have the lyrics:

Mistress Mary, Quite contrary,
How does your garden grow?
With Silver Bells, And Cockle Shells,
Sing cuckolds all in a row.

The last line has the most variation including:

Cowslips all in a row [sic].

and

With lady bells all in a row.

== Meaning ==
No proof has been found that the rhyme was known before the 18th century, while Mary I of England (Mary Tudor) and Mary, Queen of Scots (Mary Stuart), were contemporaries in the 16th century.

Like many nursery rhymes, it has acquired various historical explanations. One theory is that it is a religious allegory of Catholicism, with Mary being Mary, the mother of Jesus, bells representing the sanctus bells, the cockleshells the badges of the pilgrims to the shrine of Saint James in Santiago de Compostela, Spain, and pretty maids are nuns, but even within this strand of thought there are differences of opinion as to whether it is lament for the reinstatement of Catholicism or its persecution. Another theory sees the rhyme as connected to Mary, Queen of Scots (1542–1587), with "how does your garden grow" referring to her reign over her realm, "silver bells" referring to (Catholic) cathedral bells, "cockle shells" insinuating that her husband was not faithful to her, and "pretty maids all in a row" referring to her ladies-in-waiting – "The four Maries".

Mary has also been identified with Mary I of England (1516–58), with "How does your garden grow?" said to refer to her lack of heirs, or to the common idea that England had become a Catholic vassal or "branch" of Spain and the Habsburgs. It is also said to be a punning reference to her chief minister, Stephen Gardiner. "Quite contrary" is said to be a reference to her unsuccessful attempt to reverse ecclesiastical changes effected by her father Henry VIII and her brother Edward VI. The "pretty maids all in a row" is speculated to be a reference to miscarriages, her execution of Lady Jane Grey, or alternately to her executions of the Protestants.
