= Sing a Song of Sixpence =

English nursery rhyme

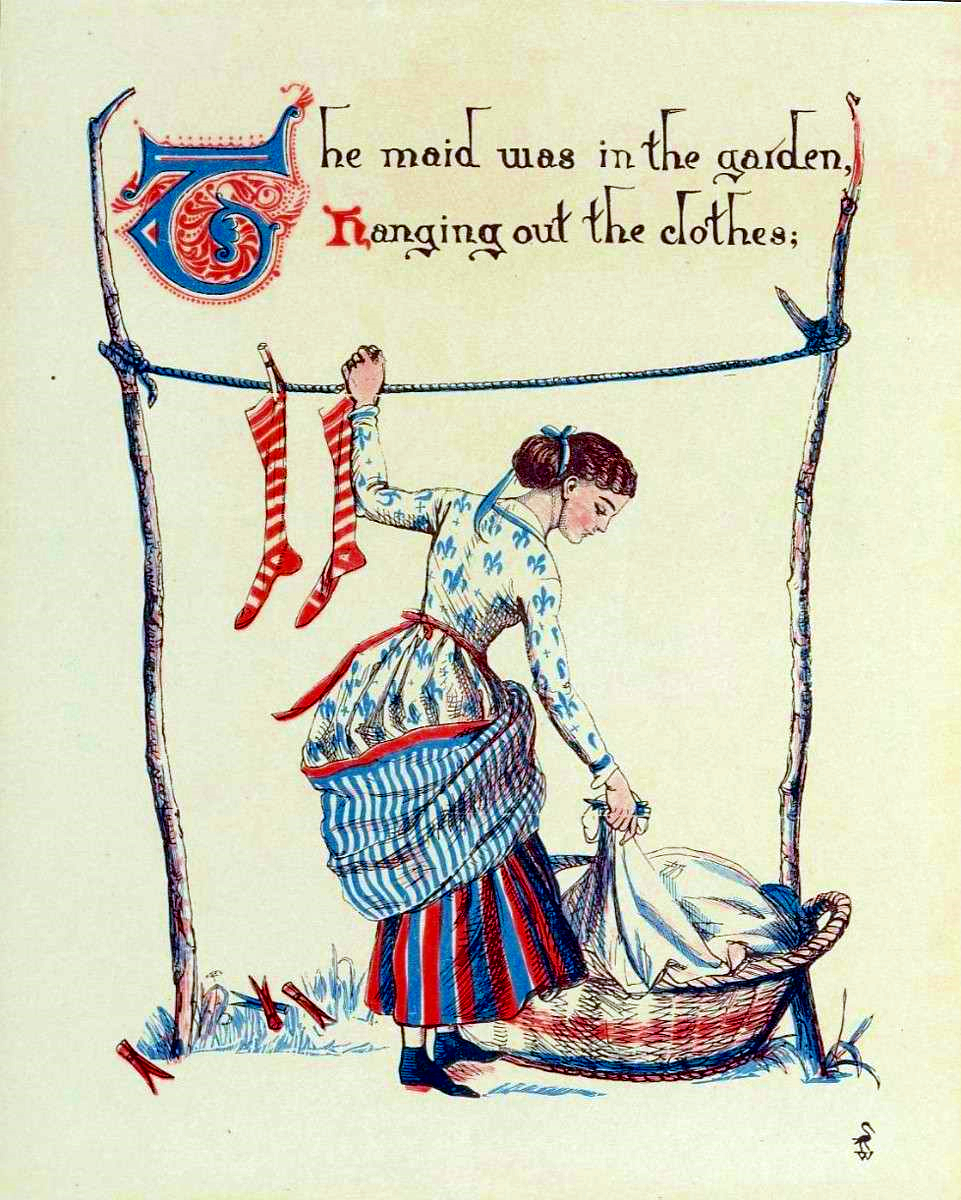
- Walter Crane's 1864 illustration of the maid hanging out the clothes

Nursery rhyme
- Published: c. 1744
- Songwriter: Traditional

"Sing a Song of Sixpence" is an English nursery rhyme, perhaps originating in the 18th century. It is listed in the Roud Folk Song Index as number 13191. The sixpence in the rhyme is a British coin that was first minted in 1551 and became obsolete in 1980 after the country's transition to the decimal currency system in 1971.

== Origins ==
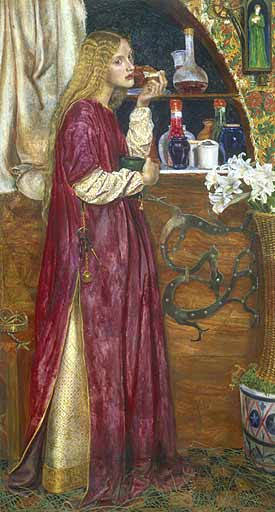
The Queen Was in the Parlour, Eating Bread and Honey, by Valentine Cameron Prinsep.

The rhyme's origins are uncertain. References have been inferred in Shakespeare's Twelfth Night (c. 1602), (Twelfth Night 2.3/32–33), where Sir Toby Belch tells a clown: "Come on; there is sixpence for you: let's have a song" and in Beaumont and Fletcher's 1614 play Bonduca, which contains the line "Whoa, here's a stir now! Sing a song o' sixpence!"

In the past it has often been attributed to George Steevens (1736–1800), who used it in a pun at the expense of Poet Laureate Henry James Pye (1745–1813) in 1790, but the first verse had already appeared in print in Tommy Thumb's Pretty Song Book, published in London around 1744, in the form:

Sing a Song of Sixpence,
A bag full of Rye,
Four and twenty Naughty Boys,
Baked in a Pye.

The next printed version that survives, from around 1780, has two verses and the boys have been replaced by birds. A version of the modern four verses is first extant in Gammer Gurton's Garland or The Nursery Parnassus published in 1784, which ends with a magpie attacking the unfortunate maid. Fifth verses with the happier endings began to be added from the middle of the 19th century.

== Lyrics ==
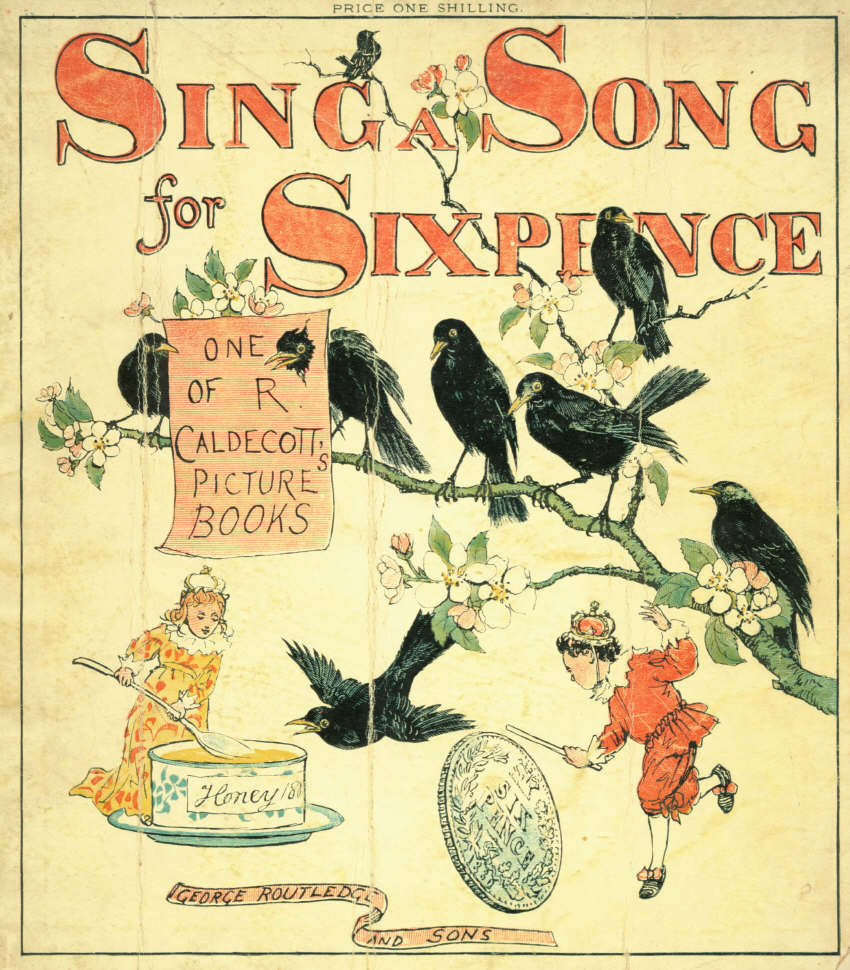
Cover illustration for Randolph Caldecott's Sing a Song for Sixpence (1880)

A common modern version is:

Sing a song of sixpence,
A pocket full of rye.
Four and twenty blackbirds
Baked in a pie.

When the pie was opened,
The birds began to sing.
Wasn't that a dainty (or dandy) dish
To set before the king?

The king was in his counting house,
Counting out his money.
The queen was in the parlour,
Eating bread and honey.

The maid was in the garden,
Hanging out the clothes,
When down came a blackbird
And pecked off her nose.

The fifth and final verse—usually sung after the fourth verse—is sometimes slightly varied (after the blackbird "pecked off" the maid's nose). One of the following additional verses is often added to moderate the ending:

They sent for the king's doctor,
Who sewed it on again.
He sewed it on so neatly,
The seam was never seen.

or:

There was such a commotion,
That little Jenny wren
Flew down into the garden,
And put it back again.

In the 1988 comedy hit single Loadsamoney, about the money-obsessed character of the same name, the British comedian Harry Enfield concludes the song with a humorous reference to the Sing a Song of Sixpence poem, in this case changed into a rhyme about money.

== Melody ==
=== Version 1 ===
This may be the most well-known version in Britain and the Commonwealth.

=== Version 2 ===
This version may be well known in the United States.

== Meaning and interpretations ==
Many interpretations have been placed on this rhyme. It is known that a 16th-century amusement was to place live birds in a pie, as a form of entremet. (Note: Or "subtlety", an elaborate form of dish common in Europe, particularly England and France, during the late Middle Ages.) An Italian cookbook from 1549 (translated into English in 1598) contained such a recipe: "to make pies so that birds may be alive in them and fly out when it is cut up" and this was referred to in a cook book of 1725 by John Nott. The wedding of Marie de' Medici and Henry IV of France in 1600 contains some interesting parallels. "The first surprise, though, came shortly before the starter—when the guests sat down, unfolded their napkins and saw songbirds fly out. The highlight of the meal was sherbets of milk and honey, which were created by Buontalenti."

In their 1951 The Oxford Dictionary of Nursery Rhymes, Iona and Peter Opie write that the rhyme has been tied to a variety of historical events or folklorish symbols such as the queen symbolizing the moon, the king the sun, and the blackbirds the number of hours in a day; or, as the authors indicate, the blackbirds have been seen as an allusion to monks during the period of the Dissolution of the Monasteries by Henry VIII, with Catherine of Aragon representing the queen, and Anne Boleyn the maid. The rye and the birds have been seen to represent a tribute sent to Henry VII, and on another level, the term "pocketful of rye" may in fact refer to an older term of measurement. The number 24 has been tied to the Reformation and the printing of the English Bible with 24 letters. From a folklorish tradition, the blackbird taking the maid's nose has been seen as a demon stealing her soul.

No corroborative evidence has been found to support these theories and, given that the earliest version has only one stanza and mentions "naughty boys" and not blackbirds, some of these meanings would not have been original unless it is assumed that more recently printed versions accurately preserve an older tradition.

Although there is no interpretation that is proven as true, there is one that is explicitly proven false. That one is the story that Blackbeard the pirate created "Sing a Song of Sixpence" with its lyrics as a code to recruit crew for his pirate ship. Blackbeard had nothing to do with the song. This story was created in 1999 by the website Snopes (which normally proves or debunks urban legends) as part of a series of fabricated urban legends known as "The Repository of Lost Legends" (whose initials read "TROLL") as red herrings to test people's common sense with an outlandish story. All the Lost Legends are fictional and the Lost Legend about "Sing a Song of Sixpence" is no exception.

In this deliberate misinterpretation of "Sing a Song of Sixpence" and its lyrics, the "Sixpence" referred to a Sixpence coin (a decent amount of money in Blackbeard's time) and the "pocketful of rye" was a bag ("pocket") with whiskey ("rye", one of the ingredients of whiskey) that captain Blackbeard gave to each pirate in his crew as a salary every day. The "blackbirds" were pirates who work for Blackbeard and their being "Baked in a pie" is the pirates setting up a ruse to raid a nearby ship and capture it. The pie opening and the birds singing refers to the end of the ruse and the start of the raid on the nearby ship. The "dainty dish" was the ship that was easily captured by the pirates after the raid and the "king" in both instances in the song refers to Blackbeard himself. The lyrics "The king was in his counting house, Counting out his money" was about how Blackbeard was wealthy enough to pay his crew their daily sixpence and whiskey salary regardless if they captured ships that day or not. The Snopes page claims that this was especially attractive to pirates because as most pirate captains did not pay salaries and pirate raids were often unsuccessful, it was a common occurrence that pirate ships were forced to return to shore after several months due to lack of funds. The "Queen" mentioned was in fact Blackbeard's ship, called Queen Anne's Revenge and the mention of the queen "Eating bread and honey" is Queen Anne's Revenge taking in supplies at port to prepare for a cruise. The "maid" is a prize ship (a ship specifically chosen to get raided), the "garden" is the Caribbean Sea (where Blackbeard and his crew carried out their raids) and the "clothes" are the prize ship's sails. The mention of another "blackbird" pecking the maid's nose from her face is Blackbeard bragging about his plans to raid the prize ship. The version of "Sing a Song of Sixpence" on Snopes does not have any verse where the maid's nose is reattached to her face. Every Lost Legend had a link to a page explaining that it was fictional and the reason for posting it.

In 2003, the TV series Mostly True Stories?: Urban Legends Revealed used this story as a true or false question before a commercial break when it asked "Was the nursery rhyme 'Sing a Song of Sixpence' used as a code to recruit pirates?". After the break, the show mistakenly claimed it was "true" and mentioned its supposed connection to Blackbeard, implying that Snopes was used by the show's producers as a source. Snopes then posted a page about the mistake on their "Media goofs" section noting that whoever made the show apparently did not see the explanation and had fallen for a story that was fictional. In later airings of the episode, the answer was corrected to say that the Blackbeard connection was "false" with Snopes' page on Mostly True Stories? edited to note the correction. According to Snopes, no public statement was made about the mistake by the show's producers.

== See also ==
- Pop out cake
- Four-and-Twenty, a racehorse.
