= James Halliwell-Phillipps =

English scholar and antiquarian (1820–1889)

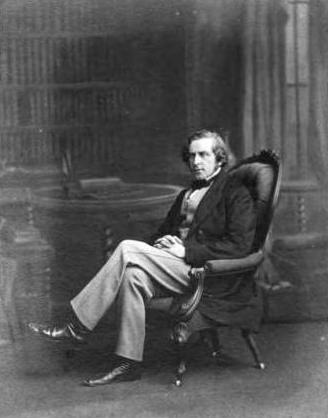
- Halliwell in 1863
- Born: James Orchard Halliwell; 21 June 1820; London, England
- Died: 3 January 1889 (aged 68); East Sussex, England
- Resting place: All Saints Church, Patcham; 50°51′59.77″N 0°9′2.54″W
- Education: Jesus College, Cambridge
- Occupations: Writer; scholar
- Known for: Writing on William Shakespeare
- Relatives: Thomas Phillipps (father-in-law)

James Orchard Halliwell-Phillipps (born James Orchard Halliwell; 21 June 1820 – 3 January 1889) was an English writer, Shakespearean scholar, antiquarian, and a collector of English nursery rhymes and fairy tales.

== Life ==
The son of Thomas Halliwell, a wealthy draper from Chorley Lancashire, he was born at Sloane Street, Chelsea, London and was educated privately and at Jesus College, Cambridge. He devoted himself to antiquarian research, particularly of early English literature. Beginning at the age of 16, between 1836 and 1837, he contributed 47 articles to The Parthenon. A Weekly Journal of English and Foreign Literature, the Arts, and Sciences; in 1839 he edited Sir John Mandeville's Travels; in 1842 he published an Account of the European manuscripts in the Chetham Library, besides a newly discovered metrical romance of the 15th century (Torrent of Portugal).

In 1841, while still a student at Cambridge, Halliwell dedicated his book Reliquae Antiquae to Sir Thomas Phillipps, the noted bibliomaniac. Phillipps invited Halliwell to stay at his estate, Middle Hill. There Halliwell met Phillipps's daughter, Henrietta, to whom he soon proposed marriage. However, also around this time, Halliwell was accused of stealing manuscripts from Trinity College, Cambridge. Although no prosecution was brought, Phillipps's suspicions were aroused and he refused to consent to the marriage. This led to the couple's elopement in 1842. Phillipps refused ever to see his daughter or Halliwell again. Despite this, the marriage seems to have been a long and happy one with Henrietta providing valuable support for his scholarly work.

In 1842, Halliwell published the first edition of Nursery Rhymes of England followed by Nursery Rhymes and Nursery Tales, containing the first printed version of the Three Little Pigs and a version of the Christmas carol The Twelve Days of Christmas.

From 1845, Halliwell was excluded from the library of the British Museum on account of the suspicion concerning his possession of some manuscripts which had been removed from the library of Trinity College, Cambridge. He published privately an explanation of the matter in 1845. Halliwell also had a habit, detested by bibliophiles, of cutting up seventeenth-century books and pasting parts he liked into scrapbooks. During his life he destroyed 800 books and made 3,600 scraps.

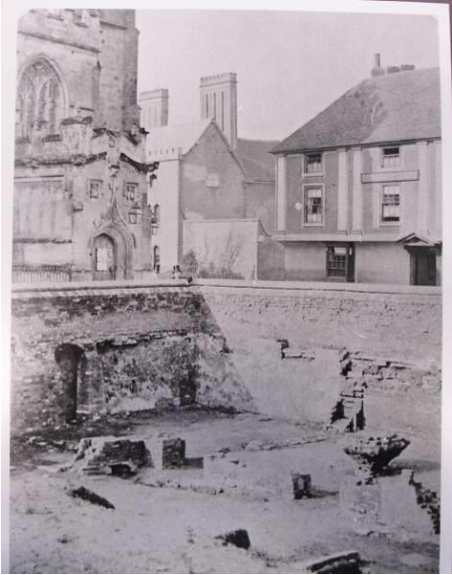
James Halliwell-Phillipps' 1864 excavation of Shakespeare's New Place

In 1848, he published his Life of Shakespeare, illustrated by John Thomas Blight (1835–1911), which had several editions; in 1853–1865 a sumptuous edition, limited to 150 copies, of Shakespeare in folio, (Note: Shakespeare in folio) with full critical notes. After 1870 he entirely gave up textual criticism, and devoted his attention to elucidating the particulars of Shakespeare's life. He collated all the available facts and documents in relation to it, and exhausted the information to be found in local records in his Outlines of the Life of Shakespeare. (Note: Outlines of the Life of Shakespeare) He was instrumental in the purchase of New Place for the corporation of Stratford-on-Avon, and in the formation there of the Shakespeare museum.

He assumed the name of Phillipps in 1872, under the will of the grandfather of his wife, Henrietta Phillipps. She died on 25 March 1879 after many years of ill health following a riding accident in 1872. He remarried Mary Rice (1851/2–1927) in June 1879.

He took an active interest in the Camden Society, the Percy Society and the Shakespeare Society, for which he edited many early English and Elizabethan works. He died on 3 January 1889 at his home, and was buried in Patcham churchyard, near Hollingbury in East Sussex.

His house, Hollingbury Copse, near Brighton, was full of rare and curious works. During his lifetime he donated a number of collections to different institutions. There is a substantial collection of ballads and broadside at Chetham's Library, Manchester donated in 1852. There were also generous gifts to the Morrab Library of Penzance, to the Smithsonian Institution, and to the Edinburgh University Library. His principal remaining Shakespearian collections, once intended for Stratford, were sold to Marsden J. Perry of Providence, Rhode Island, and in 1908 passed largely to Henry Clay Folger and are now at Folger Shakespeare Library in Washington, DC.

== Works ==
His publications in all numbered more than sixty volumes, including:

- (1840). The Connexion of Wales with the early Science of England.
- (1840). A Few Notes on the History of the Discovery of the Composition of Water.
- (1841). Shakespeariana. J. R. Smith (reissued by Cambridge University Press, 2009; ISBN 978-1-108-00002-4)
- (1842). Cambridge Jokes: From the Seventeenth to the Twentieth Century. Thomas Stevenson, Tilt and Bogue (reissued by Cambridge University Press, 2009; ISBN 978-1-108-00122-9)
- (1842). An Account of the European Manuscripts in the Chetham Library, Manchester.
- (1843). The Nursery Rhymes of England, obtained principally from oral tradition.
- (1843). A Collection of Pieces in the Dialect of Zummerzet.
- (1846). A Dictionary of Archaic & Provincial Words, Obsolete Phrases, Proverbs & Ancient Customs, From the Fourteenth Century, Volume I A-I
- (1847). A Dictionary of Archaic & Provincial Words, Obsolete Phrases, Proverbs & Ancient Customs, From the Fourteenth Century, Volume II J-Z
- (1847). An historical sketch of the Provincial Dialects of England, illustrated by numerous examples.
- (1848). Some account of the Vernon Manuscript, a volume of early English poetry preserved in the Bodleian Library.
- (1849). Notices of the History and Antiquities of Islip.
- (1849). Popular Rhymes and Nursery Tales: a sequel to The Nursery Rhymes of England.
- (1851). Notes on Ascertaining the Value, and Directions for the Preservation, of Old Books, Manuscripts, Deeds and Family Papers.
- (1854). Brief Observations on some Ancient Systems of Notation.
- (1855). Contributions to English Lexicography.
- (1856). A Catalogue of an Unique Collection of Ancient English Broadside Ballads, with notes of the tunes and imprints.
- (1859). An Introduction to the Evidences of Christianity.
- (1860). Notes of Family Excursions in North Wales, taken chiefly from Rhyl, Abergele, Llandudno, and Bangor.
- (1860). A Skeleton Hand-List of the Early Quarto editions of the Plays of Shakespeare; with notices of the old impressions of the Poems.
- (1860). A Dictionary of Old English Plays, Existing Either in Print or in Manuscript, from the Earliest times to the Close of the Seventeenth Century.
- (1861). Rambles in Western Cornwall by the Footsteps of the Giants; with notes on the Celtic remains of the Land's End district and the Islands of Scilly.
- (1863). A Calendar of the Records at Stratford-on-Avon
- (1864). An Historical Account of the New Place, Stratford-Upon-Avon, the Last Residence of Shakespeare
- (1866). A Hand-Book Index to the Works of Shakespeare: Including References to the Phrases, Manners, Customs, Proverbs, Songs, Particles, &c., Which Are Used or Alluded to by the Great Dramatist. J.E. Adlard (reissued by Cambridge University Press, 2009; ISBN 978-1-108-00121-2)
- (1884). The Stratford Records and the Shakespeare Autotypes. A brief review of singular delusions that are current at Stratford-on-Avon
