= Nursery rhyme =

Traditional song or poem for children

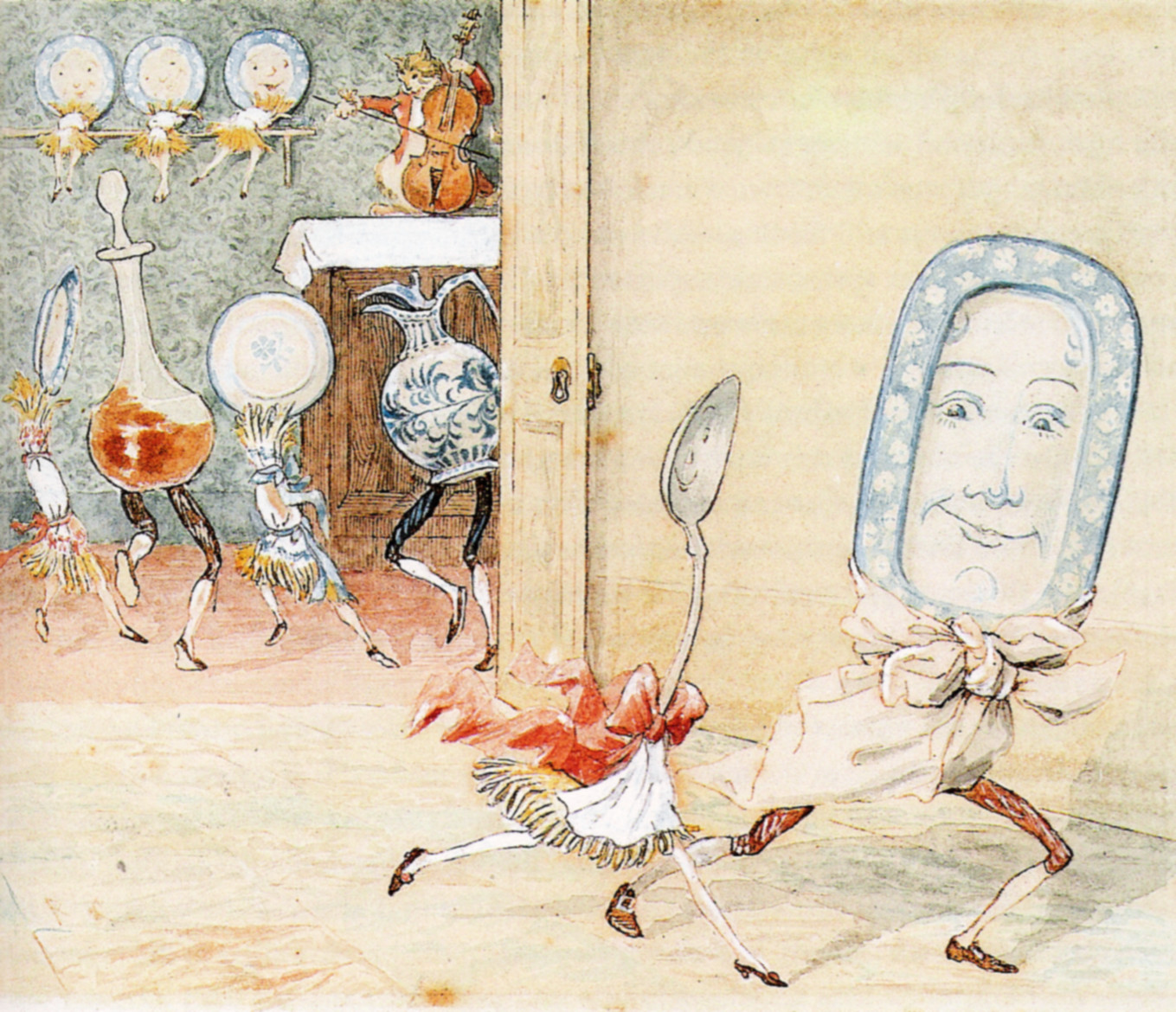
Illustration of "Hey Diddle Diddle", a well-known nursery rhyme

A nursery rhyme is a traditional poem or song for children in Britain and other European countries, but usage of the term dates only from c. 1800. The term Mother Goose rhymes is interchangeable with nursery rhymes. Nursery rhymes can be considered a type of childlore.

From the mid-16th century nursery rhymes began to be recorded in English plays, and most popular rhymes date from the 17th and 18th centuries. The first English collections, Tommy Thumb's Song Book and a sequel, Tommy Thumb's Pretty Song Book, were published by Mary Cooper in 1744. Publisher John Newbery's stepson, Thomas Carnan, was the first to use the term Mother Goose for nursery rhymes when he published a compilation of English rhymes, Mother Goose's Melody, or Sonnets for the Cradle (London, 1780). (Note: Previously Mother Goose meant fairy tales, with Perrault's collection of fairy tales translated from French, "Contes de ma mere l'Oye" into English in 1729 by Robert Samber as "Tales of Mother Goose.")

== History ==
=== Lullabies ===
The oldest children's songs for which records exist are lullabies, intended to help a child fall asleep. Lullabies can be found in every human culture. The English term lullaby is thought to come from "lu, lu" or "la la" sounds made by mothers or nurses to calm children, and "by by" or "bye bye", either another lulling sound or a term for a good night. Until the modern era, lullabies were usually recorded only incidentally in written sources. The Roman nurses' lullaby "Lalla, Lalla, Lalla, aut dormi, aut lacta" is recorded in a scholium on Persius and may be the oldest to survive.

Many medieval English verses associated with the birth of Jesus take the form of a lullaby, including "Lullay, my liking, my dere son, my sweting", and may be versions of contemporary lullabies. However, most of those used today date from the 17th century. For example, a well-known lullaby such as "Rock-a-bye Baby", could not be found in records until the late-18th century when it was printed by John Newbery (c. 1765).

=== Early nursery rhymes ===
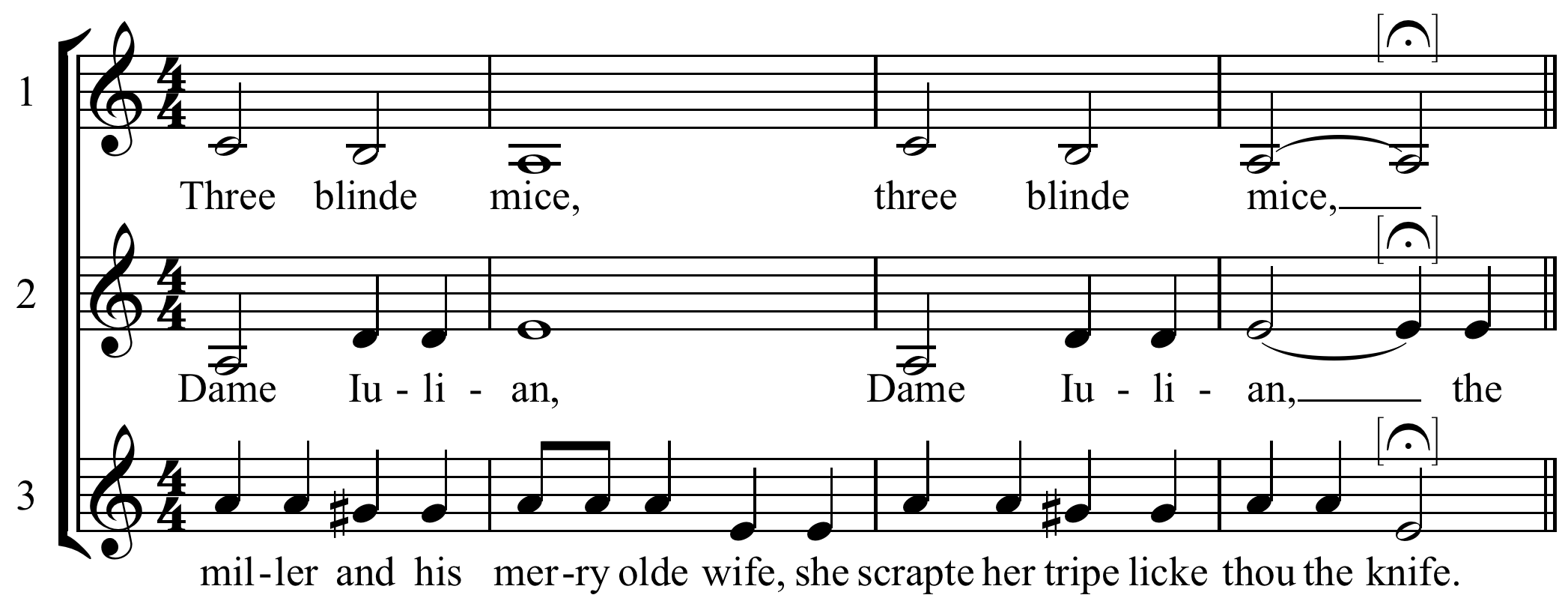
"Three Blinde Mice" (1609), published by Thomas Ravenscroft

A French poem, similar to "Thirty days hath September", numbering the days of the month, was recorded in the 13th century. From the later Middle Ages, there are records of short children's rhyming songs, often as marginalia. From the mid-16th century, they began to be recorded in English plays. "Pat-a-cake" is one of the oldest surviving English nursery rhymes. The earliest recorded version of the rhyme appears in Thomas d'Urfey's play The Campaigners from 1698. Most nursery rhymes were not written down until the 18th century when the publishing of children's books began to move from polemic and education towards entertainment, but there is evidence for many rhymes existing before this, including "To market, to market" and "Cock a doodle doo", which date from at least the late 16th century. Nursery rhymes with 17th-century origins include, "Jack Sprat" (1639), "The Grand Old Duke of York" (1642), "Lavender's Blue" (1672) and "Rain Rain Go Away" (1687).

"Oranges and Lemons" (1744) is set to the tune of the bells of St Clement Danes, an Anglican church in the City of Westminster, London.

The first English collection, Tommy Thumb's Song Book and a sequel, Tommy Thumb's Pretty Song Book, were published by Mary Cooper in London in 1744, with such songs becoming known as "Tommy Thumb's songs". A copy of the latter is held in the British Library. John Newbery's stepson, Thomas Carnan, was the first to use the term Mother Goose for nursery rhymes when he published a compilation of English rhymes, Mother Goose's Melody, or, Sonnets for the Cradle (London, 1780). These rhymes seem to have come from a variety of sources, including traditional riddles, proverbs, ballads, lines of Mummers' plays, drinking songs, historical events, and, it has been suggested, ancient pagan rituals. One example of a nursery rhyme in the form of a riddle is "As I was going to St Ives", which dates to 1730. About half of the currently recognised "traditional" English rhymes were known by the mid-18th century. More English rhymes were collected by Joseph Ritson in Gammer Gurton's Garland or The Nursery Parnassus (1784), published in London by Joseph Johnson.

=== 19th century ===
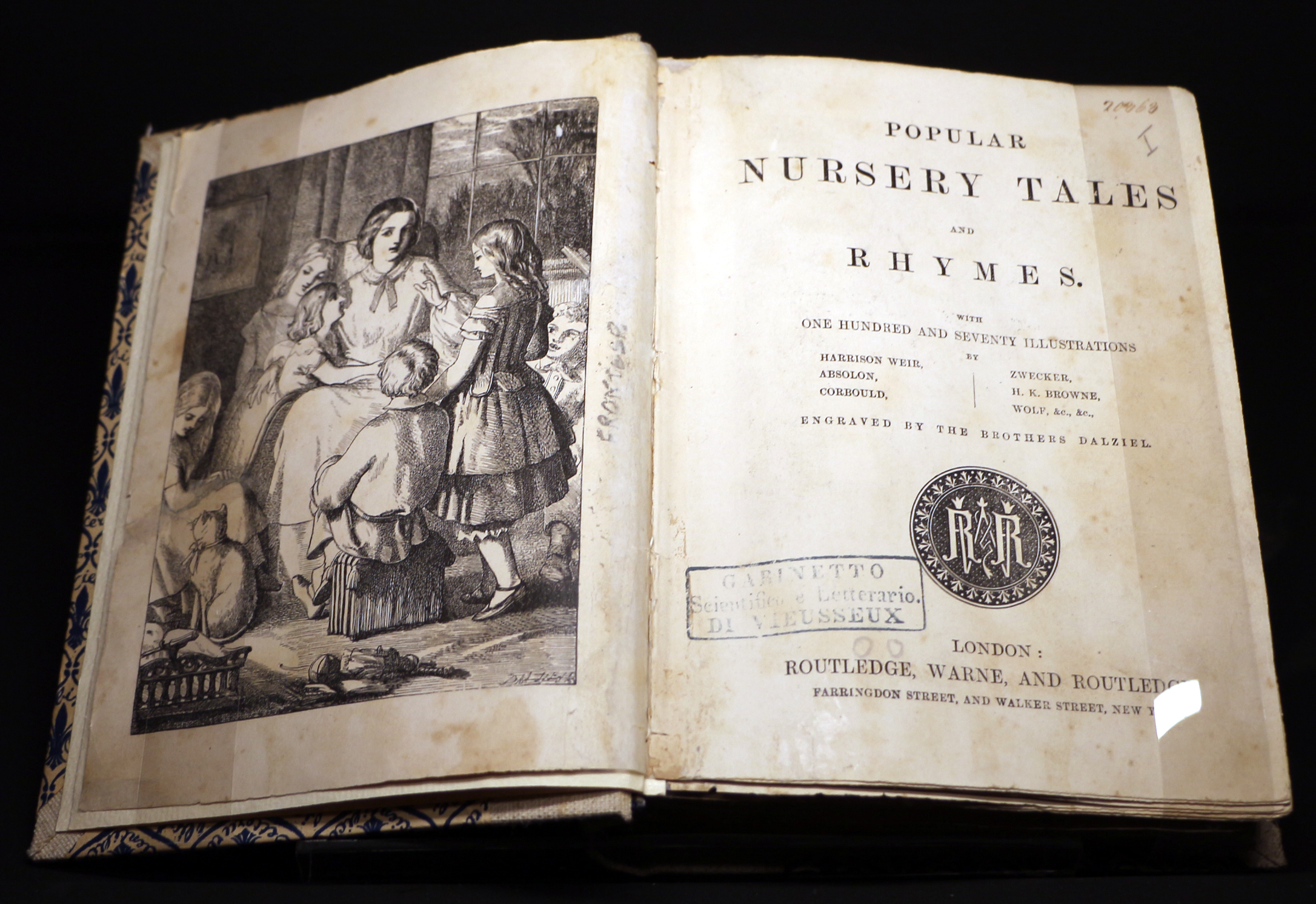
Popular Nursery Tales and Rhymes, Warner & Routledge, London, c. 1859

A person singing "Twinkle Twinkle Little Star"

In the early 19th century, printed collections of rhymes began to spread to other countries, including Robert Chambers' Popular Rhymes of Scotland (1826) and in the United States, Mother Goose's Melodies (1833). From this period, the origins and authors of rhymes are sometimes known—for instance, in "Twinkle, Twinkle, Little Star" which combines the melody of an 18th-century French tune "Ah vous dirai-je, Maman" with a 19th-century English poem by Jane Taylor entitled "The Star" used as lyrics.

Early folk song collectors also often collected (what is now known as) nursery rhymes, including in Scotland Sir Walter Scott and in Germany Clemens Brentano and Achim von Arnim in Des Knaben Wunderhorn (1806–1808). The first, and possibly the most important academic collection to focus in this area was James Halliwell-Phillipps' The Nursery Rhymes of England (1842) and Popular Rhymes and Tales in 1849, in which he divided rhymes into antiquities (historical), fireside stories, game-rhymes, alphabet-rhymes, riddles, nature-rhymes, places and families, proverbs, superstitions, customs, and nursery songs (lullabies). By the time of Sabine Baring-Gould's A Book of Nursery Songs (1895), folklore was an academic study full of comments and footnotes. A professional anthropologist, Andrew Lang (1844–1912) produced The Nursery Rhyme Book in 1897.

=== 20th century ===
The early years of the 20th century are notable for the illustrations of children's books, including Randolph Caldecott's Hey Diddle Diddle Picture Book (1909) and Arthur Rackham's Mother Goose (1913). The definitive study of English rhymes remains the work of Iona and Peter Opie.

== Meanings of nursery rhymes ==
Many nursery rhymes have been argued to have hidden meanings and origins. John Bellenden Ker (1764–1842), for example, wrote four volumes arguing that English nursery rhymes were written in "Low Saxon", a hypothetical early form of Dutch. He then "translated" them back into English, revealing in particular a strong tendency to anti-clericalism. Many of the ideas about the links between rhymes and historical persons, or events, can be traced back to Katherine Elwes' book The Real Personages of Mother Goose (1930), in which she linked famous nursery rhyme characters with real people, on little or no evidence. She posited that children's songs were a peculiar form of coded historical narrative, propaganda or covert protest, and did not believe that they were written simply for entertainment.

Title	Supposed origin	Earliest date known	Meaning supported by evidence
"Arthur o' Bower"	King Arthur as leader of the Wild Hunt	Late 18th century (Britain)	Conjectural
"Baa, Baa, Black Sheep"	The slave trade; medieval wool tax	c. 1744 (Britain)	Medieval taxes were much lower than two-thirds. There is no evidence of a connection with slavery.
"Doctor Foster"	Edward I of England	1844 (Britain)	Given the recent recording, the medieval meaning is unlikely.
"Goosey Goosey Gander"	Henry VIII	1784 (Britain)	No evidence that it is linked to the propaganda campaign against the Catholic Church during the reign of King Henry VIII.
"The Grand Old Duke of York"	Richard Plantagenet, 3rd Duke of York in the Wars of the Roses; James II of England or Prince Frederick, Duke of York and Albany; Flanders campaign of 1794–95.	1913 (Britain)	The more recent campaign is more likely, but the first record is very late. The song may be based on a song about the king of France.
"Hickory Dickory Dock"	Exeter Cathedral astronomical clock	1744 (Britain)	In the 17th century, the clock had a small hole in the door below the face for the resident cat to hunt mice.
"Humpty Dumpty"	Richard III of England; Cardinal Thomas Wolsey and a cannon from the English Civil War	1797 (Britain)	No evidence that it refers to any historical character and is originally a riddle found in many European cultures. The story about the cannon is based on a spoof verse written in 1956.
"Jack and Jill"	Norse mythology; Charles I of England; John, King of England; Louis XVI and Marie Antoinette	1765 (Britain)	No evidence that it stretches back to the early medieval era and the poem predates the French Revolution.
"Little Boy Blue"	Thomas Wolsey	c. 1760 (Britain)	Unknown; the identification is speculative.
"Little Jack Horner"	Dissolution of the monasteries	1725 (Britain), but the story known from c. 1520	The rhyme may have been adapted to satirise Thomas Horner who benefited from the Dissolution, but the connection is speculative.
"London Bridge Is Falling Down"	Burial of human sacrifices in foundations (immurement); burning of a wooden bridge by Vikings	1659 (Britain)	Unknown, but verse exists in many cultures and may have been adapted to London when it reached England.
"Mary Had a Little Lamb"	An original poem by Sarah Josepha Hale inspired by an actual incident.	1830 (US)	As a girl, Mary Sawyer (later Mrs. Mary Tyler) kept a pet lamb, which she took to school one day at the suggestion of her brother.
"Mary, Mary, Quite Contrary"	Mary, Queen of Scots or Mary I of England	c. 1744 (Britain)	Unknown; all identifications are speculative.
"The Muffin Man"	Street sellers of muffins in Britain.	c. 1820 (Britain)	The location of Drury Lane is a thoroughfare bordering Covent Garden in London.
"Old King Cole"	Various early medieval kings and Richard Cole-brook, a Reading clothier	1708–09 (Britain)	Richard Cole-brook was widely known as King Cole in the 17th century.
"One for Sorrow"	Records the superstition (it is not clear whether it has been seriously believed) that seeing magpies predicts the future, depending on how many are seen	1780 (Britain)	The magpie was considered a bird of ill omen in Britain at least as far back as the early 16th century.
"Ring a Ring o' Roses"	Black Death (1348) or The Great Plague of London (1665)	1880 (Britain)	No evidence that the poem has any relation to the plague, which was 500 years in the past at the earliest known time of writing. The "plague" references are not present in the earliest versions.
"Rock-a-bye Baby"	The Egyptian god Horus; Son of James II of England preceding the Glorious Revolution; Native American childcare; anti-Jacobite satire	c. 1765 (Britain)	Unknown; all identifications are speculative.
"Sing a Song of Sixpence"	Dissolution of the monasteries by Henry VIII, with Catherine of Aragon representing the queen, and Anne Boleyn the maid.	c. 1744 (Britain)	Unknown; all identifications are speculative.
"There Was an Old Woman Who Lived in a Shoe"	Queen Caroline of Ansbach, wife of King George II of Great Britain; Elizabeth Vergoose of Boston.	1784 (Britain)	Unknown; all identifications are speculative.
"Three Blind Mice"	Mary I of England	c. 1609 (Britain)	Unknown; the identification is speculative.
"Who Killed Cock Robin?"	Norse mythology; Robin Hood; William II of England; Robert Walpole; Ritual bird sacrifice	c. 1744 (Britain)	The story, and perhaps rhyme, dates from at least the later medieval era, but all identifications are speculative.

== Nursery rhyme revisionism ==
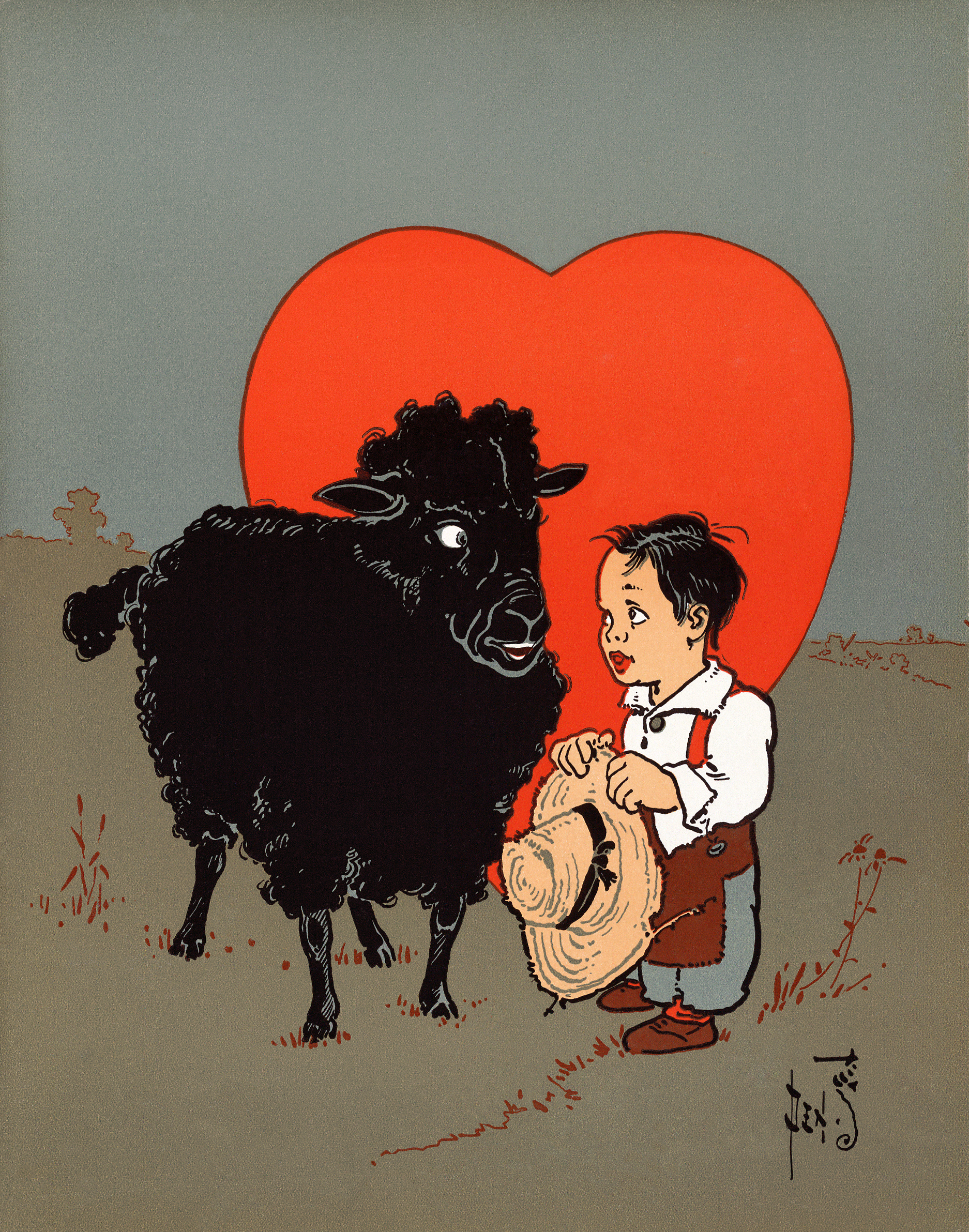
"Baa, Baa, Black Sheep", from a 1901 illustration by William Wallace Denslow

There have been several attempts across the world to revise nursery rhymes (along with fairy tales and popular songs). As recently as the late 18th century, rhymes like "Little Robin Redbreast" were occasionally cleaned up for a young audience. In the late 19th century, the major concern seems to have been violence and crime, which led some children's publishers in the United States like Jacob Abbot and Samuel Goodrich to change Mother Goose rhymes.

In the early and mid-20th centuries, this was a form of bowdlerisation, concerned with some of the more violent elements of nursery rhymes and led to the formation of organisations like the British "Society for Nursery Rhyme Reform". Psychoanalysts such as Bruno Bettelheim strongly criticised this revisionism, because it weakened their usefulness to both children and adults as ways of symbolically resolving issues and it has been argued that revised versions may not perform the functions of catharsis for children, or allow them to imaginatively deal with violence and danger.

In the late 20th century, revisionism of nursery rhymes became associated with the idea of political correctness. Most attempts to reform nursery rhymes on this basis appear to be either very small scale, light-hearted updating, like Felix Dennis's When Jack Sued Jill – Nursery Rhymes for Modern Times (2006), or satires written as if from the point of view of political correctness to condemn reform. The controversy in Britain in 1986 over changing the language of "Baa, Baa, Black Sheep" because it was alleged in the popular press, that it was seen as racially dubious, was based only on a rewriting of the rhyme in one private nursery, as an exercise for the children.

== Nursery rhymes and education ==
It has been argued that nursery rhymes set to music aid in a child's development. In the German Kniereitvers, the child is put in mock peril, but the experience is a pleasurable one of care and support, which over time the child comes to command for itself. Research also supports the assertion that music and rhyme increase a child's ability in spatial reasoning, which aids mathematics skills.

== See also ==
- Children's music
- Children's song
- Counting-out game
- Fingerplay
- Folklore
- Limerick (poetry)
- List of nursery rhymes
- Oral tradition

== Citations ==
Sources

- Carpenter, H.; Prichard, M. (1984). The Oxford Companion to Children's Literature. Oxford University Press. ISBN 978-0-19-211582-9.
- Opie, Ilona; Opie, Peter (1997) [1951]. The Oxford Dictionary of Nursery Rhymes (2nd ed.). Oxford: Oxford University Press.
- Opie, Ilona (2004). "Playground rhymes and the oral tradition". In P. Hunt; S. G. Bannister Ray (eds.). International Companion Encyclopedia of Children's Literature. London: Routledge.
