= List of nursery rhymes =

The terms "nursery rhyme" and "children's song" emerged in the 1820s, although this type of children's literature previously existed with different names such as Tommy Thumb Songs and Mother Goose Songs. The first known book containing a collection of these texts was Tommy Thumb's Pretty Song Book, which was published by Mary Cooper in 1744. The works of several scholars and collectors helped document and preserve these oral traditions as well as their histories. These include Iona and Peter Opie, Joseph Ritson, James Orchard Halliwell, and Sir Walter Scott. While there are "nursery rhymes" which are also called "children's songs", not every children's song is referred to as a nursery rhyme (example: Puff, the Magic Dragon, and Baby Shark). This list is limited to songs which are known as nursery rhymes through reliable sources.

== Known date ==
| Title | Other titles | Country of origin | Year first recorded (Note: This refers to when the given nursery rhyme was first mentioned in a written work. An exact year for many of these rhymes may never be known as they were passed down orally.) | Source |
|---|---|---|---|---|
| Ah! vous dirai-je, maman | 'Oh! Shall I tell you, Mama' | France | 1774 | The earliest known printed publication was in volume two of Recueil de Romances by M.D.L. (Charles de Lusse). |
| Aiken Drum | | United Kingdom | 1820 | The rhyme was first printed in 1820 by James Hogg in Jacobite Reliques. |
| Apple Pie ABC | | United Kingdom | 1871 | Edward Lear made fun of the original rhyme in his nonsense parody "A was once an apple pie". |
| Akka bakka bonka rakka | | Norway | 1901 | Nora Kobberstad's Norsk Lekebok (Book of Norwegian Games). |
| All the Pretty Little Horses | 'Hush-a-bye' | United States | 1903 (Note: This is an early published version under the name "A White Dove".) | Early version by Maud McKnight Lindsay (1874–1941), a teacher from Alabama and daughter of Robert B. Lindsay. |
| Arthur o' Bower | | United Kingdom | 1805 | Evidence of a letter by William Wordsworth. |
| A Wise Old Owl | 'There was an owl lived in an oak, wisky, wasky, weedle.' | United Kingdom | 1875 | First published in Punch on April 10, 1875. |
| A-Tisket, A-Tasket | | United States | 1879 | Originally noted in 1879 as a children's rhyming game. |
| A-Hunting We Will Go | | Great Britain | 1777 | Composed in 1777 by English composer Thomas Arne. |
| Akai Kutsu | Akai Kutsu (赤い靴, 'Red Shoes') | Japan | 1922 | Poem by Ujō Noguchi, a basis on factual events is disputed. |
| Alphabet song | Several other titles... (Note: "The ABC Song" is also referred to as 'Now I Know My ABCs', 'The ABC', 'ABC Song', 'ABCs' /ˌeɪ.biːˈsiːz/ or 'ABC' /ˌeɪ.biːˈsiː/, as well as 'The Alphabet Song', 'The Alphabet', 'Alphabet Song' or 'Alphabet'.) | United States | 1835 | The melody in this format was first copyrighted in 1835 by Boston music publisher Charles Bradlee. |
| Alouette | | Canada | 1870 | Mentioned in "A Pocket Song Book for the Use of Students and Graduates of McGill Colle". |
| Baa, Baa, Black Sheep | | Great Britain | 1744 | First mentioned in Tommy Thumb's Pretty Song Book. |
| Backe, backe Kuchen | 'Bake a Cake, Bake a Cake' | Holy Roman Empire (Germany) | 1450 | The original form of the text with the rhymed list of ingredients can be found as early as 1450 in Maister Hannsen's von Wirtenberg Koch Cookbook. |
| Baloo Baleerie | 'The Bressay Lullaby' | United Kingdom | 1949 | Alliterative nonsense based around the Scots word for lullaby, "baloo". |
| Bananas in Pyjamas | | Australia | 1967 | It was also used as a nursery rhyme in the VHS Nursery Play Rhymes. |
| Billy Boy | | United States | 1912 | Variant of the traditional English folk song "My Boy Billy", collected by Ralph Vaughan Williams. |
| Bingo | Several other titles... (Note: "Bingo" is also referred to as 'The Farmer's Dog Leapt o'er the Stile', 'A Franklyn's Dogge', 'Little Bingo', 'Bingo Was His Name-O', 'There Was a Farmer Had a Dog' and 'B-I-N-G-O') | Great Britain | 1780 | Attributed the song to William Swords, an actor at the Haymarket Theatre of London. The identity of "Bingo" in the song is formally ambiguous. |
| Bobby Shafto's Gone to Sea | 'Bobby Shafto' | United Kingdom | 1805 | The 18th-century British politician Bobby Shafto is a likely subject for this song. |
| Bye, baby Bunting | | Great Britain | 1731 | A version of this rhyme was first published in 1731 in England. |
| Christmas Is Coming | | United States | 1885 | Origin unknown, the lyrics begin appearing in print in 1885. |
| Did You Ever See a Lassie? | | United Kingdom; United States | 1909 | First published in 1909, in Games for the Playground, Home, School and Gymnasium by Jessie Hubbell Bancroft. |
| Ding Dong Bell | 'Ding Dong Dell' | England | 1580 | The earliest recorded reference to the rhyme is from John Lant, the organist of Winchester Cathedral in 1580. |
| Do Your Ears Hang Low? | 'Do your balls hang low' | United Kingdom | 1900 | "Do Your Ears Hang Low?" is a sanitized version of the original song. |
| Doctor Foster | | United Kingdom | 1844 | The rhyme was first published in its modern form in 1844. |
| Down by the Station | 'Down at the Station' | United States | 1947 | Written by Paul Mills and Slim Gaillard and first recorded by The Slim Gaillard Trio in 1947. |
| E Rere Taku Poi | | New Zealand | 1944 | An early recording by Helen Creighton of this traditional Māori song is provided by the Library of Congress. |
| Finger Family | | United States | 2000 | This song first appeared on Little Fox in 2000, however the lyrics were a bit different. This song is similar to the nursery rhyme Where is Thumbkin. |
| For He's a Jolly Good Fellow | 'The Bear Went Over The Mountain' | France; Great Britain | 1709 | Allegedly composed the night after the Battle of Malplaquet in 1709. |
| Frog Went a-Courting | 'Frog Wen A-Courtin'' | Scotland; England | 1549 | First mentioned in The Complaynt of Scotland, it later appeared in 1611 as an English song by Thomas Ravenscroft. |
| Georgie Porgie | 'Georgy Peorgy' | United Kingdom | 1841 | Origin unknown, first appeared in The Kentish Coronal where the rhyme was described as an "old ballad". |
| Girls and Boys Come Out to Play | 'Boys and Girls Come Out to Play' | Great Britain | 1708 | The first two lines appeared in dance books in 1708. |
| Goosey Goosey Gander | | Great Britain | 1784 | The earliest recorded version of this rhyme is in Gammer Gurton's Garland or The Nursery Parnassus published in London in 1784. |
| Green Gravel | | United Kingdom | 1835 | Version collected in Manchester in 1835. |
| Hark, Hark! The Dogs Do Bark | 'Hark, Hark' | Great Britain | 1788 | This rhyme was first published in 1788. |
| Head, Shoulders, Knees and Toes | | United Kingdom | 1912 | Origin unknown, lyrics from this song are mentioned as early as 1912. |
| Here we go Loop de Loop | "Looby Loo", "Loopty Loo", "Loop de Loo", or just "Dancing Looby" | United States | 1849 | Mentioned as early as 1849 in James Orchard Halliwell-Phillipps' Popular Rhymes and Nursery Tales, as "Dancing Looby." |
| Hickory Dickory Dock | 'Hickety Dickety Dock' | Great Britain | 1744 | First mentioned in Tommy Thumb's Pretty Song Book. |
| Hokey Pokey | 'The Hokey Pokey', 'The Hokey Cokey' | United Kingdom | 1842 | Included in Robert Chambers' Popular Rhymes of Scotland from 1842. |
| Hot Cross Buns | | Great Britain | 1767 | This originated as an English street cry that was later perpetuated as a nursery rhyme. The words closest to the rhyme that has survived were printed in 1767. |
| Humpty Dumpty | | Great Britain | 1797 | The earliest known version was published in Samuel Arnold's Juvenile Amusements in 1797 |
| Hush, Little Baby | 'Hush Little baby, don't say a word' | United States | 1918 | English folklorist Cecil Sharp collected and notated a version from Endicott, Franklin County, Virginia in 1918. |
| I Can Sing a Rainbow | Several other titles... (Note: "I Can Sing a Rainbow" is also known simply as Rainbow Song, "Sing a Rainbow," or I can see a Rainbow) | United States | 1955 | This was featured in the 1955 film Pete Kelly's Blues, where it was sung by Peggy Lee. |
| Ichinensei Ni Nattara | When I Become A First-Grader (一年生になったら) | Japan | 1966 | This song was composed by Naozumi Yamamoto and written by the poet Michio Mado. |
| If wishes were horses, beggars would ride | 'If wishes were horses' | England | 1628 | First recorded about 1628 in a collection of Scottish proverbs. |
| I do not like thee, Doctor Fell | | England | 1680 | Allegedly translated by satirical English poet Tom Brown in 1680. |
| I Had a Little Nut Tree | | Great Britain | 1797 | The first recorded instance of the rhyme is in Newest Christmas Box, printed in London in 1797. |
| I'm a Little Teapot | | United States | 1939 | Originally written by George Harry Sanders and Clarence Z. Kelley and published in 1939. |
| I've Been Working on the Railroad | 'Working on the Railroad' or 'I Have Been Working on the Railroad' | United States | 1894 | The first published version appeared as "Levee Song" in Carmina Princetonia, a book of Princeton University songs published in 1894. |
| I Love Little Pussy | 'I Love Little Kitty' | United Kingdom | 1830 | The poem is first recorded in The Child's Song Book published in 1830. |
| It's Raining, It's Pouring | | United States | 1912 | The first two lines of this rhyme can be found in "The Little Mother Goose", published in the United States in 1912. |
| Jack Sprat | 'Jack Spratt' | England | 1639 | First appearance in John Clarke's collection of sayings. |
| Kookaburra | 'Kookaburra sits in the old gum tree' | Australia | 1932 | Attributed to Marion Sinclair, who was a music teacher at Toorak College. |
| Ladybird, Ladybird | 'Ladybug Ladybug' | Great Britain | 1744 | First mentioned in Tommy Thumb's Pretty Song Book. |
| Little Boy Blue | | Great Britain | 1744 | First mentioned in Tommy Thumb's Pretty Song Book. |
| Little Jack Horner | 'Little Jack Horner sat in a corner' | Great Britain | 1791 | The earliest surviving English edition is from 1791. |
| Little Miss Muffet | 'Little Miss Muffet sat on a tuffet' | United Kingdom | 1805 | The rhyme first appeared in print in Songs for the Nursery. |
| Little Robin Redbreast | | Great Britain | 1744 | First mentioned in Tommy Thumb's Pretty Song Book. |
| Little Tommy Tucker | | Great Britain | 1744 | First mentioned in Tommy Thumb's Pretty Song Book. |
| London Bridge Is Falling Down | 'My Fair Lady' or 'London Bridge' | Great Britain | 1744 | First mentioned in Tommy Thumb's Song Book. |
| Lucy Locket | 'Lucy Locket lost her pocket' | United Kingdom | 1842 | The rhyme was first recorded by James Orchard Halliwell. |
| Mary Had a Little Lamb | 'Mary had a Little Lamb, Little Lamb, Little Lamb' | United States | 1830 | First published by the Boston publishing firm Marsh, Capen & Lyon, as a poem by Sarah Josepha Hale on May 24, 1830. |
| Mary, Mary, Quite Contrary | | Great Britain | 1744 | First mentioned in Tommy Thumb's Pretty Song Book. |
| Matthew, Mark, Luke and John | "Black Paternoster" | England | 1656 | Thomas Ady's witchcraft treatise A Candle in the Dark, or, a treatise concerning the nature of witches and witchcraft. |
| Miss Polly Had a Dolly | Several other titles... (Note: "Miss Polly Had a Dolly" is also referred to as; 'Miss Molly Had a Dolly', 'Miss Polly', 'Miss Polly had a little dolly', 'Miss Polly had a dolly who was sick, sick, sick', and/or 'Miss Molly had a dolly who was sick, sick, sick') | United Kingdom | 1986 | This song was published as early as 1986 by Maureen Sinclair in Glasgow Scotland. |
| Monday's Child | | United Kingdom | 1836 | This rhyme was first recorded in A. E. Bray's Traditions of Devonshire (Volume II, pp. 287–288). |
| Needles and Pins | | United Kingdom | 1842 | First recorded in the proverbs section of James Orchard Halliwell's The Nursery Rhymes of England. |
| Old King Cole | | Great Britain | 1709 | The song is first attested in William King's Useful Transactions in Philosophy for January and February 1709. |
| Old MacDonald Had a Farm | Several other titles... (Note: In his book, Frederick Nettleingham referenced "Old Macdougal". Later versions with "MacDonald" are also referred to as "McDonald", and "Old" is sometimes shortened to "Ol".) | Great Britain | 1706 | The origin of this song is attributed to Thomas d'Urfey for an opera in 1706. Its modern-day lyrics originate in Frederick Thomas Nettleingham's 1917 book Tommy's Tunes. |
| Old Mother Hubbard | | United Kingdom | 1805 | The Comic Adventures of Old Mother Hubbard and her Dog is attributed to Sarah Catherine Martin (1768–1826). |
| On Top of Spaghetti | 'The Meatball Song' | United States | 1963 | Children's parody by Tom Glazer of the song "On Top of Old Smoky". |
| One Day A Taniwha | | New Zealand | 2009 | The song was invented by Beatrice Yates in the 1970s in Rotorua, however it wasn't published until August 2009 |
| One, Two, Buckle My Shoe | '1, 2, Buckle My Shoe' | United States; United Kingdom | 1805 | While the first recorded version is of English origin, this song may go back to 1780 in Wrentham, Massachusetts. |
| Oranges and Lemons | | Great Britain | 1744 | First mentioned in Tommy Thumb's Pretty Song Book. |
| Pat-a-cake, pat-a-cake, baker's man | "Pat-a-cake", "patty-cake" or "pattycake" | England | 1698 | This rhyme first appears in Thomas D'Urfey's play The Campaigners from 1698. |
| Peter, Peter, Pumpkin Eater | | Great Britain | 1797 | First published in Infant Institutes, part the first: or a Nurserical Essay on the Poetry, Lyric and Allegorical, of the Earliest Ages, &c., in London. |
| Peter Piper | | United Kingdom | 1813 | Published in John Harris' Peter Piper's Practical Principles of Plain and Perfect Pronunciation in 1813. |
| Polly Put the Kettle On | | United Kingdom | 1803 | "Molly Put the Kettle On or Jenny's Baubie" was published by Joseph Dale in London. |
| Polly Wolly Doodle | 'Polly Wolly Doodle All Day' | United States | 1843 | Sung by Dan Emmett's Virginia Minstrels, who premiered at New York's Bowery Amphitheatre. |
| Pop Goes the Weasel | | United Kingdom | 1852 | By December 1852, "Pop Goes The Weasel" was a popular social dance in England. |
| Pussy Cat Pussy Cat | | United Kingdom | 1805 | The earliest record of the rhyme is publication in Songs for the Nursery. |
| Rain Rain Go Away | 'Rain, Rain Go Away, come again another day' | England | 1659 | James Howell in his 1659 collection of proverbs noted "Raine, raine, goe to Spain: faire weather come againe". |
| Ride a cock horse to Banbury Cross | 'Ride a Cock Horse', 'Ride a White Horse to Banbury Cross' | Great Britain | 1784 | The earliest surviving version of the modern rhyme can be found in Gammer Gurton's Garland or The Nursery Parnassus. |
| Ring-a-Ring o' Roses | 'Ring Around the Rosie' | United Kingdom | 1881 | Origin unknown, there is no evidence linking it to the Great Plague or earlier outbreaks of bubonic plague in England. |
| Roses Are Red | | Great Britain | 1784 | A rhyme similar to the modern standard version can be found in Gammer Gurton's Garland. |
| Row, Row, Row Your Boat | | United States | 1852 | The earliest printing of the song has published lyrics similar to those used today, but with a different tune. |
| Rub-a-dub-dub | | Great Britain | 1798 | One early recorded version is in Christmas Box, published in London in 1798. |
| Shabondama | 'シャボン玉' or 'Soap Bubbles' | Japan | 1923 | Composed by Shinpei Nakayama with lyrics written by Ujō Noguchi. |
| She'll Be Coming Round The Mountain | 'When She Comes', 'When the Chariot Comes' | United States | 1924 | The earliest known recording of this song was by Henry Whitter on Okeh Records (OKeh 40063) in 1924. (Note: This source is specifically for the song title: "She'll Be Coming Round The Mountain". The original song "When the Chariot Comes" pre-dates the 20th century.) |
| Simple Simon | | Great Britain | 1764 | The verses used today are the first of a longer chapbook history first published in 1764. |
| Sing a Song of Sixpence | | Great Britain | 1744 | First mentioned in Tommy Thumb's Pretty Song Book. |
| Skidamarink | 'Skinnamarink', 'Ski-dy-mer-rink-adink-aboomp', 'Skiddy-Mer-Rink-A-Doo' | United States | 1910 | The initial version of the song was written by Felix F. Feist (lyrics) and Al Piantadosi (music) for the 1910 Charles Dillingham Broadway production The Echo. |
| Solomon Grundy | | United Kingdom | 1842 | First collected by James Orchard Halliwell and published in 1842. |
| Soft Kitty | | Poland | 1857 | Władysław Syrokomla and Wiktor Każyński published a version of this song in 1857, in Pieśniach ludu polskiego ("Songs of the Polish people"). |
| Ten Little Indians | | United States | 1868 | Songwriter Septimus Winner created an elaborated version called "Ten Little Injuns" for a minstrel show. |
| The Cat Sat Asleep by the Side of the Fire | | United Kingdom | 1810 | The earliest recorded version of this rhyme is in Gammer Gurton's Garland or The Nursery Parnassus (3rd edition) published in London in 1810. |
| The Farmer in the Dell | 'The Farmer's in his Den' | Germany | 1826 | This rhyme was first recorded in the German Confederation (present day Germany) in 1826, as "Es fuhr ein Bau'r ins Holz". |
| The Grand Old Duke of York | 'The Noble Duke of York' | England | 1642 | First mentioned under the title 'Old Tarlton's song', attributed to the stage clown Richard Tarlton (1530–1588). |
| The Lion and the Unicorn | | Great Britain | 1708 | In 1708, William King (1663–1712) recorded a verse very similar to the first stanza of the modern rhyme. |
| The Old Woman and Her Pig | 'The Old Woman who found a Silver Penny' | United Kingdom | 1806 | "The True History of a Little Old Woman Who Found a Silver Penny" published by Tabart & Co. at No. 157 New Bond Street, London, for their Juvenile Library. |
| The Queen of Hearts | | Great Britain | 1782 | Originally published in the British publication The European Magazine, vol. 1, no. 4, in April 1782 with lesser known stories. |
| The Three Jovial Huntsmen | | United Kingdom | 1880 | This is the title of a picture book illustrated by Randolph Caldecott, engraved and printed by Edmund Evans and published by George Routledge & Sons in London. |
| The Three Sisters | 'Jennifer Gentle' | United Kingdom | 1823 | Given by Davis Gilbert in his supplement to "Some Ancient Christmas Carols in the West of England" in 1823. |
| There Was a Crooked Man | | United Kingdom | 1842 | First recorded in print by James Orchard Halliwell in 1842. |
| There Was a Man in Our Town | 'A Man so Wise', 'The Wondrous Wise Man', or 'There Was a Man in Thessaly' | Great Britain | 1744 | First mentioned in Tommy Thumb's Song Book. |
| There Was an Old Woman Who Lived in a Shoe | | Great Britain | 1784 | The earliest printed version is in Joseph Ritson's Gammer Gurton's Garland. |
| There Was an Old Woman Who Lived Under a Hill | | Great Britain | 1714 | First appeared as part of a catch in The Academy of Complements. |
| This Is the House That Jack Built | 'The House That Jack Built' | Great Britain | 1755 | Included in Nurse Truelove's New-Year's-Gift, or the Book of Books for Children, printed in London in 1755. |
| This Old Man | Several other titles... (Note: "This Old Man" is also referred to as; 'Nick Nack Paddy Whack', 'Knick Knack Paddywhack', 'Nick Nack Paddywhack', 'Knick Knack Paddy Whack', and/or 'The Children's Marching Song') | United Kingdom | 1906 | The origins of this song are obscure and possibly very old. The "first recorded" date refers to an early published version. |
| Three Blind Mice | | England | 1609 | Published in Deuteromelia or The Seconde part of Musicks melodie (1609). |
| Three Little Kittens | | United Kingdom; United States | 1843 | Published by Eliza Lee Cabot Follen in New Nursery Songs for All Good Children. (Note: This refers to the "modern" nursery rhyme, as the original 1827 version was a mock review by William Ewart Gladstone. He wrote this under the name "Bartholomew Bouverie" in The Eton Miscellany.) |
| Tinker, Tailor | | England | 1695 | The first record of the opening four professions being grouped together is in William Congreve's Love for Love (1695). |
| To market, to market | | England | 1611 | Based upon the traditional rural activity of going to a market or fair. |
| Tom, Tom, the Piper's Son | | Great Britain | 1795 | First published in a chapbook called Tom the Piper's Son. |
| Tweedledum and Tweedledee | | United Kingdom | 1805 | The familiar form of the rhyme was first printed in Original Ditties for the Nursery. |
| Twinkle, Twinkle, Little Star | | United Kingdom | 1806 | Written by Jane Taylor as "The Star" and first published in 1806 in Rhymes for the Nursery. |
| Wee Willie Winkie | | United Kingdom | 1841 | First published in a collection of poems called Whistle-Binkie: Stories for the Social Circle. |
| Where, O Where Has My Little Dog Gone? | 'Der Deitcher's Dog' | United States | 1864 | Joseph Eastburn Winner first published this song as "Der Deitcher's Dog". |
| Who Killed Cock Robin? | 'The Cock Robin Song' | Great Britain | 1744 | First mentioned in Tommy Thumb's Pretty Song Book. |
| Wynken, Blynken, and Nod | 'Dutch Lullaby' | United States | 1889 | Written by American writer and poet Eugene Field and published in 1889. |

== Approximate date ==
| Title | Other titles | Country of origin | Date first recorded | Origin |
|---|---|---|---|---|
| Animal Fair | | United States | c. 1898 | Origin unknown, sung by minstrels and sailors as early as 1898. |
| As I was going by Charing Cross | 'As I was going to Charing Cross' | United Kingdom | c. 1845 | Origin unknown, the rhyme is thought to refer to the equestrian statue of Charles I. |
| As I was going to St Ives | | Great Britain | c. 1730 | Origin unknown, the earliest surviving version was found in a manuscript (Harley MS 7316) dating from approximately 1730. |
| Cock-a-Doodle Doo | | Great Britain | c. 1765 | First full version recorded in John Newbery's Mother Goose's Melody, published in London around 1765 |
| Diddle, Diddle, Dumpling, My Son John | | Great Britain | c. 1797 | The rhyme is first recorded in The Newest Christmas Box published in London around 1797. |
| Eeny, meeny, miny, moe | 'Eenie, Meenie, Minie, Mo' | Unknown (Note: Since many similar counting-out rhymes existed earlier, it is difficult to know this song's exact origin.) | < 1820 | Origin unknown, the rhyme has existed in various forms since well before 1820. |
| Frère Jacques | 'Brother John' | France | c. 1780 | The earliest version of the song's melody is on a French manuscript. |
| Here We Go Round the Mulberry Bush | 'Mulberry Bush', 'This Is the Way' | England | c. 1750 | While the tune is from The Beggar's Opera, this was adapted into a children's game in the mid-nineteenth century. |
| Hey Diddle Diddle | 'Hi Diddle Diddle', 'The Cat and the Fiddle', 'The Cow Jumped Over the Moon' | Great Britain | c. 1765 | First recorded in Mother Goose's Melody around 1765. The rhyme itself may date back to at least the sixteenth century. |
| How Many Miles to Babylon? | | United Kingdom | c. 1801 | Origin unknown, but studies have suggested the rhyme may be older than attested. |
| Jack and Jill | 'Jack and Gill' | Great Britain | c. 1765 | Earliest version recorded in Mother Goose's Melody, published in London around 1765 as a reprint. |
| Jack-a-Nory | | Great Britain | c. 1760 | First recorded in the publication The Top Book of All, for little Masters and Misses around 1760. |
| Jack Be Nimble | | United Kingdom | c. 1815 | This rhyme was first recorded in a manuscript that dates to around 1815. Jumping candles was used as a form of fortune telling and was also a sport. |
| Lavender's Blue | 'Lavender Blue' | England | c. 1675 | The earliest surviving version of the song is in a broadside printed in England between 1672 and 1679. |
| Little Bo-Peep | 'Little Bo-Peep has lost her sheep' | United Kingdom | c. 1805 | This rhyme was first recorded in a manuscript that dates to around 1805. Bo Peep is described in the rhyme as an adult with a short (little) stature. |
| Little Poll Parrot | | United Kingdom | c. 1845 | Origin unknown, this rhyme could possibly date to the seventeenth century. |
| Oh Dear! What Can the Matter Be? | 'Johnny's So Long at the Fair' | Great Britain | c. 1775 | This nursery rhyme was either taken from a manuscript or traces to an earlier folk ballad. It was later put to music in 1792. |
| One for Sorrow | | Great Britain | c. 1780 | "One for Sorrow" was first recorded in Samuel Johnson and George Steevens's 1780 supplement to their 1778 edition of The Plays of William Shakespeare. |
| One, Two, Three, Four, Five | '1, 2, 3, 4, 5' ... 'Once I Caught A Fish Alive' | Great Britain | c. 1765 | First recorded in Mother Goose's Melody around 1765. |
| Pease Porridge Hot | 'Peas Porridge Hot' or 'Pease Pudding Hot' | Great Britain | c. 1760 | The earliest recorded version of "Pease Porridge Hot" is a riddle found in Mother Goose's Melody. |
| Poor Mary | 'Poor Jenny' or 'Poor Sally' | United Kingdom | c. 1885 | Over a hundred known variations have been collected in the United Kingdom since the 1880s. |
| Pretty Little Dutch Girl | | United States | c. 1940 | The earliest known version of 'Pretty Little Dutch Girl' dates to around 1940 in New York. |
| Rock-a-bye Baby | 'Hush a bye Baby', 'Rock a Bye Baby on the treetop' | Great Britain | c. 1765 | First recorded in Mother Goose's Melody around 1765. |
| Round and Round the Garden | | United Kingdom | c. 1945 | Round and Round the Garden dates to 1940 in the United Kingdom and is possibly a version of an older rhyme called "Round about there". |
| See Saw Margery Daw | | Great Britain | c. 1765 | First recorded in Mother Goose's Melody around 1765. |
| Taffy was a Welshman | | Great Britain | c. 1780 | First recorded in Nancy Cock's Pretty Song Book in London around 1780. |
| This Little Piggy | 'This Little Pig Went to Market' | Great Britain | c. 1760 | The first known full version was recorded in The Famous Tommy Thumb's Little Story-Book, which was published in London around 1760. |
| Three Wise Men of Gotham | | Great Britain | c. 1765 | First recorded in Mother Goose's Melody around 1765. |
| The Muffin Man | 'Do you know the muffin man?' | United Kingdom | c. 1820 | The Muffin Man was first recorded in a British manuscript around 1820. Drury Lane is a thoroughfare bordering Covent Garden in London. |
| The Twelve Days of Christmas (Note: The Twelve Days of Christmas is included here as the song appears in numerous nursery rhyme collections. These include: James Orchard Halliwell's Nursery Rhymes of England (1842), Edward Rimbault's Nursery Rhymes (1846), and The Oxford Dictionary of Nursery Rhymes.) | | Great Britain | c. 1800 | The Twelve Days of Christmas was first published in London in Mirth Without Mischief around 1780. |
| Two Little Dickie Birds | 'Two Little Black Birds' | Great Britain | c. 1765 | First recorded in Mother Goose's Melody around 1765. |
| Wind the Bobbin Up | | Netherlands | c. 1895 | English folklorists Iona and Peter Opie traced this rhyme back to the Netherlands in the 1890s. |
| Yankee Doodle | | Thirteen Colonies | c. 1756 | Written at Fort Crailo around 1755 by British Army surgeon Richard Shuckburgh while campaigning in Rensselaer, New York. |

== Unknown date ==
| Title | Other titles | Country of origin | Origin |
|---|---|---|---|
| Ants Go Marching | 'When Johnny Comes Marching Home' | United States | The melody dates to 1863 as 'When Johnny Comes Marching Home'. |
| Bahay Kubo | 'Field House' | Philippines | Tagalog-language folk song from the lowlands of Luzon, Philippines. |
| Chizhik-Pyzhik | 'Чи́жик-Пы́жик' | Russia | Origin unknown, the simple melody is suitable for teaching children to play piano. |
| Dong, Dong, Dongdaemun | '동, 동, 동대문' | Korea | Possibly borrowed from the German carol Lasst uns froh und munter sein. |
| Eeper Weeper | 'Heeper Peeper' | United Kingdom | This may be an older version of "Eeper Neeper" and/or "Peter, Peter, Pumpkin Eater". |
| Five Little Monkeys | '5 Little Monkeys', 'Five Little Monkeys Jumping on the Bed', '5 Little Monkeys Jumping on the Bed' | United States | Origin unknown, this song uses a similar tune to Hush, Little Baby and Shortnin' Bread. |
| Five Little Speckled Frogs | '5 Green & Speckled Frogs' | United States | Origin unknown, this song may date to the mid/late 20th century. |
| Foxy's Hole | | England? | Origin unknown, possibly from the 16th century. |
| Here Comes an Old Soldier from Botany Bay | 'Here Comes an Old Soldier' or 'Old Soldier | Unknown | This nursery rhyme is known in Australia, the United States, and the United Kingdom and dates to at least the late nineteenth century. |
| I Have Two Hands | | Philippines | Origin unknown, this song may date to the early 20th century. |
| Itsy Bitsy Spider | 'The Incey Wincey Spider', 'Incy wincy spider' | United States? | Origin unknown, this song may date to the early 20th century in the United States as early versions were published in Indiana and California. |
| Johnny Johnny Yes Papa | | Unknown | Origin unknown, this song may date to the mid 20th century. |
| Little Arabella Miller | | Unknown | Origin unknown, this song may date to the mid 20th century. |
| Mā is white | | New Zealand | Traditional Māori children's song. |
| Oma Rāpeti | | New Zealand | Traditional Māori children's song. |
| Star Light, Star Bright | | United States | Origin unknown, this song may date to the mid/late 19th century in the United States. |
| Ten in the Bed | 'There were ten in the Bed', '10 in the Bed', 'There were 10 in the bed' | Unknown | Origin unknown, there is a picture book from the United Kingdom dating to 1988 which uses similar lyrics. |
| Ten Green Bottles | 'Ten Green Bottles hanging on the wall', '10 Green Bottles hanging on the Wall', '10 Green Bottles' | United Kingdom | This song appears in The Oxford Song Book as early as 1928 where it's mentioned as a "traditional North country song." |
| Two Tigers | 'Two Little Tigers' or 'Liang Zhi Lao Hu' | China | |
| Weddings and Funerals | | England | |
| What Are Little Boys Made Of? | 'What Are Little Girls Made Of?' | United Kingdom | |
| When I Was a Bachelor | | United States | |
| Where is Thumbkin | | United States | |
