= Tiny Tunes (TV series) =

2026 British TV series

- Genre: Children's television series
- Created by: Flashing Lights Media
- Presented by: Lisa Kelly
- Country of origin: United Kingdom
- Original languages: English; British Sign Language
- No. of episodes: 30

Production
- Executive producer: Camilla Arnold

Original release
- Network: CBeebies
- Release: 4 May 2026

Tiny Tunes is a British children's television programme starring and presented by Lisa Kelly. The series is bilingual, using both English and British Sign Language.

== Synopsis ==
Tiny Tunes is the first CBeebies programme to feature deaf children on screen alongside deaf adults. The series launched on National British Sign Language (BSL) Day. The series is set in the enchanting Tall Trees Forest School. The presenter teaches nursery rhymes to the children using British Sign Language and they do a related activity.

== Development ==
Tiny Tunes was created by Flashing Lights Media and Camilla Arnold serves as executive producer.

== Episodes ==
#	Episode name	Ref.
1	Pop Goes the Weasel	
2	Pat-a-cake	
3	Baa, Baa, Black Sheep	
4	A Sailor Went to Sea	
5	Down in the Jungle	
6	Old MacDonald Had a Farm	
7	London Bridge Is Falling Down	
8	Humpty Dumpty	
9	Five Little Monkeys	
10	The Grand Old Duke of York	
11	This Old Man	
12	Five Little Ducks	
13	Sing a Song of Sixpence	
14	Jack and Jill	
15	Mary Had a Little Lamb	
16	Frère Jacques	
17	When I Was One	
18	Miss Polly Had a Dolly	
19	Oranges and Lemons	
20	Hush Little Baby	
21	Row, Row, Row Your Boat	
22	Head, Shoulders, Knees and Toes	
23	Hush-a-Bye Baby	
24	Here We Go Round the Mulberry Bush	
25	Little Bo-Peep	
26	1, 2, 3, 4, 5, Once I Caught a Fish Alive	
27	I Can Sing a Rainbow	
28	I Hear Thunder	
29	Mary, Mary, Quite Contrary	
30	Twinkle, Twinkle, Little Star	
