= There Was an Old Woman =

"There Was An Old Woman" may refer to:

== Nursery rhyme ==
- "There was an Old Woman Who Lived in a Shoe", a popular English language nursery rhyme
- "There Was an Old Woman Who Lived Under a Hill", a nursery rhyme which dates back to at least its first known printing in 1714

== Other ==
- There Was an Old Woman (novel), 1943 mystery novel by Ellery Queen
- "There Was an Old Woman Who Swallowed a Fly", 1950s children's song by Alan Mills
- "There Was an Old Woman" (The Twilight Zone), 1988 The Twilight Zone television episode

== See also ==
- Old woman (disambiguation)
