= Tiny Toons =

Tiny Toons may refer to:

- Tiny Toon Adventures, 1990-1992 American animated television series
  - Tiny Toon Adventures (video game), 1991 video game based on the TV series
- Tiny Toons Looniversity, 2023-2025 American animated television series

== See also ==
- Tiny Tunes (TV series), 2026 British television series
- Same Old Tunes, 1994 album by Millencolin originally released as Tiny Tunes
