= Needles and Pins =

Needles and Pins may refer to:

- "Needles and Pins" (nursery rhyme), a children's nursery rhyme
- "Needles and Pins" (song), a song written by Jack Nitzsche and Sonny Bono, made famous by the Searchers
- "Needles and Pins", a song by Deftones from their self-titled album
- Needles and Pins (TV series), an American TV series
- A form of paresthesia

== See also ==
- Pins and Needles (disambiguation)
