= There Was a Man in Our Town =

English nursery rhyme

"There Was a Man in Our Town" (Note: Also known as "A Man so Wise", "The Wondrous Wise Man" or "There Was a Man in Thessaly") is an English nursery rhyme originally found in Tommy Thumb's Song Book (1744).

== Rhyme ==
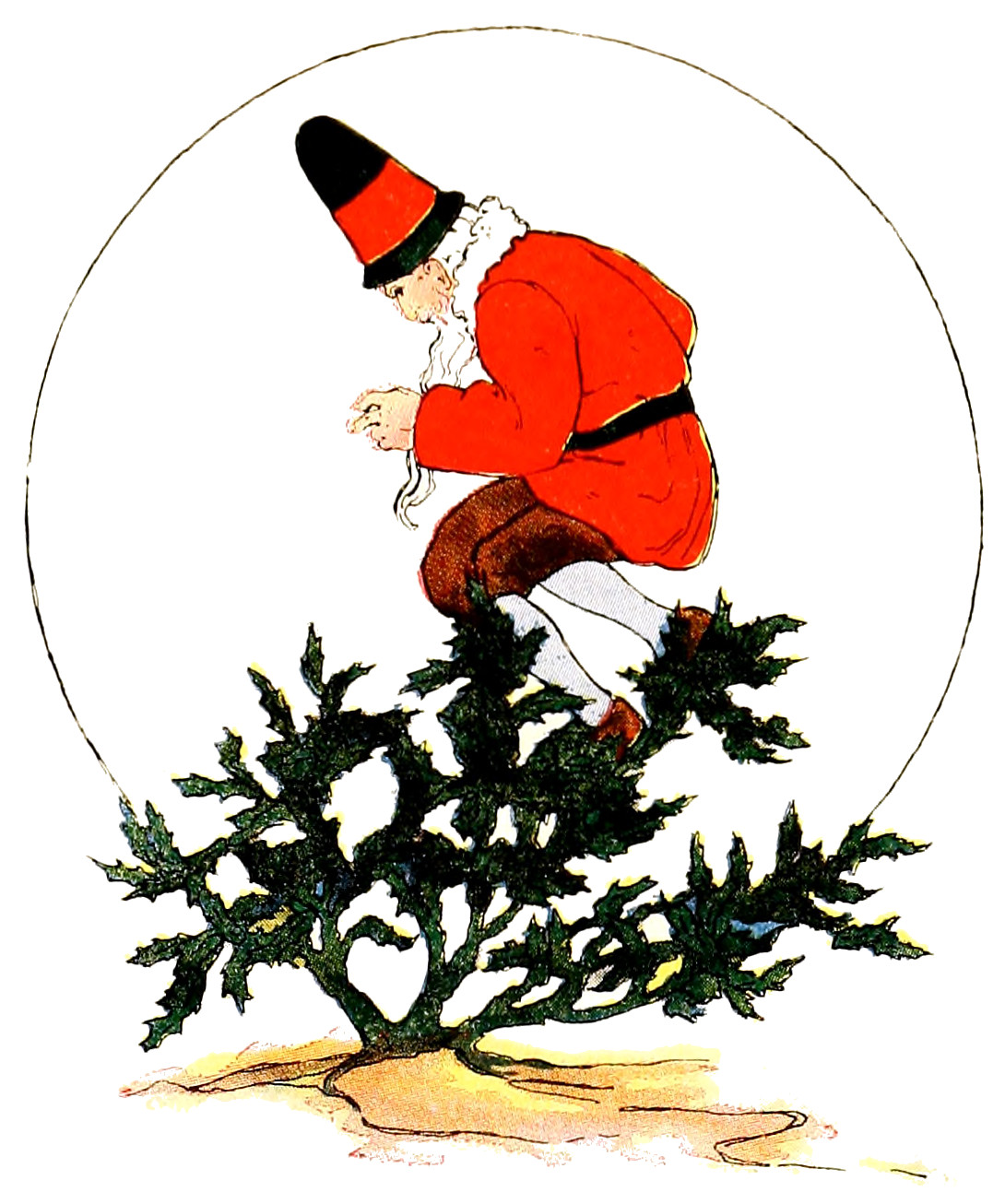
illustration from the Real Mother Goose.

There was a Man so Wise,

He jumpt into A Bramble Bush,

And scratcht out both his Eyes.

And when he saw,

His Eyes where out,

And reason to Complain,

He jumpt into a Quickset Hedge

And Scratcht them in again. (1744)

By the late 1800s, the lyrics were traditionally sung to the tune of Auld Lang Syne.

There was a man in our town, and he was wondrous wise,

He jumped into a bramble-bush, and scratched out both his eyes.

And when he saw his eyes were out, with all his might and main,

He jumped into another bush, and scratched them in again.

There are also many later varieties of the song which use altered or extended lyrics in late 19th century advertising, and a mention in The Harvard Lampoon.

== Reception ==
An anonymous editor from the American satirical magazine Punchinello described "The Wondrous Wise Man" as "graphically drawn" with "no use in moralizing". While they noted that a bramble bush is the last place in the world where a "wise man" is said to be found, the anonymous editor also pointed out the man's wisdom in his own esteem.

== See also ==
- List of nursery rhymes
