= Off-key =

Music not at expected frequency or pitch period

Off-key is musical content that is not at the expected frequency or pitch period, either with respect to some absolute reference frequency, or in a ratiometric sense (i.e. through removal of exactly one degree of freedom, such as the frequency of a keynote), or pitch intervals not well-defined in the ratio of small whole numbers.

The term may also refer to a person or situation being out of step with what is considered normal or appropriate. A single note deliberately played or sung off-key can be called an "off-note". It is sometimes used the same way as a blue note in jazz.

== Explanation of on-key ==
The opposite of off-key is on-key or in-key, which suggests that there is a well defined keynote, or reference pitch. This does not necessarily have to be an absolute pitch but rather one that is relative for at least the duration of a song. A song is usually in a certain key, which is usually the note that the song ends on, and is the base frequency around which it resolves to at the end.

The base-frequency is usually called the harmonic or key center. Being on-key presumes that there is a key center frequency around which some portion of notes have well defined intervals to.

== Deliberate use off-key content ==
In jazz and blues music, certain notes called "blue notes" are deliberately sung somewhat flat for expressive effect. Examples include the words "Thought He Was a Goner" in the song "And the Cat Came Back" and the words "Yum Yum" in the children's song "Five Green and Speckled Frogs".

== See also ==
- Melody
- Tonality
- Blue note
- Tonic (music)
