= Hark, Hark! The Dogs Do Bark =

English nursery rhyme

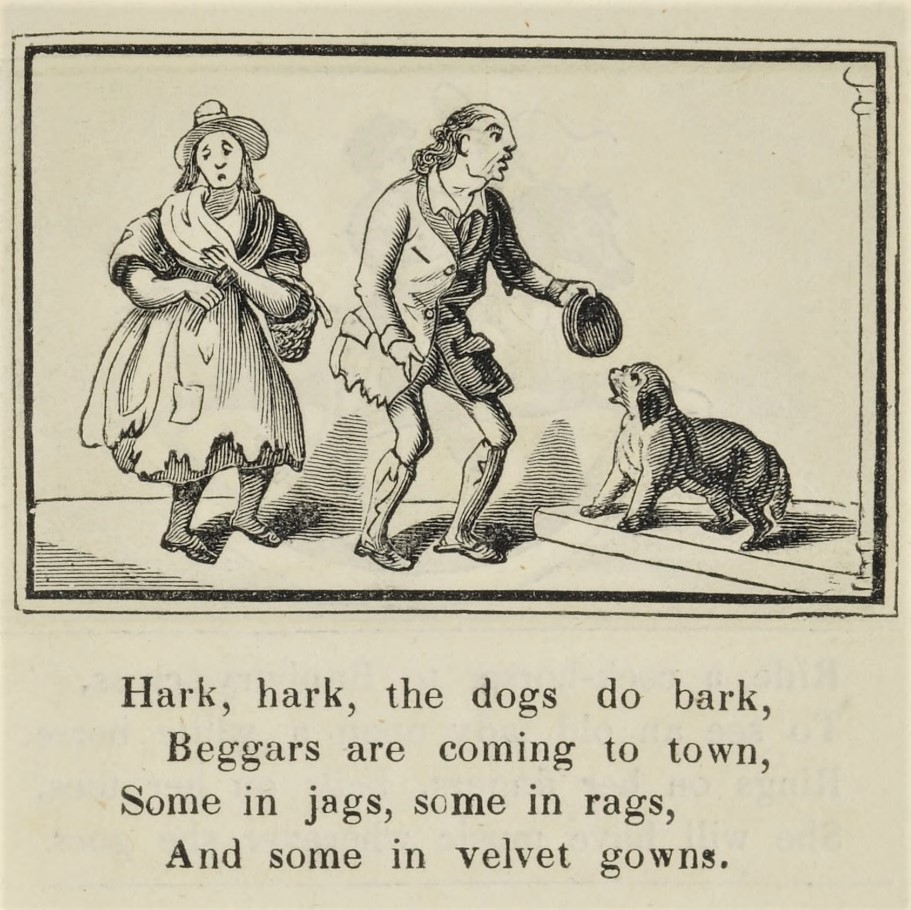
Illustration from Marks's Edition of Nursery Rhymes (published between 1835 and 1857)

"Hark, Hark! The Dogs Do Bark" is an English nursery rhyme. Its origins are uncertain and researchers have attributed it to various dates ranging from the late 11th century to the early 18th century. The earliest known printings of the rhyme are from the late 18th century, but a related rhyme was written down a century earlier than that.

Historians of nursery rhymes disagree as to whether the lyrics of "Hark Hark" were inspired by a particular episode in English history, as opposed to simply reflecting a general and timeless concern about strangers. Those who link the rhyme to a specific episode identify either the Dissolution of the Monasteries during the 1530s, the Glorious Revolution of 1688 or the Jacobite rising of 1715. The most likely origin has it describing the arrival of King James 1st (in his velvet gown) at the English Court together with various impoverished Scottish nobility. Those who date it to the Tudor period of English history (i.e., the 16th century) sometimes look to the rhyme's use of the word jag, which was a Tudor-period word for a fashionable style of clothing. But other historians ascribe no particular relevance to the use of that word.

Informal references to the nursery rhyme attribute the reason to the various enclosures acts whereby large landowners could appropriate smaller holdings merely by fencing them in.

"Hark Hark" survives to this day largely as a nursery rhyme. It has been sufficiently well known to permit writers to invoke it, sometimes in parodied form, in material not intended for children. This includes parodies by literary authors such as James Thurber and D. H. Lawrence. A few prose stories have used the rhyme as their source, including one by L. Frank Baum, author of The Wonderful Wizard of Oz.

The rhyme appears in the Roud Folk Song Index as entry 19,689.

== Lyrics ==
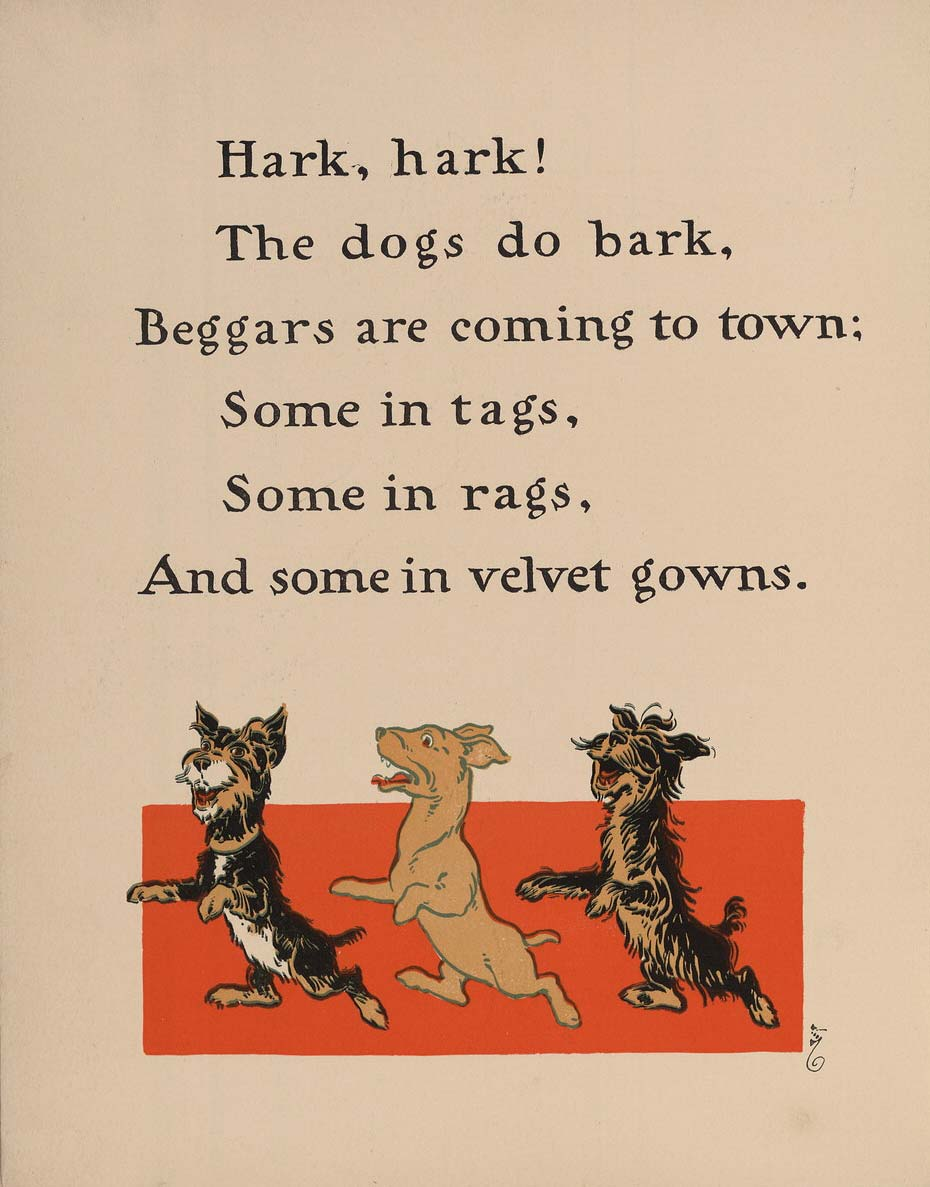
Illustrated lyric from Denslow's Mother Goose (1901)

As commonly published in the early 1800s, the rhyme was:

Hark, hark! the dogs do bark,
Beggars are coming to town.
Some in rags, some in jags,
And some in velvet gowns.

Various published versions incorporate minor grammatical variations. More noticeably, many versions exchange the order of rags and jags; some replace the word jags with tags. A few versions specify that there is only one person wearing a velvet gown; at least one says that the gown material is silken, not velvet.

No particular ordering of rags and jags was dominant in the 19th-century sources. And although the use of tags was less common, it did appear in some of the early 19th-century publications. In Britain, it is found as early as 1832 in an article in Blackwood's Edinburgh Magazine. Even earlier than that, in 1824, it was used in an American book, The Only True Mother Goose Melodies.

Some sources give the rhyme a second verse, whose first two lines are "Some gave them white bread / Some gave them brown". It is unclear why they associate the lines with "Hark Hark", because most sources give them as part of "The Lion and the Unicorn" (a nursery rhyme that is also included in the Roud Folk Song Index, as entry 20,170).

== Initial publications ==
The first publication of the rhyme appears to be the 1788 edition of Tommy Thumb's Song Book. As reported by the Vaughan Williams Memorial Library, the rhyme was included in that text under the title "Hark Hark". It is not known whether it was included in any earlier edition of the Song Book (whose first edition was in 1744). The rhyme saw at least one other pre-1800 publication—the 1784 first edition of Gammer Gurton's Garland. The evidence for this is indirect. It appears in the 1810 second edition of Gammer Gurton's, the Preface of which states that Parts I and II of the book were "first collected and printed by a literary gentleman deceased", but that Parts III and IV "are now first added". "Hark Hark" appears in Part II. The rhyme's appearance in the 1794 edition is corroborated by the Vaughan Williams Memorial Library.

== Origins ==
The origins of "Hark Hark" are uncertain. Various histories of nursery rhymes have offered competing theories on the matter, as have authors who write about other aspects of English history.

One modern history, by Albert Jack, offers two theories of the rhyme's origin, each one dating it to a specific episode in English history. The first theory places it during the Dissolution of the Monasteries in the 1530s. According to the theory, the Dissolution would have caused many people (not just the monks, but others who were economically dependent on the monasteries) to become homeless and to wander through towns seeking assistance. The other theory dates the rhyme to the Glorious Revolution of 1688, in which the Dutch William of Orange took the English throne. In support of this theory, Jack notes that the word "beggar" might have been seen as a play on the name "Beghard", a Dutch mendicant order widespread in Western Europe in the 13th century. Another modern history (by Karen Dolby) presents similar theories. It cites the Glorious Revolution and also admits a possible origin in the Tudor period, though without specifying the Dissolution as the precipitating episode.

An oft-quoted 19th-century compilation of English nursery rhymes, that of James Halliwell-Phillipps, does not offer any theory as to the rhyme's origins. But it classifies "Hark Hark" as a "Relic", even though it classifies others as "Historical".

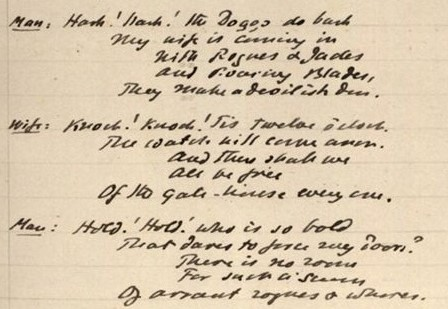
Three verses of a variant of "Hark Hark", from the Westminster Drollery (1672)

Dating the rhyme's origin is confounded by the existence of another that shares the same first line and overall structure. A lyric appearing in a hand-written text from 1672, also titled "Hark, Hark, the Dogs Do Bark", is not a nursery rhyme and does not address beggars. Instead, its first verse reads:

Hark, hark! the dogs do bark,
My wife is coming in,
With rogues and jades and roaring blades,
They make a devilish din.

When discussing a different song in his English Minstrelsie (1895), Sabine Baring-Gould touches upon the 1672 lyric and notes its similarity with the nursery rhyme. However, he states that the nursery rhyme is the later of the two, describing it as a "Jacobite jingle" that arose in the years after the House of Hanover gained the English throne in 1714. But Baring-Gould also notes the similarity of the opening line to one used by Shakespeare in The Tempest—"Hark, hark! the watchdogs bark!". The Tempest is believed to have been written at about 1610.

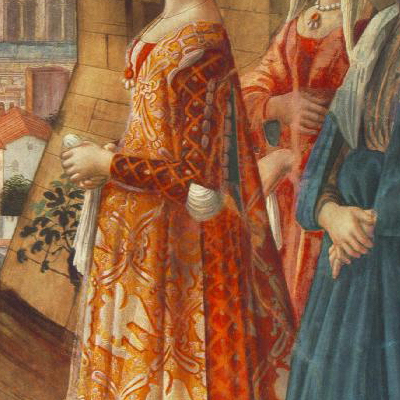
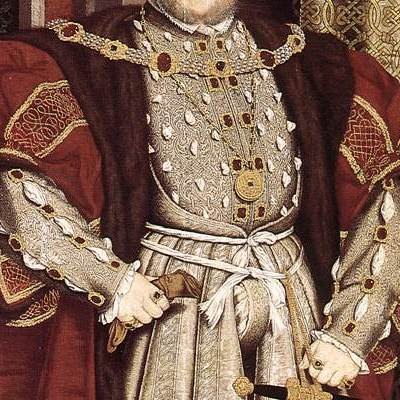
Left: Detail from a painting of a group of Italian women (1480s), showing a single large jag at the elbow of a sleeve.

Right: Detail from a portrait of Henry VIII (1530s), showing numerous small jags cut into the body and sleeves of his doublet, through which "puffs" of the underlying shirt have been pulled through.

The precise meaning of jags might also play a role in dating the rhyme's origins. In the mid-1800s, English provincial dictionaries did not recognize it as a word for any type of garment. But they did recognize the phrase rags and jags, which was understood to mean remnants or shreds of clothing. However, the word had a different clothing-related meaning in earlier centuries. In the 1400s, the word was used to describe a fashion, first popular in Burgundy, of slitting or otherwise ornamenting the borders or hems of a garment. Over time, the word's meaning changed to describe the newer fashion of cutting slashes into the fabric of a garment to reveal the material being worn underneath. With this latter meaning, jags entered the vocabulary of Tudor-era writers. In one of his contributions to the Holinshed's Chronicles (1577), William Harrison used the word to describe current fashions in England—"What should I say of their doublets ... full of jags and cuts". The word was used in the 1594 version of Shakespeare's The Taming of the Shrew, where one character says to a tailor "What, with cuts and jags? ... Thou hast spoil'd the gowne." And in the early 1700s, the anonymous translator of a 1607 book by an Italian writer also used jags in a specific clothing-related sense, linking it to garments made of velvet.

But even amongst historians who date the rhyme to Tudor England, the extent to which their conclusions are based on the Tudor-era meaning of jags is not clear. Historian Reginald James White unequivocally dates it to this period, but does not give a reason and, instead, uses the rhyme as part of his discussion of economic conditions in 16th-century England. Shakespeare historian Thornton Macauley also is certain that the rhyme dates back to this period, but bases that finding on his belief that the "beggars" were understood to be travelling actors. Closer to using the word to date the rhyme to the Tudor period is Linda Alchin's The Secret History of Nursery Rhymes. In her text, Alchin defines the word jags and explicitly links it to Tudor-period fashion. But she does not go so far as to say that the use of the word itself dates the rhyme to that period.

In his 2004 history of nursery rhymes, Chris Roberts discusses several of the varying theories on the origins of "Hark Hark". But he also opines that the rhyme has "a fairly universal theme" that "could be used to describe any time from the Middle Ages to the present day".

In the 1830s, John Bellenden Ker noted that many English sayings and rhymes seem to be gibberish or nonsensical (e.g., "Hickory Dickory Dock"), but proposed that this was the case only because their original meanings have been forgotten. Ker believed those sayings and rhymes to be mis-rememberings of ones that were developed by the native English population in the decades following the Norman conquest in 1066. The rhymes, said Ker, would have been made in the Old English language, but their original meanings could be recovered if the modern words were understood to be sound-alike substitutions for the original. Ker also proposed that the closest known equivalent to Old English was the 16th century version of the Dutch language, and that looking for sound-alike Dutch words would be sufficient for recovering the Old English meanings.

Ker wrote several books exploring this theory, increasingly applying it to rhymes that were not gibberish or nonsensical. "Hark Hark" was addressed in the last of them. When analyzing it, Ker concluded that the word "bark" was a mis-remembering of bije harcke, which he translated as "harasser of the bee" and then assumed "bee" to have been a metaphor that the Anglo-Saxon population used for itself. He also found the word "town" to be a mis-remembering of touwe, meaning "rope", which he assumed to be a metaphor for a hangman's noose. With these and several other similar inferences, Ker found the original meaning of "Hark Hark" to be that of political protest against the Norman government and the Catholic Church (a conclusion he reached with most of the rhymes that he studied). Ker's theory was not well-accepted. In a contemporaneous discussion of it, The Spectator found the theory to be a "delusion" and "the clearest case of literary mania we remember". His writings were still being discussed several decades later, and still not favorably. Grace Rhys called Ker's theory "ingenious if somewhat addlepated". And in the Preface of a facsimile reprint of The Original Mother Goose's Melody, William Henry Whitmore noted Ker's work and added that "opinions differ as to whether he was simply insane on the subject, or was perpetrating an elaborate joke".

== Popular usage ==
"If I were writing about Eben, I'd choose vigorous prose," Jack answered. "Shoot!"

Hark, hark, the dogs do bark.
For Eben is coming to town.
His money in bags, his children in rags,
And his wife in a velvet gown.

"Ho!" hooted Teddy. "That's a parody."

— Excerpt from a 1921 serialized novel

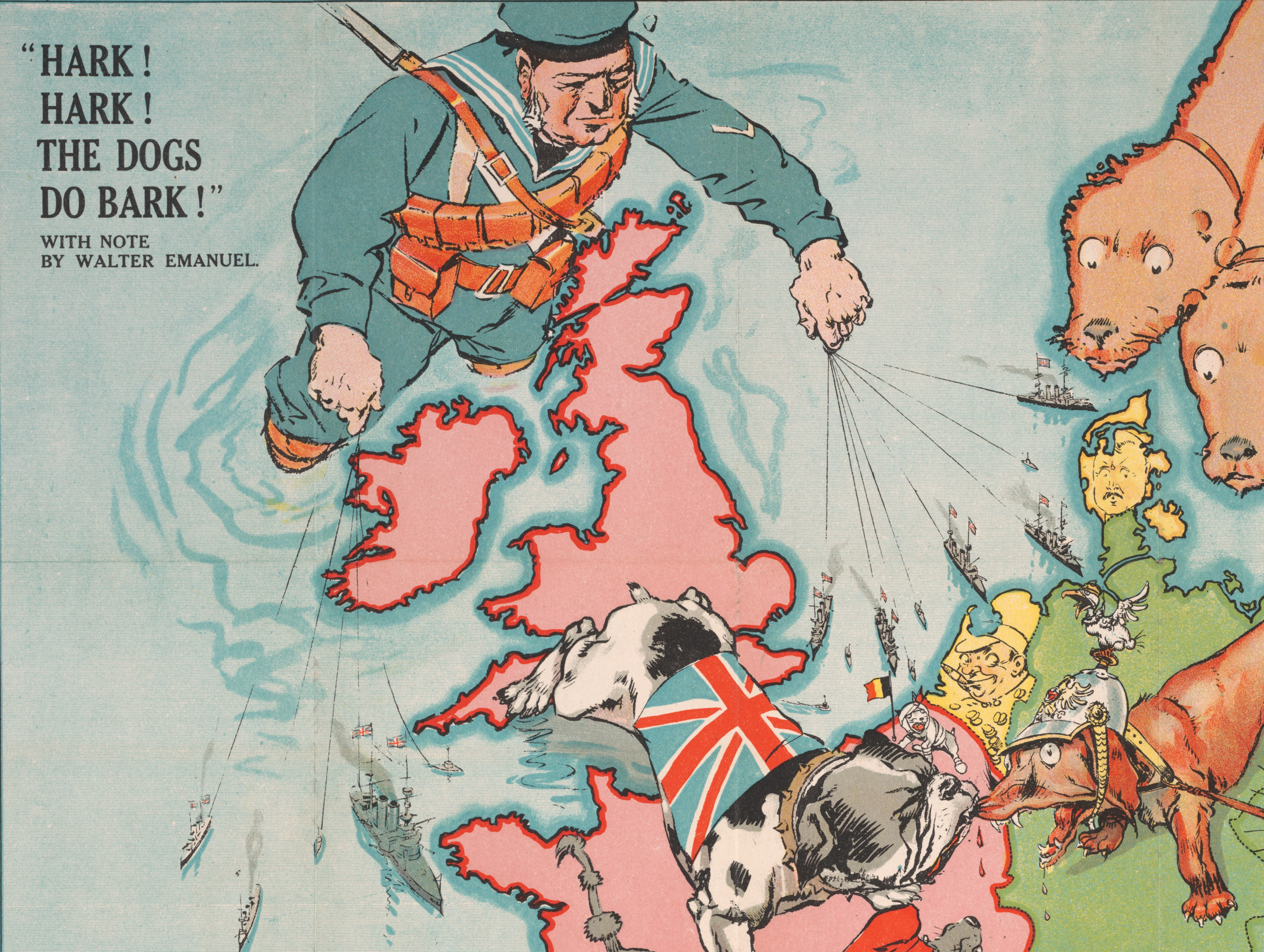
Detail from a 1914 cartoon and satirical map about World War 1

In both England and the United States, the rhyme became so familiar that authors often alluded to it, either in its entirety or to just its first line.

Quoting the entire rhyme, but modifying a few of the words, was sometimes done as a way of making a point. This is how it was used by an anonymous contributor to Blackwood's Edinburgh Magazine, who was commenting on the general character of the Members of Parliament expected to be elected as a result of the soon-to-be enacted Reform Acts of 1832. The contributor wrote that "it will be a strange sight to see the new delegates entering the metropolis, and will perchance remind you of your old nursery rhymes". This was followed with the lyrics to "Hark Hark", but with the line "some in velvet gown" changed to "none in velvet gown" [italics in original]). An 1888 example from the United States sees a similar thing being done in the caption of a political cartoon. The cartoon lampoons Grover Cleveland's position on tariffs and changes the names of the garments to "Italian rags", "German tags" and "English gowns".

Even without modification, the rhyme has served either to illustrate or to emphasize some point being made by the writer. In an 1835 article in Blackwood's, an unidentified contributor linked nursery rhymes to various political issues, using "Hark Hark" in specific reference to the Reform Acts passed in Britain earlier that decade. And the rhyme was used by Theodore W. Noyes in his 1900 journalistic correspondence to the Washington Evening Star to convey his impressions of the Sultan of Sulu's retinue, who were meeting with an American diplomatic delegation.

It has also been used as an epigraph to some larger piece of work. In the 1850s, poet Adeline Dutton Train Whitney used "Hark Hark" to introduce one of her works in Mother Goose for Grown Folks. More recent years have seen the rhyme being used in similar fashion, but not in literary works. Instead, it has appeared a few times as epigraphs to particular chapters in scholarly non-literary texts, including one written by Peruvian economist Hernando de Soto Polar and another by South African journalist Allister Sparks.

The entire rhyme is heard on a loudspeaker in the British children's television series, Teletubbies. The episode is number 148 in season two, and aired in April 1998.

The first line of the rhyme entered the official transcript of the New Zealand House of Representatives in 1953. In September of that year, Eruera Tirikatene was asking a series of questions regarding Māori affairs. At one point, Geoffrey Sim responded to Tirikatene's comments by exclaiming "Hark, hark, the dogs do bark! It is difficult to get a word in," to which Tirikatene responded "You are like a dog barking at the moon." Speaker of the House Matthew Oram immediately re-established order.

In Men At Arms, a novel by Terry Pratchett, "Hark, Hark" is said to be a part of the Charter of the Beggars Guild.

== Adaptations ==
Hark, hark, the dogs do bark.
But only one in three.
They bark at those in velvet gowns,
But never bark at me.

The Duke is fond of velvet gowns,
He'll ask you all to tea.
But I'm in rags, and I'm in tags,
He'll never send for me.

Hark, hark, the dogs do bark,
The Duke is fond of kittens.
He likes to take their insides out,
And use their fur for mittens.

— from The 13 Clocks (1950)

When the Communist Party of Italy was formed in early 1921, writer D.H. Lawrence was living in Sicily and wrote a poem expressing his opinions of the group. The poem, "Hibiscus and Salvia Flowers", starts with a parody of "Hark Hark", reading:

Hark! Hark!
The dogs do bark!
It's the socialists come to town,
None in rags and none in tags,
Swaggering up and down.

Elements of the rhyme recur at various points in the poem. It receives extended critical analysis in Allan Rodway's The Craft of Criticism.

James Thurber's 1950 fantasy novel The 13 Clocks has a prince deliberately trying to get arrested by the evil Duke of Coffin Castle, who has imprisoned a beautiful princess. The prince does this by disguising himself as a wandering minstrel and singing a song whose verses are increasingly critical of the duke. Each verse is a re-working of "Hark Hark".

The rhyme has been used at least twice as the basis for a longer work of prose. Mary Senior Clark used it for a two-part story that appeared in the November and December 1868 issues of Aunt Judy's Magazine, as part of its "Lost Legends of the Nursery Songs" series. And L. Frank Baum (author of The Wonderful Wizard of Oz) used it for his 1897 story "How the Beggars Came to Town". The story appeared in his Mother Goose in Prose and had illustrations by Maxfield Parrish. Both Clark and Baum used the rhyme as an epigraph to the story.

An anonymous author writing in 1872 for Scribner's Monthly used each of the rhyme's lines as the headings of separate sections of a much longer poem, "The Beggars". Each section of the poem was an expansion of the line quoted in the heading. An 1881 publication saw Mary Wilkins Freeman using the rhyme as the basis for a 50-verse poem about the "beggar king" of an army, his daughter and the emperor. Freeman re-used the traditional lines at various portions of the poem.

A parodied two-verse version is recited in the 1977 film The Prince and the Pauper, even though it does not appear in the original novel by Mark Twain.

== Musical recordings ==
The rhyme has appeared on many recordings intended for children (and see the External links section below for a partial listing of such recordings). The earliest known recording appears to be the one done by Lewis Black in the 1920s for the Victor Talking Machine Company. It was part of an "album" of eight 78 rpm discs, collectively titled Songs for Little People. "Hark Hark" is in a medley on the album's third disc (Victor, 216527-A).

Recordings by other notable artists include:

- Derek McCulloch, as Uncle Mac – Nursery Rhymes (No. 4) (His Master's Voice, 7EG 8487). This is a 7-inch extended play record. The year of issue is not known, but McCulloch died in 1967.
- Mike Sammes, as The Michael Sammes Singers – Nursery Rhyme Toys (His Master's Voice Junior, 7EG 108). This is a 7-inch extended play record issued in 1959.
- Wally Whyton – A Treasury of 250 Favourite Children's Songs (Reader's Digest (UK), GFCS 6A-S2). This is a 6-LP box set issued in 1976. "Hark Hark" appears on the second LP.
- Unknown, but attributed to Rupert Bear – Rupert Sings a Golden Hour of Nursery Rhymes (Golden Hour (Pye Records), GH 546). This is an LP issued in 1972.
- It is used as the chorus in Gavin Davenport "Thieves Song" recorded by renowned English folk band Crucible on "Crux" in 2005.

A rock version not intended for children was recorded by Terry Edwards and the Scapegoats in 2008 (Orchestral Pit, OP4). It appears on a 7-inch single as the B-side to "Three Blind Mice". Most of the recording does not feature vocals; the rhyme appears mid-way through the recording.

== Gallery ==
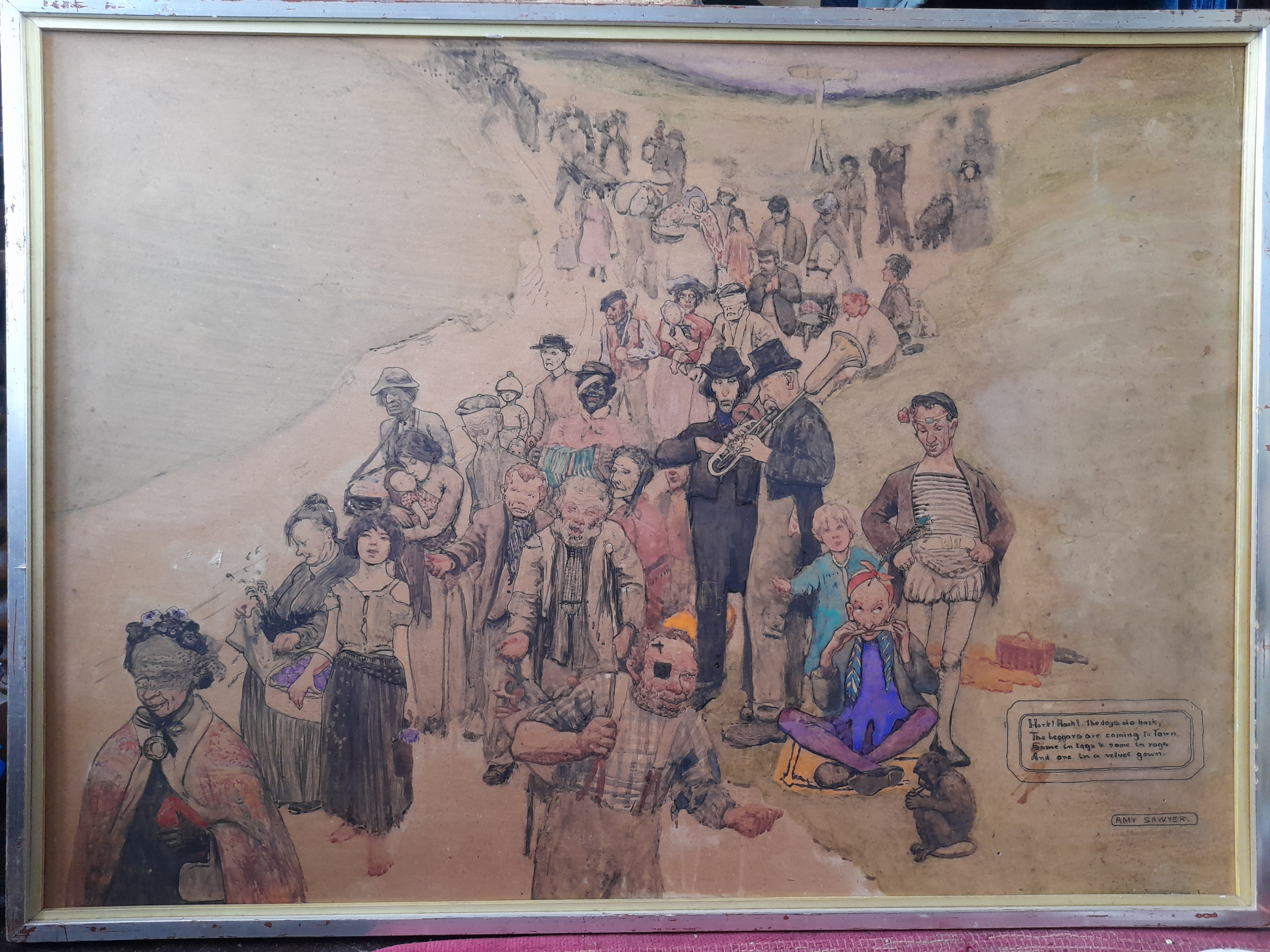
Amy Sawyer (1863-1945) 'Hark Hark' poem of beggars parade. Various characters. Lady at front having 'Subscriptions' on her notebook.
