= Pins and Needles (disambiguation) =

Pins and Needles is a 1937 musical revue.

Pins and Needles may also refer to:

- Pins and needles or paresthesia, a physical sensation of tingling, pricking, or numbness
- Pins and Needles (Birthday Massacre album), or the title song, 2010
- Pins and Needles (Chris Caffery album), or the title song, 2007
- "Pins and Needles" (song), by Opshop, 2010
- "Pins and Needles", a song by the Whites, 1984
- "Pins and Needles (In My Heart)", a song written by Floyd Jenkins (Fred Rose)

== See also ==
- Needles and Pins (disambiguation)
