= Ride a cock horse to Banbury Cross =

English nursery rhyme

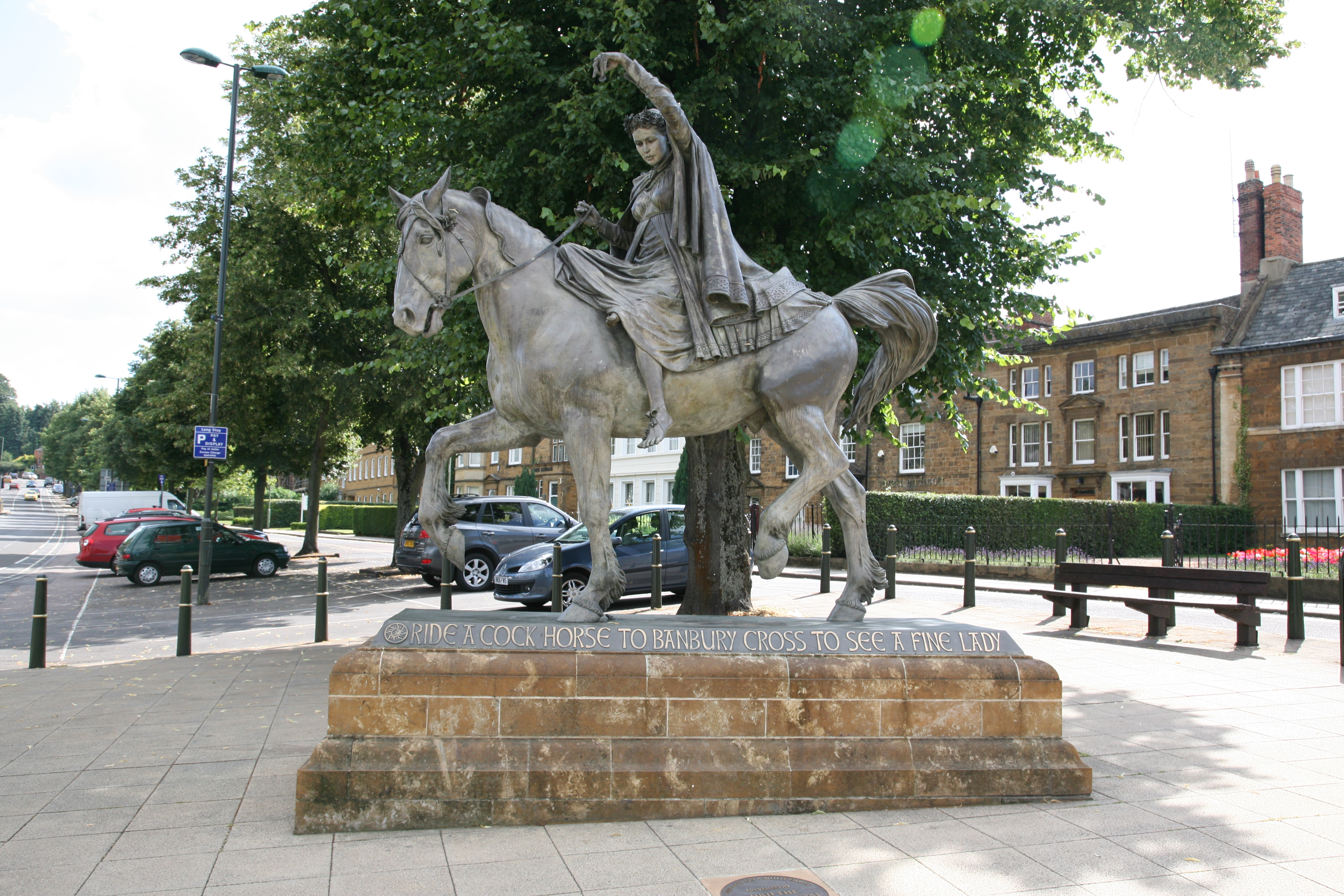
- The statue of the "fine lady" at Banbury Cross

Nursery rhyme
- Published: 1784
- Composer: Traditional

"Ride a Cock Horse to Banbury Cross" is an English language nursery rhyme connected with the English town Banbury in Oxfordshire. It has a Roud Folk Song Index number of 21143.

== Lyrics ==
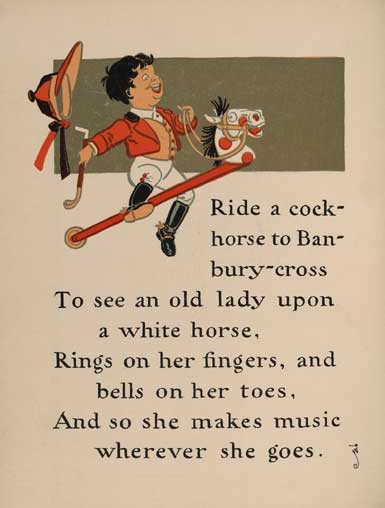
William Wallace Denslow's illustrations, 1901

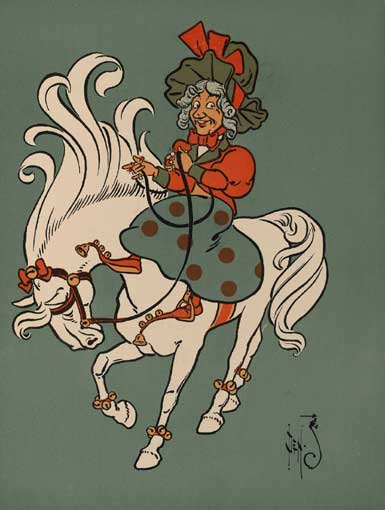
The old lady on her white horse, according to Denslow

Common modern versions include:

Ride a cock-horse to Banbury Cross,
To see a fine lady upon a white horse;
Rings on her fingers and bells on her toes,
And she shall have music wherever she goes.

Alternative version:

Ride a cock-horse to Banbury Cross,
To buy little Johnny a galloping horse;
It trots behind and it ambles before,
And Johnny shall ride till he can ride no more.

== Origins ==
The modern rhyme is the best known of a number of verses beginning with the line "Ride a cock-horse to Banbury Cross", some of which are recorded earlier. These include a verse printed in Tommy Thumb's Pretty Song Book (c. 1744), with the lyrics:

Ride a cock-horse
To Banbury Cross,
To see what Tommy can buy;
A penny white loaf,
A penny white cake,
And a two-penny apple-pie.

A reference in 1725 to 'Now on Cock-horse does he ride' may allude to this or the more famous rhyme, and is the earliest indication we have that they existed. The earliest surviving version of the modern rhyme in Gammer Gurton's Garland or The Nursery Parnassus, printed in London in 1784, differs significantly from modern versions in that the subject is not a fine lady but "an old woman". The version printed in Tommy Thumb's Song Book in America in 1788, which may have been in the original (c. 1744) edition, has the "fine lady", but the next extant version, in The Tom Tit's Song Book (printed in London around 1790), had:

A ring on her finger,
A bonnet of straw,
The strangest old woman
That ever you saw.

== Interpretations ==
The instability of the early recorded lyrics has not prevented considerable speculation about the meaning of the rhyme.

A medieval date had been argued for the rhyme on the grounds that the bells worn on the lady's toes refer to the fashion of wearing bells on the end of shoes in the fifteenth century, but given their absence from so many early versions, this identification is speculative. Similarly, the main Banbury Cross was taken down around 1600, but other crosses were present in the town and, as is often the case, the place may have retained the name, so it is difficult to argue for the antiquity of the rhyme from this fact.

A "cock horse" can mean a high-spirited horse, or the additional horse to assist pulling a cart or carriage up a hill. It can also mean an entire or uncastrated horse. From the mid-sixteenth century it also meant a pretend hobby horse or an adult's knee. There is also an expression "a-cock-horse", meaning "astride". The Cock Hotel, Stony Stratford, of "cock and bull" fame might also have been the supplier of the horse for the leg of the journey to Banbury.

Despite not being present or significantly different in many early versions, the fine lady has been associated with Queen Elizabeth I, Lady Godiva, and Celia Fiennes, whose brother was William Fiennes, 3rd Viscount Saye and Sele (c. 1641–1698) of Broughton Castle, Banbury, on the grounds that the line should be 'To see a Fiennes lady'. There is no corroborative evidence to support any of these cases.

== In popular culture ==
- The historical novel The History of Henry Esmond (1852) by William Makepeace Thackeray compares one character, Isabel, to the "old woman of Banbury Cross..."
- The A.J. Raffles story Le Premier Pas references this nursery rhyme when Raffles describes packing up the gold coins in his pockets so that they wouldn't jangle like the old woman of Banbury Cross.
- The modernist novel Ulysses (1922) by James Joyce features the character Bello uttering the line when ridiculing the main character, Bloom.
- The modernist novel Manhattan Transfer (1925) by John Dos Passos contains a motif of a Great Lady on a White Horse who rides through the city of New York, likely inspired by the reference in Ulysses (novel).
- The dystopian novel Brave New World (1932) by Aldous Huxley contains the adapted form "Streptocock-Gee to Banbury T., to see a fine bathroom and W.C.".
- The journal of the Banbury Historical Society, launched in 1959, is titled Cake and Cockhorse ("cake" referring to Banbury cakes, another association for which the town is well known in the wider world).
- The 1979 Specials cover of the Toots and the Maytals song "Monkey Man" has the following verse

I was on my way to Banbury Cross
Then I see a monkey upon a white horse
With rings on he fingers, bells on him toes
Sing a little song, wherever he be
'Cause he's a monkey, 'cause he's a monkey
'Cause he's a weedy-weedy-tweedy-weedy monkey man

- The poem was recited and mentioned as part of a storyline on American soap opera As The World Turns. Viewers saw the storyline, which featured future Oscar winner Julianne Moore, in late 1986 and early 1987.
- Australian children’s music group The Wiggles have performed a rendition of the rhyme, releasing a version on YouTube in 2025.
