= Gammer Gurton's Garland =

Collection of nursery rhymes

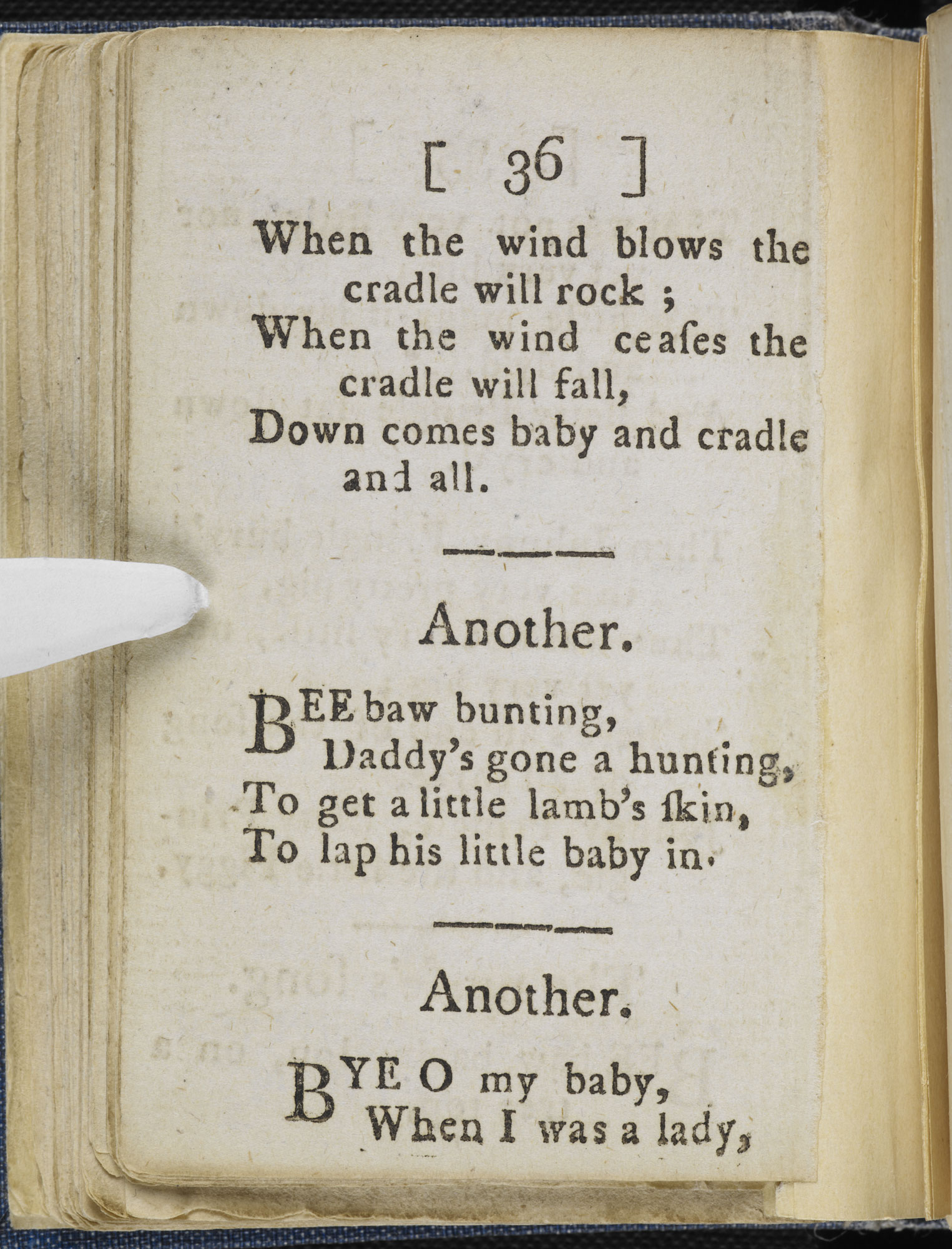
A page from the first edition

Gammer Gurton's Garland: or, The Nursery Parnassus, edited by the literary antiquary Joseph Ritson, is one of the earliest collections of English nursery rhymes. It was first published as a chapbook in 1784, but was three times reprinted in expanded editions during the following century, as were several unrelated children's books with similar titles. Gammer Gurton's Garland put into print for the first time some of our best-known nursery rhymes.

== Publication history ==
Joseph Ritson was a young London antiquary, originally from Stockton-on-Tees, whose interests were in the early 1780s turning towards nursery rhymes. In 1781 he bought a copy of the pioneering collection Mother Goose's Melody, and the following year encouraged his nephew to note down any such rhymes he came across. In 1784 (Note: The first edition bears no date, and in the past some scholars have dated it 1783 or c.1783–1784, but Ritson's own later reference to it as a 1784 publication answers the question beyond reasonable doubt.) his Gammer Gurton's Garland: or, The Nursery Parnassus, containing 79 nursery rhymes, was published by the Stockton bookseller R. Christopher as a 32mo chapbook priced at twopence. Only one copy is known to survive, now held in the British Library. An undated second edition was later published, in which three of the original rhymes were left out, and replaced by four others. A third edition, published in 1810, seven years after Ritson's death, reprinted the 79 rhymes from the first edition and added a further 55. A major contributor to this volume, and very likely its editor, was the literary scholar Francis Douce. A fourth edition, limited to 112 copies, was published in Glasgow in 1866. There are several modern reprints.

== Significance ==
Gammer Gurton's Garland has been called one of the four foundational collections of English nursery rhymes, the others being Nancy Cock's Song-Book (1744), Tommy Thumb's Pretty Song-Book (1744), and Mother Goose's Melody (1780). Ritson knew the last of these and incorporated about two-thirds of its rhymes into his own collection, sometimes in variant versions, along with many that had never been printed before. Among the well-known nursery rhymes published for the first time in Ritson's original edition of Gammer Gurton's Garland are

- "Bye, baby bunting"
- "Ride a cock-horse to Banbury Cross
- "Hark, hark, the dogs do bark"
- "Goosey, goosey gander"
- "I see the moon"
- "See-saw, Margery Daw"
- "The rose is red, the violet blue"
- "There was an old woman who lived in a shoe"
- "The man in the moon"

Other rhymes of which it gives early texts include

- "Hush-a-bye, baby, on the tree top"
- "Baa, baa, black sheep"
- "Cock a doodle doo!"
- "Ding, dong, bell"
- "A frog he would a-wooing go"
- "Three wise men of Gotham"
- "Hey diddle diddle"
- "Jack and Jill went up the hill"
- "Little Jack Horner"
- "Ladybird, ladybird"
- "London Bridge is broken down"
- "Mary, Mary, quite contrary"
- "One, two, three, four, five"
- "Pat-a-cake, pat-a-cake, baker's man"
- "Sing a song of sixpence"
- "Taffy was a Welshman, Taffy was a thief"
- "Little Tommy Tucker"
- "Pussy Cat, Pussy Cat, wilt thou be mine"

== Gammer Gurton ==
The name Gammer Gurton was not originated by Ritson. It first appears in the 16th-century comedy Gammer Gurton's Needle, and from there it came to be used as the name of the typical grandmother.

In the early 19th century appeared a number of children's books naming Gammer Gurton in their titles, some of which have been mistakenly attributed to Joseph Ritson. These include Gammer Gurton's Garland of Nursery Songs, and Toby Tickle's Collection of Riddles (undated, but perhaps 1810); Gammer Gurton's Pleasant Stories (1846); Gammer Gurton's Famous Histories (undated, but perhaps 1846), a work later reissued as Gammer Gurton's Story Books; and Gammer Gurton's Garland (undated), a collection of 12 nursery rhymes beginning with "Jenny Wren fell sick" and ending with "London Bridge is broken down". All of these apart from the first can be securely attributed to William John Thoms.
