= Wind the Bobbin Up =

Nursery rhyme
- Published: 1890s
- Songwriter: Unknown

"Wind the Bobbin Up" is a Dutch children's nursery rhyme and singing game. The song has since been translated to English and introduced to the United Kingdom and abroad.

== Lyrics ==
Among modern lyrics is:

Wind the bobbin up,
Wind the bobbin up,
Pull, pull, clap, clap, clap.
Wind it back again,
Wind it back again,
Pull, pull, clap, clap, clap,
Point to the ceiling,
Point to the floor,
Point to the window,
Point to the door,
Clap your hands together, 1, 2, 3,
And place them gently upon your knee.

== Origins ==
Iona and Peter Opie traced this rhyme back to Netherlands in the 1890s. When they were collecting games in the 1960s and 1970s the version they encountered was:

Wind the bobbin up,
Wind the bobbin up,
Pull, pull,
Tug, tug, tug.

== The game ==
In the 1970s the game involved two players winding fists around each other. At "Pull, Pull" they pushed their fists away from each other and when "Tug, Tug" was reached they pulled their elbows back. It has now become a much more sedate action game, often with small children carrying out the actions in the lyrics.

== See also ==
- List of nursery rhymes
