= Green Gravel =

English folk song

Song
- Published: c. 1835
- Genre: Singing game
- Songwriter(s): Unknown

Green Gravel is an English singing game and folk song. It has a Roud Folk Song Index number of 1368.

== Lyrics and performance ==
The version collected in Manchester in 1835:

Green gravel, green gravel, the grass is so green
The fairest young damsel that was ever seen
O Mary, O Mary, your true love is dead
He sent you a letter to turn around your head...

The players joined hands and walk around in a ring. At the end of the text, one person is named and then stays in the ring but faces outwards; the song begins again and a different person is named at the end, then taking their place in the centre. Lucy Broadwood and J. A. Fuller Maitland recorded in their 1893 book English County Songs that Green Gravel was a dramatic representation of mourning.

== See also ==
- List of nursery rhymes
