= Roses Are Red =

Love poem and children's rhyme

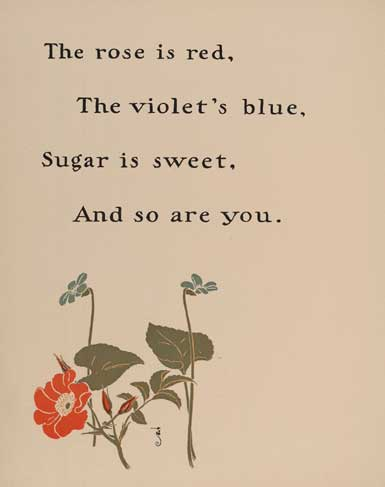
- William Wallace Denslow's illustrations for "The rose is red", from a 1901 edition of Mother Goose

Nursery rhyme

"Roses Are Red" is a love poem and children's rhyme with Roud Folk Song Index number 19798. It has spawned multiple humorous and parodic variants.

A modern standard version is:

Roses are red
Violets are blue,
Sugar is sweet
And so are you.

== Origins ==
The rhyme builds on poetic conventions that are traceable as far back as Edmund Spenser's epic The Faerie Queene of 1590:

It was upon a Sommers shynie day,
When Titan faire his beames did display,
In a fresh fountaine, farre from all mens vew,
She bath'd her brest, the boyling heat t'allay;
She bath'd with roses red, and violets blew,
And all the sweetest flowres, that in the forrest grew.

A rhyme similar to the modern standard version can be found in Gammer Gurton's Garland, a 1784 collection of English nursery rhymes published in London by Joseph Johnson:

The rose is red, the violet's blue,
The honey's sweet, and so are you.
Thou are my love and I am thine;
I drew thee to my Valentine:
The lot was cast and then I drew,
And Fortune said it shou'd be you.
