= I Love Little Pussy =

Poem

Nursery rhyme
- Published: 1830
- Songwriter: Traditional

"I Love Little Pussy", alternatively called "I Love Little Kitty", is an English language nursery rhyme about a person who loves their pet cat. It has a Roud Folk Song Index number of 12824.

== Lyrics and melody ==
The most common modern version is:

I love little pussy,
Her coat is so warm,
And if I don't hurt her,
She'll do me no harm.
So I'll not pull her tail,
Nor drive her away,
But pussy and I,
Very gently will play.

Additional lines include:

She shall sit by my side
And I'll give her some food;
And pussy will love me
Because I am good.
I'll pat pretty pussy,
And then she will purr;
And thus show her thanks
For my kindness to her.

I'll not pinch her ears,
Nor tread on her paw,
Lest I should provoke her
To use her sharp claw.
I never will vex her
Nor make her displeased:
For pussy can't bear
To be worried and teased.

The melody commonly associated with the rhyme was first recorded by the composer and nursery rhyme collector James William Elliott in his National Nursery Rhymes and Nursery Songs (1870).

== Origins ==
The poem is first recorded in The Child's Song Book published in 1830. It has been attributed to Jane Taylor (1783–1824), as it conforms to her style. However, there is no corroborative evidence to support this case.

== Controversy ==
Usage of the word "pussy" as a vulgar slang term for the vagina is documented since the late 17th century. The rhyme's title and lyrics have been changed by some publications to replace the word "pussy" with the word "kitty", among other substitute terms. A heavily innuendo-laden variant of the rhyme appears in Adrian Mole: The Wilderness Years (1993) by Sue Townsend.
