= Goosey Goosey Gander =

English nursery rhyme

"Goosey Goosey Gander" is an English-language nursery rhyme. It has a Roud Folk Song Index number of 6488.

== Lyrics ==
The most common modern version of the lyrics is:

Goosey goosey gander,
Whither shall I wander?
Upstairs and downstairs
And in my lady's chamber.
There I met an old man
Who wouldn't say his prayers,
So I took him by his left leg
And threw him down the stairs.

== History and alternative versions ==
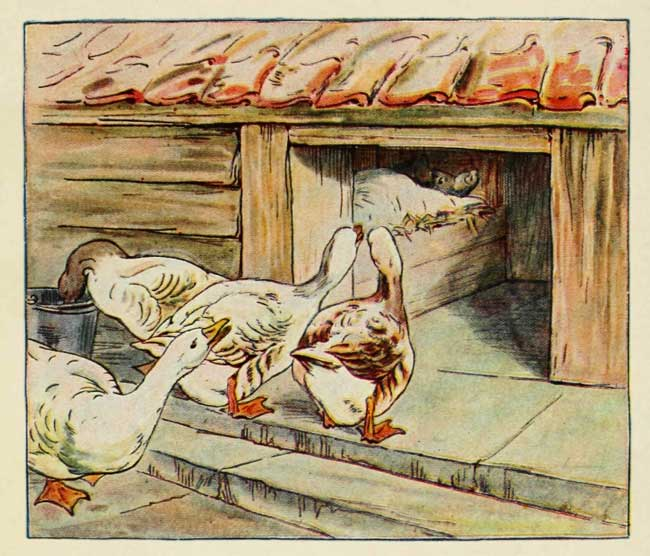
Illustration by Beatrix Potter in Cecily Parsley's Nursery Rhymes (1922)

The earliest recorded version of this rhyme is in Gammer Gurton's Garland or The Nursery Parnassus published in London in 1784. Like most early versions of the rhyme it does not include the last four lines:

Goose-a goose-a gander,
Where shall I wander?
Up stairs and down stairs,
In my lady's chamber;
There you'll find a cup of sack
And a race of ginger.

Some versions have the additional concluding lines:

The stairs went crack,
He nearly broke his back.
And all the little ducks went,
'Quack, quack, quack'.

Iona and Peter Opie note records of a separate rhyme referring to the Crane fly recorded from about 1780, which they suggest may have been amalgamated with this rhyme in the early nineteenth century:

Old father Long-Legs
Can't say his prayers:
take him by the left leg,
And throw him downstairs.

== Interpretations ==
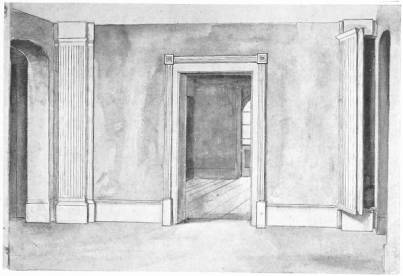
The concealed entrance to a priest hole in Partingdale House, Middlesex (in the right pilaster)

Some have suggested that this rhyme refers to priest holes—hiding places for itinerant Catholic priests during the persecutions under King Henry VIII, his children Edward, Queen Elizabeth and, later, under Oliver Cromwell. Once discovered the priest would be forcibly taken from the house ('thrown down the stairs') and treated badly. Amateur historian Chris Roberts suggests further that the rhyme is linked to the propaganda campaign against the Catholic Church during the reign of Henry VIII. "left leg" was a slang term for Catholics during the reign of Edward VI. "Can't say his prayers" could refer to the banning of Latin prayers and the mandate to use the English-language Book of Common Prayer. It has been retroactively stated that Cromwell's roundheads were known to goose step, so "Goosey" could refer to them.. However, the "goose step" march was created by the Prussian army in the 18th century, a full century after Cromwell's army.

Other interpretations exist. Mark Cocker and Richard Mabey note in Birds Britannica that the greylag goose has for millennia been associated with fertility, that "goose" still has a sexual meaning in British culture, and that the nursery rhyme preserves these sexual overtones ("In my lady's chamber"). "Goose" was a British term for prostitutes, and "bitten by a goose" was a reference to visible symptoms of STIs; Chris Roberts thus argues that the "wandering" refers to the spread of STIs.
