= When I Was a Bachelor =

Song

"When I Was a Bachelor" is an English nursery rhyme.

== Lyrics ==
One of the most commonly used modern versions of the rhyme is:

When I was a bachelor I lived by myself,
And all the bread and cheese I got I laid upon the shelf;
The rats and the mice, they made such a strife,
I had to go to London to buy me a wife.

The streets were so bad and the lanes were so narrow,
I was forced to bring my wife home in a wheelbarrow.
The wheelbarrow broke and my wife had a fall;
Down came wheelbarrow, little wife and all.
