= Hickory Dickory Dock =

Popular children's song

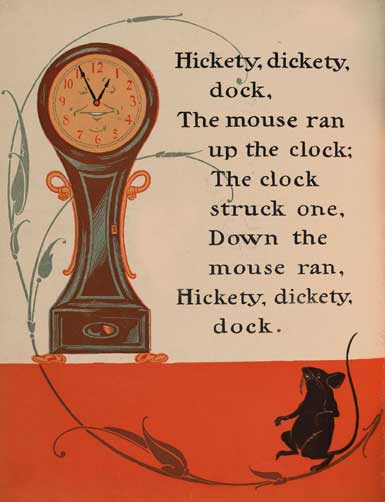
- Illustration by William Wallace Denslow, from a 1901 Mother Goose collection

Nursery rhyme
- Published: 1744
- Songwriter: Traditional

"Hickory Dickory Dock" or "Hickety Dickety Dock" is a popular English-language nursery rhyme. The Roud Folk Song Index number is 6489.

== Lyrics and music ==
The most common modern version is:

Hickory dickory dock.
The mouse ran up the clock.
The clock struck one,
The mouse ran down,
Hickory dickory dock.

Other variants include "down the mouse ran" or "down the mouse run" or "and down he ran" or "and down he run" in place of "the mouse ran down". Other variants have non-sequential numbers, for example starting with "The clock struck ten, The mouse ran down" instead of the traditional "one".

== Origins and meaning ==
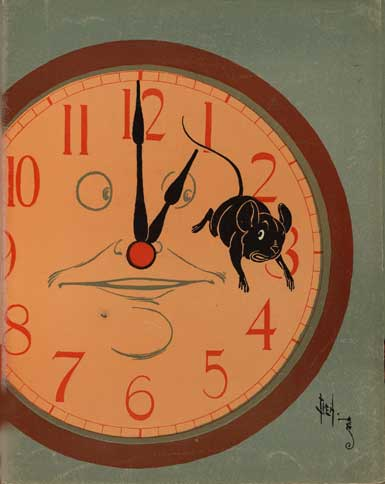
Hickety Dickety Dock, illustrated by Denslow

The earliest recorded version of the rhyme is in Tommy Thumb's Pretty Song Book, published in London in May 1744, which uses the opening line: 'Hickere, Dickere Dock'. The next recorded version in Mother Goose's Melody (c. 1765), uses 'Dickery, Dickery Dock'.

The rhyme is thought by some commentators to have originated as a counting-out rhyme. Westmorland shepherds in the nineteenth century used the numbers Hevera (8), Devera (9) and Dick (10) which are from the Cumbric language.

The rhyme is thought to have been based on the astronomical clock at Exeter Cathedral. The clock has a small hole in the door below the face for the resident cat to hunt mice.

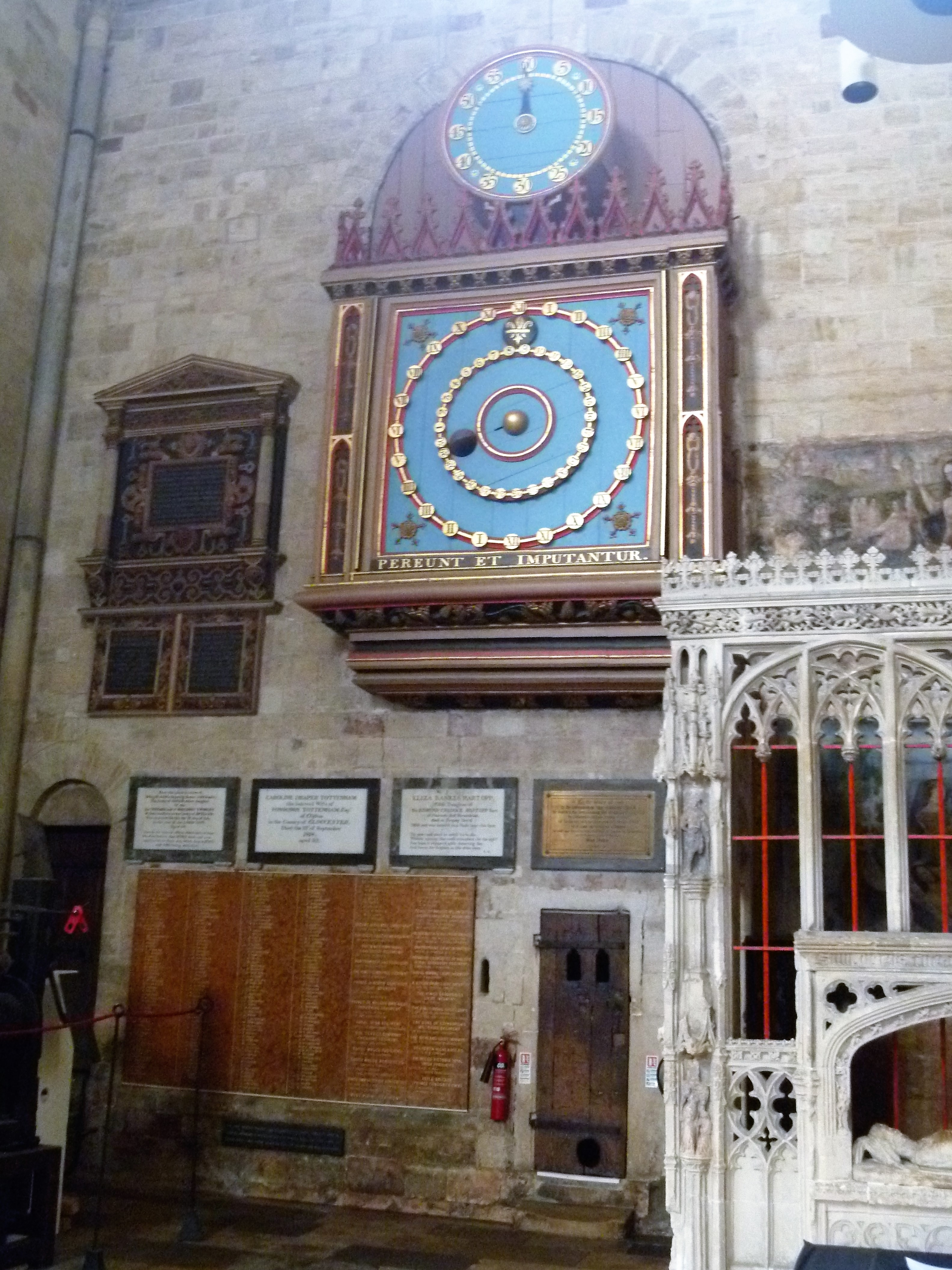
The Exeter Cathedral astronomical clock, thought to be referenced in the rhyme.

== See also ==
- Yan Tan Tethera
- Chiastic structure
- List of nursery rhymes
- Hickory, Dickory, and Doc
