= There Was an Old Woman Who Lived Under a Hill =

Nursery rhyme

"There was an old woman lived under a hill"

Nursery rhyme
- Released: 1714

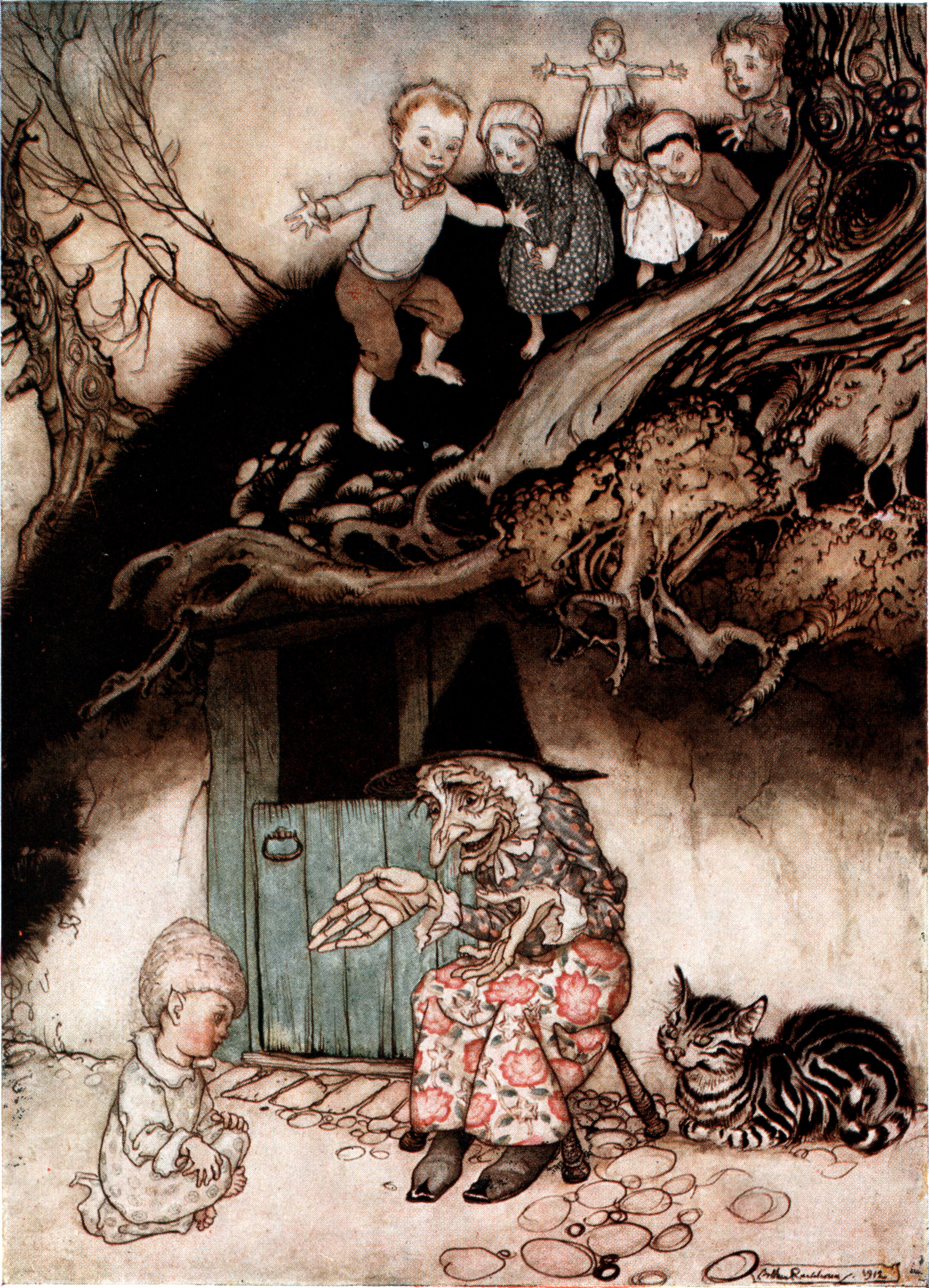
Illustration of the rhyme by Arthur Rackham.

"There was an old woman lived under a hill" is a nursery rhyme which dates back to at least its first known printing in 1714. It has a Roud Folk Song Index number of 1613.

== Lyrics ==
There was an old woman lived under the hill,
And if she's not gone she lives there still.
Baked apples she sold, and cranberry pies,
And she's the old woman that never told lies.

== Origins and development ==
In 1714 these lines:

There was an old woman
Liv'd under a hill,
And if she ben't gone,
She lives there still—

appeared as part of a catch in The Academy of Complements. In 1744 these lines appeared by themselves (in a slightly different form) in Tommy Thumb's Pretty Song Book, the first extant collection of nursery rhymes. The final lines first appeared in print c. 1843. One eighteenth-century editor, possibly Oliver Goldsmith, added a note: "This is a self evident Proposition which is the very Essence of Truth. 'She lived under the hill, and if she is not gone she lives there still', Nobody will presume to contradict this."

The 1810 edition of Gammer Gurton's Garland included a variant.

Pillycock, Pillycock, sate on a hill,
If he's not gone—he sits there still.

Edgar, in Shakespeare's King Lear, appears to refer to this version when he says "Pillycock sat on Pillycock hill," which indicates that the rhyme was known as early as the first decade of the seventeenth century.
