= Foxy's Hole =

Nursery rhyme

"Foxy's Hole" is a nursery rhyme for children that is played as a game.

== Origin ==
Foxy's Hole is thought to originate from the Tudor period.

== Lyrics ==
The lyrics are as follows:

Put your finger in Foxy's hole
Foxy's not at home
Foxy's out at the back door
Picking at a bone

The game involves the adult catching the child's finger in a clenched fist, which represents Foxy's "hole".
