= Five Little Monkeys =

Children's counting song

"Five Little Monkeys Sitting in a Tree" variant in both English and Spanish.

"Five Little Monkeys" is an English-language nursery rhyme, children's song, folk song and fingerplay of American origin. It is usually accompanied by a sequence of gestures that mimic the words of the song. Each successive verse sequentially counts down from the starting number.

The most common version of the song has a similar tune to the Austrian folk song "Wie Böhmen noch bei Öst'rreich war" and the American folk song Hush, Little Baby. Alternative versions have similar tunes to the first verse of the 1890s folk song "Shortnin' Bread."

== Lyrics ==
One version of the lyrics, published in the 2015 collection No More Monkeys, runs:

Five little monkeys jumping on the bed,
One fell off and bumped his head,
Mama called the doctor and the doctor said,
"No more monkeys jumping on the bed!"

Four little monkeys jumping on the bed,
One fell off and bumped her head,
Mama called the doctor and the doctor said,
"No more monkeys jumping on the bed!"

Three little monkeys jumping on the bed,
One fell off and bumped his head,
Mama called the doctor and the doctor said,
"No more monkeys jumping on the bed!"

Two little monkeys jumping on the bed,
One fell off and bumped her head,
Mama called the doctor and the doctor said,
"No more monkeys jumping on the bed!"

One little monkey jumping on the bed,
He fell off and bumped his head,
Mama called the doctor and the doctor said,
"No more monkeys jumping on the bed!"

=== Variations ===
Alternative versions of the song change the last verse to "one fell off" or "she fell off".

An additional final verse includes lines such as:

No little monkeys jumping on the bed,
None fell off or bumped their heads,
Mama called the doctor and the doctor said,
"Put those monkeys back to bed!"

The last line can also be replaced in various ways, such as "That's what you get for jumping on the bed!"

== Gestures ==
The song can be performed with gestures to accompany each verse, such as:

- Hold up a number of fingers equal to the number of monkeys and bounce them onto the palm of the other hand;
- Hold head;
- Put your pinky finger to your cheek and thumb to your ear (as if using a telephone);
- Wag your index finger

== Influence ==
Eileen Christelow has written a series of books titled "Five Little Monkeys ..". She acknowledges that she did not write the original lyrics, she heard it from her daughter. Four of these books would later be adapted into a stage play by Ernie Nolan.

In 2021, Filipino TikToker Amor Carias, also known by her stage name "Miss Catering", performed a cover of "Five Little Monkeys", this time with lyrics mashed up from "Humpty Dumpty", "Twinkle, Twinkle, Little Star" and possibly "Three Little Kittens", along with Tagalog-language "Tagu-taguan maliwanag ang buwan", "I wanna be a tutubi" and "Pen Pen de Sarapen", plus the song "Upuan" by Gloc-9 and Zelle vocalist Jeazell Grutas.

Five little monkeys, Humpty Dumpty
Mama called the doctor and the doctor said,
'Pag bilang kong tatlo, nakatago na kayo
Kayo po na nakaupo, subukan mong tumayo
I wanna be a tutubi a twinkle star
Haw-haw de carabao de batuten
Meow!

== See also ==
- Ten Little Indians
