= Three Little Kittens =

Nursery rhyme

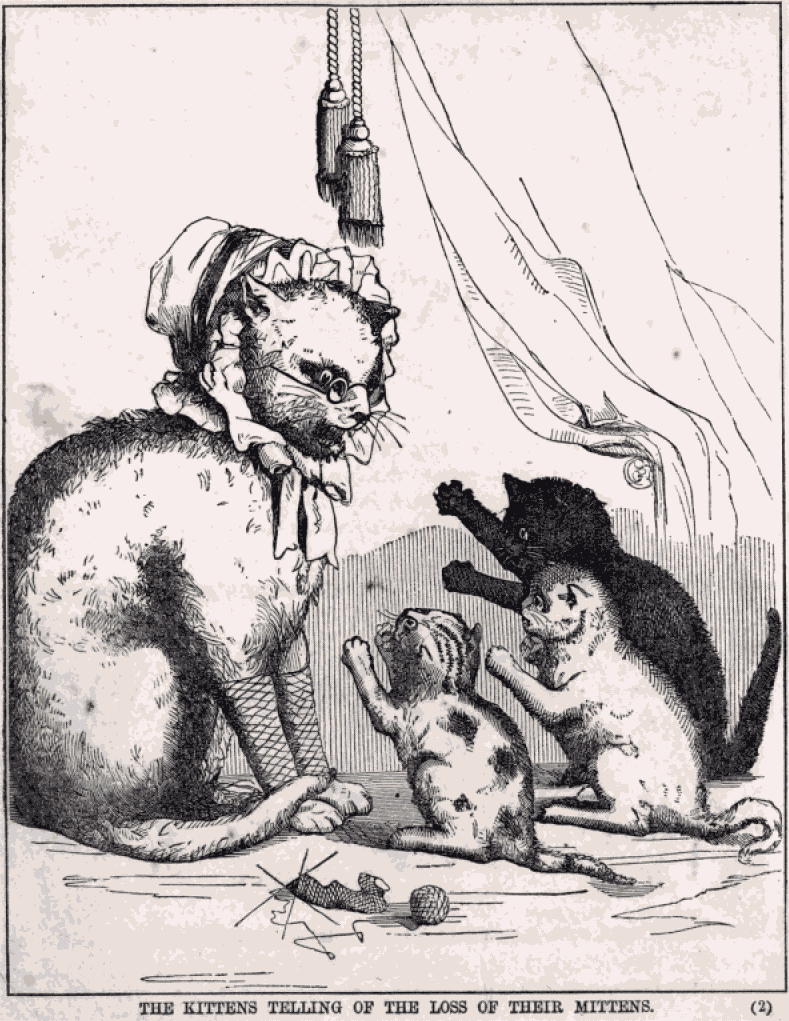
- Illustration from Ballantyne's 1858 version

Nursery rhyme
- Published: 1833
- Songwriter: Eliza Lee Cabot Follen

"Three Little Kittens" is an English language nursery rhyme, in all likelihood with roots in the British folk tradition. The rhyme as published today however is a sophisticated piece usually attributed to American poet Eliza Lee Cabot Follen (1787–1860). With the passage of time, the poem has been absorbed into the Mother Goose collection. The rhyme tells of three kittens who first lost, then find and soak, their mittens. When all is finally set to rights, the kittens receive their mother's approval and some pie. It has a Roud Folk Song Index number of 16140.

The poem was published in London in 1827 in a satirical review by Willhelm Ewart Gladstone, writing as Bartholomew Bouverie, in The Eton Miscellany.

A version was later published in England in 1833 as an anonymous addition to a volume of Follen's verse. Follen may have developed and refined an existing, rude version of the poem, and, in the process, made it her own. The poem is a sophisticated production that avoids the typical moralization of 19th century children's literature in favour of metamorphic fantasy, satirical nonsense, and word play.

== Text ==
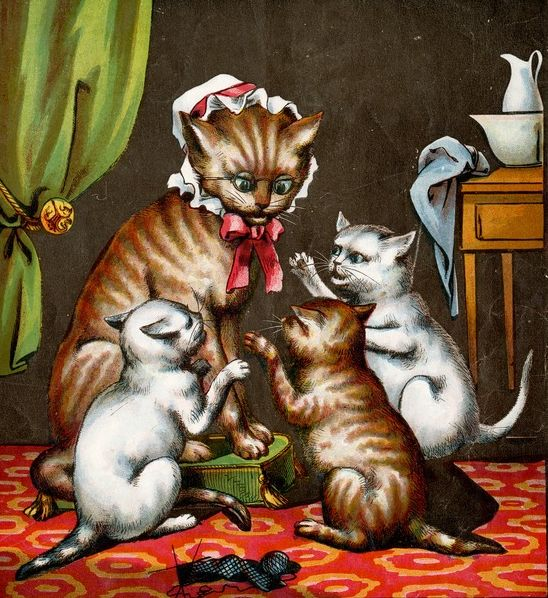
Illustration of the rhyme from 1874

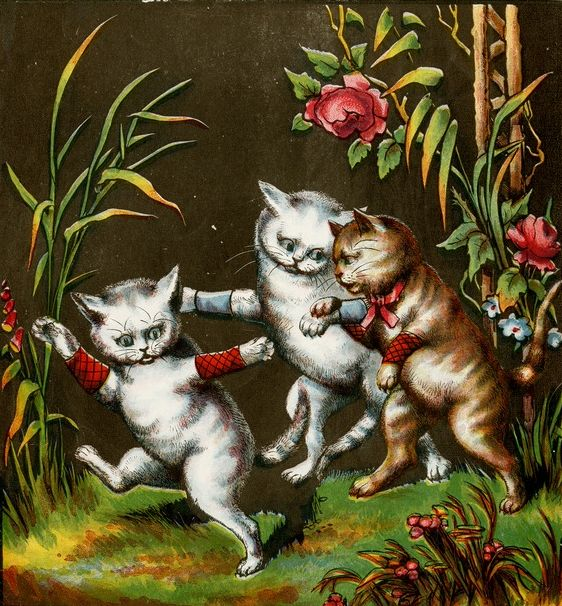
The kittens playing in the garden, an illustration from 1874

The cat and her kittens
They put on their mittens,
To eat a Christmas pie.
The poor little kittens
They lost their mittens,
And then they began to cry.

"O mother dear, we sadly fear
We cannot go to-day,
For we have lost our mittens."
"If it be so, ye shall not go,
For ye are naughty kittens."

From Gladstone, The Eton Miscellany (London: 1827)

Three little kittens lost their mittens;
And they began to cry,
Oh! mother dear,
We very much fear
That we have lost our mittens.
LOST YOUR MITTENS!
YOU NAUGHTY KITTENS!
THEN YOU SHALL HAVE NO PIE.
Mee-ow, mee-ow, mee-ow.
NO, YOU SHALL HAVE NO PIE.
Mee-ow, mee-ow, mee-ow.

The three little kittens found their mittens,
And they began to cry,
Oh! mother dear,
See here, see here,
See, we have found our mittens.
PUT ON YOUR MITTENS,
YOU SILLY KITTENS,
AND YOU MAY HAVE SOME PIE.
Purr-r, purr-r, purr-r.
O, let us have the pie,
Purr-r, purr-r, purr-r.

The three little kittens put on their mittens,
And soon ate up the pie;
Oh! mother dear,
We greatly fear,
That we have soil’d our mittens.
SOIL'D YOUR MITTENS!
YOU NAUGHTY KITTENS!
Then they began to sigh,
Mi-ow, mi-ow, mi-ow.
Then they began to sigh,
Mi-ow, mi-ow, mi-ow.

The three little kittens washed their mittens,
And hung them out to dry;
Oh! mother dear,
Do not you hear,
That we have wash'd our mittens.
WASH'D YOUR MITTENS!
OH! YOU'RE GOOD KITTENS,
BUT I SMELL A RAT CLOSE BY:
HUSH! HUSH! MEE-OW, MEE-OW.
We smell a rat close by,
Mee-ow, mee-ow, mee-ow.

From Follen, New Nursery Songs for All Good Children (London: 1860)

== Background ==
According to Janet Sinclair Gray, author of Race and Time, "Three Little Kittens" may have origins in the British folk tradition, but the poem as known today is a sophisticated production far removed from such origins. Gray supports her assertion by pointing out that the cats are not the barnyard felines of folk material but bourgeois domestic cats who eat pie and wear mittens. Gray observes that the mother cat's disciplinary measures and the kittens' need to report their movements to her are also indicators of a bourgeois status.

"Three Little Kittens" is attributed to Bostonian Sunday school teacher and abolitionist, Eliza Lee Cabot Follen (1787–1860), a member of a prominent New England family and the author of the juvenile novel The Well-Spent Hour. Gray explains that "Kittens" is unlike any of Follen's typical poems, but also notes that Follen is just the sort of person who would write such a piece. It is unlikely Follen composed "Kittens" wholecloth, Gray believes, but rather far more likely that she developed and refined an existing but rude version of the piece. In doing so, she made the poem her own. Although Follen disclaimed authorship following the poem's first appearance in print, she continued to publish it under her name in succeeding years.

== Publication ==
Three Little Kittens
Tune for Three Little Kittens

The first example of the poem found in print is in The Eton Miscellany (London: 1827).

A later version was published in Follen's Little Songs, for Little Boys and Girls, the Boston edition being published in 1833 by Leonard C. Bowles. The poem was appended to the English edition, probably inserted by the publisher. In the introduction to the 1856 edition of Little Songs, Follen states that the poem was by some unknown hand. This edition subtitles the poem, "A Cat's Tale, with Additions". Subsequent editions following her death in 1860, omitted any such disclaimer. The poem was first published in America in 1843 in Follen's New Nursery Songs for All Good Children.

Cuthbert Bede (pen name of Edward Bradley) published a prose version in his Fairy Fables (London: 1857).

In Boston 1858, R. M. Ballantyne published his prose version which elaborated on Follen's poem in a volume of the Good Little Pig's Library. This version included numerous illustrations and a musical setting for the poem.

== Reception ==
"Three Little Kittens" was hugely popular and quickly absorbed into the Mother Goose collection. Unlike her female literary contemporaries who typically stressed moral edification in their children's pieces, Follen subordinated such edification in "Three Little Kittens" and emphasized fantasy involving anthropomorphic characters, verbal play, and satirical nonsense. The poem is considered a cornerstone in the shift from moral literature for children to romantic literature intended to amuse and entertain.

== See also ==
- The Milky Way (1940 film)
- List of nursery rhymes
