= Little Arabella Miller =

English nursery rhyme

"Little Arabella Miller" is a nursery rhyme and action song of unknown origin sung to the tune of "Twinkle Twinkle Little Star".

== Origin ==
While the exact origin of Little Arabella Miller is unknown, a woman named Ann Eliott has been previously cited as a composer. The song dates to at least 1971, as its mentioned in "Games for the Very Young: Finger Plays and Nursery Games" by Elizabeth Mary Matterson. It's later mentioned in "Finger Plays and Action Verses for Children" (1977) by Dorothy Pinsky.

== Lyrics ==
The rhyme has just one verse but there are several variants which focus on the description of the caterpillar (furry, fuzzy, woolly), and on the family members mentioned in the rhyme (mother, brother, baby brother).

Little Arabella Miller
Found a furry caterpillar
First it climbed upon her mother
Then upon her baby brother
"Ugh" said Arabella Miller
"Take away that caterpillar!"

Alternative version:

Little Arabella Miller
Had a fuzzy caterpillar.
First it climbed upon her mother,
Then upon her baby brother.
They said, " Arabella Miller,
Put away your caterpillar!"

== Actions ==
Little Arabella Miller
Found a wooly caterpillar (wiggle one finger)
First it crawled upon her mother (tickle mom)
Then upon her baby brother (tickle a friend)
Take away that caterpillar!" (shake finger)
