= Five Little Speckled Frogs =

Nursery rhyme

"Five Little Speckled Frogs" is a traditional nursery rhyme of unknown origin. This song is meant to teach children subtraction, in this case by describing frogs jumping off of a log into a pool, one by one.

== Origin ==
"Five Little Speckled Frogs" dates to at least 1978 as it's mentioned in a "Preschool Recreation Enrichment Program" manual for the state of Maryland. Author Thomas McCavour though states in his book Verses Old and New that the "origin and author of this rhyme are unknown".

== Lyrics ==
A recording of a single verse of the song "Five Little Speckled Frogs," with the viola playing the vocal portion

One version of the song is:

== Hand motions ==
There are hand motions children may use to participate during the song.

- Line #1: By show of fingers, hold up the number of frogs sitting on the log.
- Line #2: Draw in your hands close to your chest and curl your fingers downward, facing the floor as though you are a frog perched atop a log.
- Line #3: Mimic eating while you sing 'Eating some most delicious bugs', then rub your belly delightfully while singing 'yum, yum!'.
- Line #4: Hold one finger up to represent the frog who fell off the log.
- Line #5: Pretend to fall over.
- Line #6: By a show of fingers, hold up the number of frogs still remaining on the log while singing "Now there are four little speckled frogs". Upon singing "(glub, glub)", repeat the same movement as in the second line except look upward as though you were a frog underneath water.
