= There Was an Old Woman Who Lived in a Shoe =

English language nursery rhyme

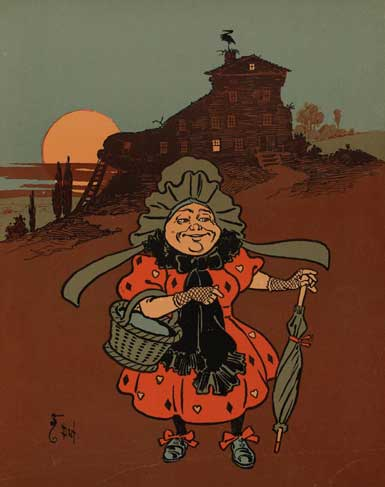
- Illustration by W. W. Denslow, from a 1901 edition of Mother Goose

Nursery rhyme
- Published: 1784
- Songwriter: Unknown

"There Was an Old Woman Who Lived in a Shoe" is a popular English language nursery rhyme, with a Roud Folk Song Index number of 19132. Debates over its meaning and origin have largely centered on attempts to match the old woman with historical female figures who have had large families, although King George II (1683–1760) has also been proposed as the rhyme's subject.

== Lyrics ==
The most common version of the rhyme is:

There was an old woman who lived in a shoe.
She had so many children, she didn't know what to do.
She gave them some broth without any bread;
Then whipped them all soundly and put them to bed.

The earliest printed version in Joseph Ritson's Gammer Gurton's Garland in 1784 has the coarser last line:

She whipp'd all their bums, and sent them to bed.

Many other variations were printed in the 18th and 19th centuries. Marjorie Ainsworth Decker published a Christian version of the rhyme in her The Christian Mother Goose Book published in 1978:

There was an old woman
Who lived in a shoe,
She had so many children,
And loved them all, too.
She said, "Thank you Lord Jesus,
For sending them bread."
Then kissed them all gladly
and sent them to bed.

== Origins and meaning ==
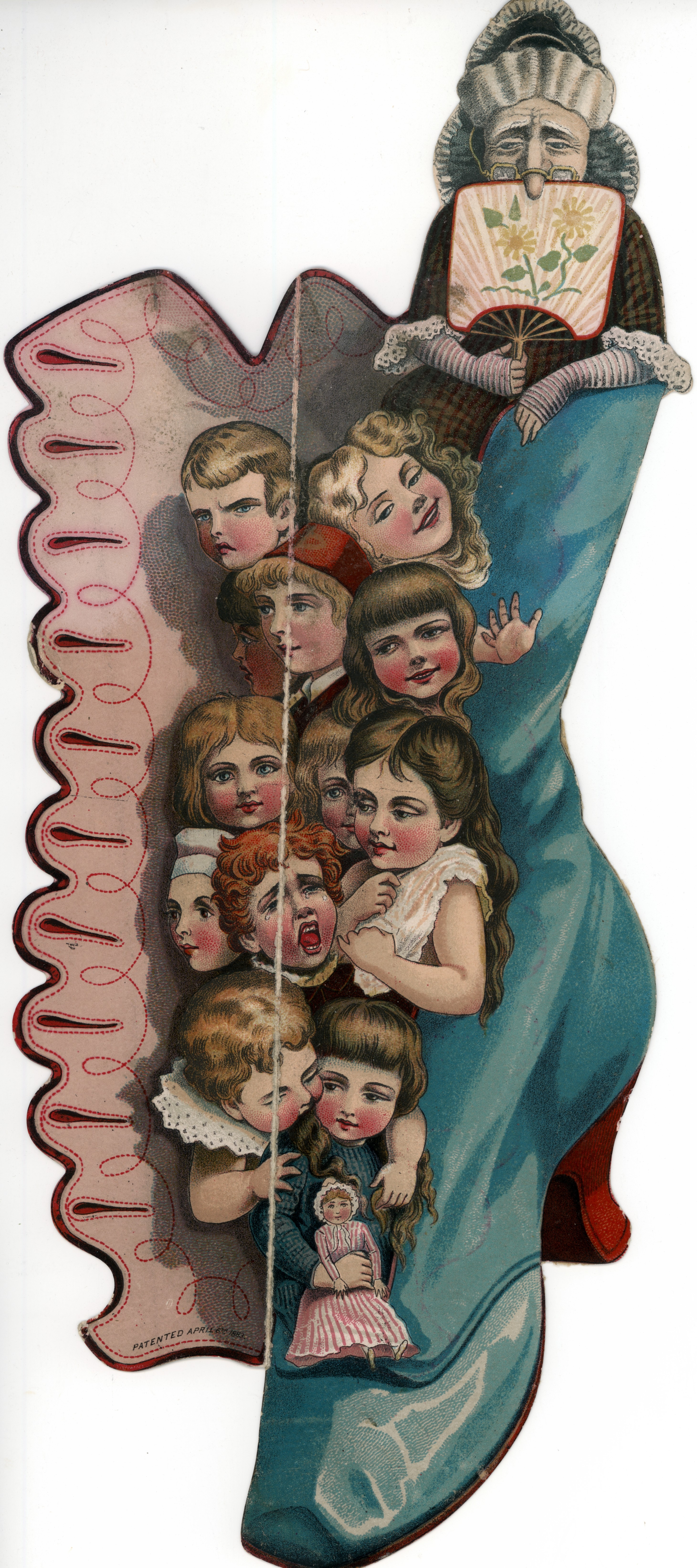
Folding card, 1883

Iona and Peter Opie pointed to the version published in Infant Institutes in 1797, which finished with the lines:

Then out went th' old woman to bespeak 'em a coffin,
And when she came back, she found 'em all a-loffeing.

The term "a-loffeing", they believe, was Shakespearean, suggesting that the rhyme is considerably older than the first printed versions. They then speculated that if this were true, it might have a folklore meaning and pointed to the connection between shoes and fertility, perhaps exemplified by casting a shoe after a bride as she leaves for her honeymoon, or tying shoes to the departing couple's car. Archaeologist Ralph Merifield has pointed out that in Lancashire it was the custom for females who wished to conceive to try on the shoes of a woman who had just given birth.

Debates over the meaning of the rhyme have largely revolved around matching the old woman with historical figures, as Peter Opie observed "for little reason other than the size of their families". Candidates include Queen Caroline, the wife of King George II (1683–1760), who had eight children, and Elizabeth Vergoose of Boston, who had six children of her own and ten stepchildren. Some evidence suggests the rhyme refers to the wife of Feodor Vassilyev of Shuya, Russia, who reportedly birthed 69 children during her lifetime (1707 – c.1782).

Irish folklorist Tomás MacCormaic suggests that the rhyme is a celebration of the Land Goddess (Mother Nature) and is a play on the Old Irish word 'Sidhbhrog', which translates as 'Fairy House'. The Irish word for Fairies is 'Sidhe', while 'Brog' translates as both 'House' and 'Shoe'.

Albert Jack has proposed a political origin for the rhyme. George II was nicknamed the "old woman", because it was widely believed that Queen Caroline was the real power behind the throne. (Note: The idea that George II was dominated by his queen is expressed in this contemporary verse: You may strut, dapper George, But it will be in vain; We all know it is Queen Caroline Not you that reign.) According to this explanation, the children are the Members of Parliament (MPs) that George was unable to control, the whip refers to the political office of that name – the MP whose role is to ensure that members of his party vote according to the party line – and the bed is the House of Commons, which MPs were required to attend daily. The phrase "gave them some broth without any bread" may refer to George's parsimony in the wake of the South Sea Bubble of 1721, and his attempts to restore his own and the country's finances.
