= Needles and Pins (nursery rhyme) =

English nursery rhyme

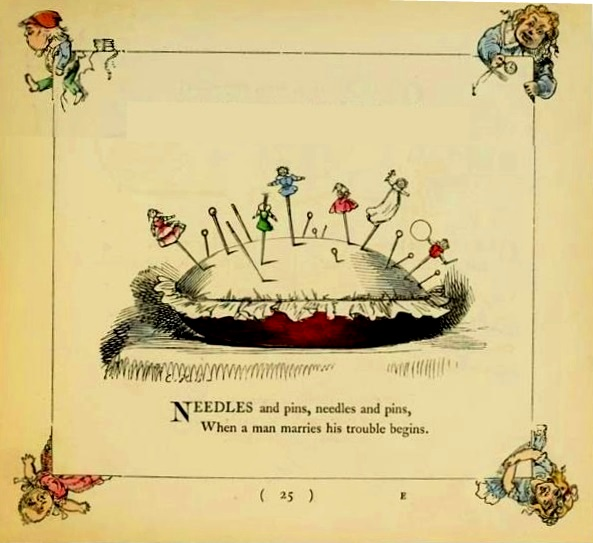
Charles H. Bennett's illustration of the rhyme from 1858

"Needles and Pins" is an English language proverb and nursery rhyme and was first recorded in the proverbs section of James Orchard Halliwell's The Nursery Rhymes of England (1842). Since then it has appeared largely unchanged in many other collections of nursery rhymes. Its usual form is

Needles and pins, needles and pins,
When a man marries, his trouble begins,

and it has a Roud Folk Song Index number of 20071.
