= Miss Polly Had a Dolly =

American children's song

- song
- Other name: Miss Molly Had a Dolly, Miss Polly
- Genre: Children's song Nursery rhyme
- Written: Unknown
- Language: English
- Published: 1986

"Miss Polly Had a Dolly" also known as "Miss Polly Had a Little Dolly", "Miss Polly" or "Miss Molly Had a Dolly" is an English-language nursery rhyme, folk song, children's song and action song of Scottish origin. It has a Roud Folk Song Index number of 16289.

== Background ==
"Miss Polly Had a Dolly" is a popular nursery rhyme and children's song about a little girl named Miss Polly and a little dolly who was sick and calls the doctor to come and help. The song was published as early as 1986 by Maureen Sinclair in Glasgow, Scotland.

== Lyrics ==
The most common version of the song lyrics are:

Miss Polly had a dolly who was sick, sick, sick.
So she called for the doctor to come quick, quick, quick.
The doctor came with his bag and his hat,
And he knocked on the door with a rat-a-tat-tat.
He looked at the dolly and he shook his head.
And he said, "Miss Polly, put her straight to bed."
He wrote on the paper for a pill, pill, pill.
"I'll be back in the morning with the bill, bill, bill."

"Mister Polly had a dolly who was sick, sick, sick.
So he called for the doctor to come quick, quick, quick.
The doctor came with her bag and her hat,
And she knocked on the door with a rat-a-tat-tat.
She looked at the dolly and she shook her head.
And she said, "Mister Polly, put her straight to bed."
She wrote on the paper for a pill, pill, pill.
"I'll be back in the morning with the bill, bill, bill."

Miss Molly had a dolly who was sick, sick, sick.
So she called for the doctor to come quick, quick, quick.
The doctor came with his bag and his hat,
And he knocked on the door with a rat-a-tat-tat.
He looked at the dolly and he shook his head.
And he said, "Miss Molly, put her straight to bed."
He wrote on the paper for a pill, pill, pill.
"I'll be back in the morning with the bill, bill, bill."

== See also ==
- Miss Lucy had a baby
