= One, Two, Three, Four, Five =

Traditional nursery rhyme

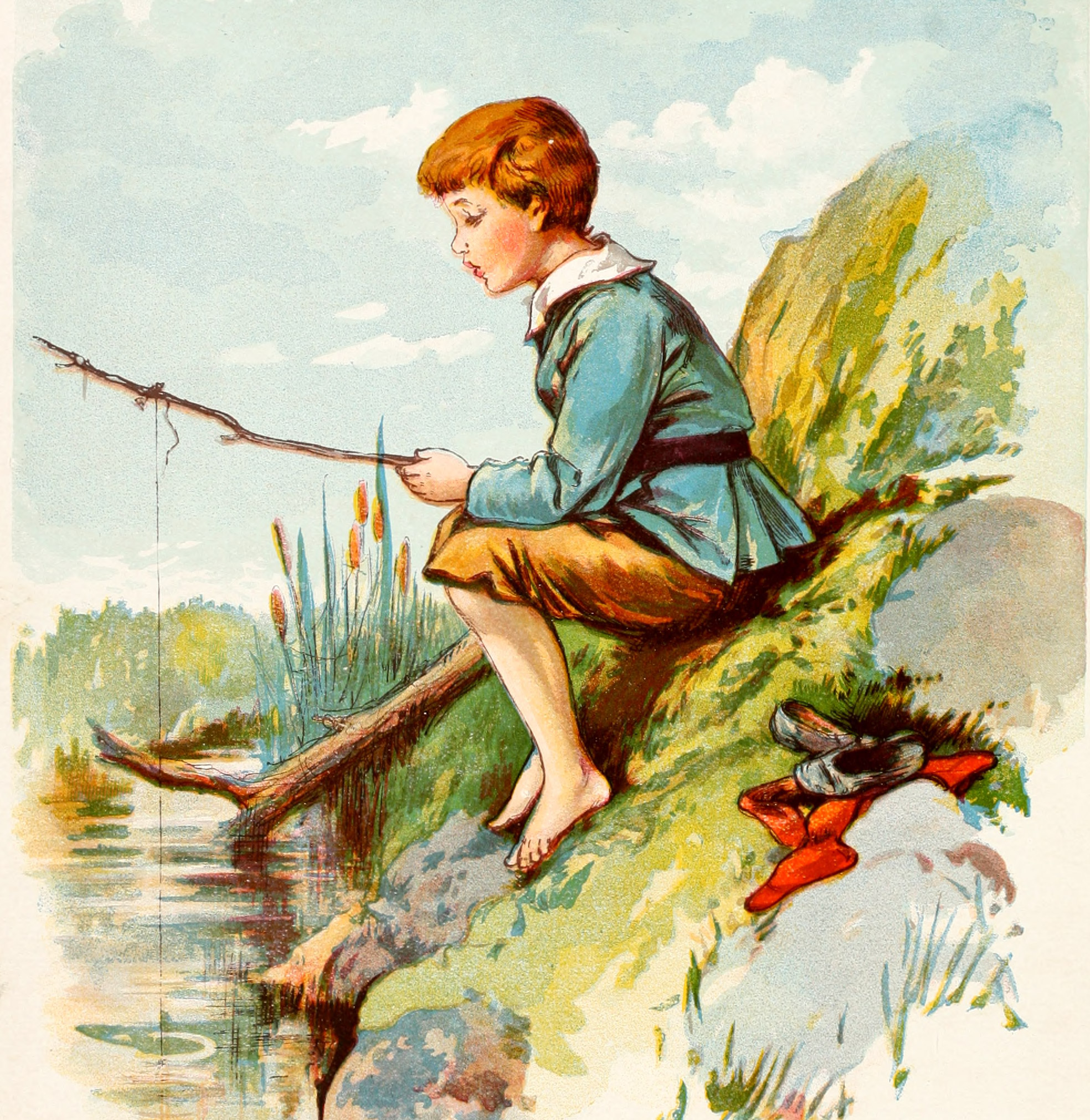

Nursery rhyme
- Published: c. 1765

"One, Two, Three, Four, Five" (also known as "1, 2, 3, 4, 5" or "1, 2, 3, 4, 5, Once I Caught a Fish Alive" in other versions) is a nursery rhyme and counting-out rhyme.

It has a Roud Folk Song Index number of 13530.

== Text and melody ==
A common modern version is:

One, two, three, four, five,
Once I caught a fish alive.
Six, seven, eight, nine, ten,
Then I let it go again.

Why did you let it go?
Because he bit my finger so.
Which finger did it bite?
This little finger on my right.

The melody is The Sultan's Polka, composed around 1860 by Charles Louis Napoléon d'Albert.

== Origin ==
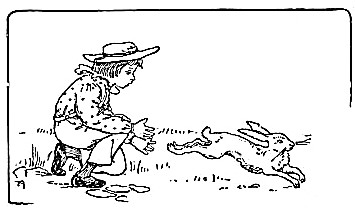
Illustration of the poem from the 1901 Book of Nursery Rhymes

"One, Two, Three, Four, Five" is one of many counting-out rhymes. It was first recorded in Mother Goose's Melody around 1765. Like most versions until the late 19th century, it had only the first stanza and dealt with a hare, not a fish:

One, two, three,
Four and five,
I caught a hare alive;
Six, seven, eight,
Nine and ten,
I let him go again.

The modern version is derived from three variations collected by Henry Bolton in the 1880s from America.

== See also ==
- List of nursery rhymes
