= Tommy Thumb's Song Book =

Book by Nurse Lovechild

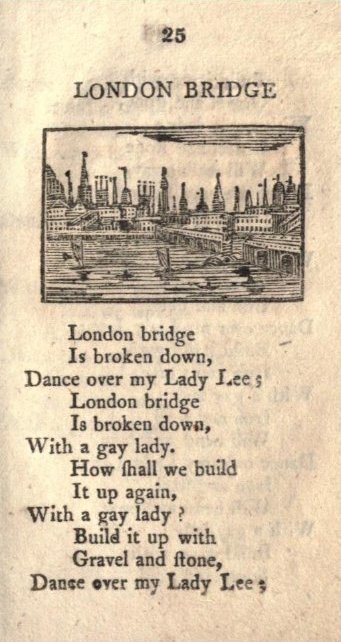
The first page of "London Bridge is Falling Down" from an 1815 edition

Tommy Thumb's Song Book is the earliest known collection of British nursery rhymes, printed in 1744. No original copy has survived, but its content has been recovered from later reprints. It contained many rhymes that are still well known.

== Publication ==
The book was advertised in the London Evening Post for 17–22 March 1744, with the full title: Tommy Thumb's Song Book for all little Masters and Misses; to be sung to them by their Nurses 'till they can sing themselves. By Nurse Lovechild. To which is added, a Letter from a Lady on Nursing; it was published by Mary Cooper of London.

No copy has survived, but a book of exactly the same title was published in 1788 by Isaiah Thomas of Worcester, Massachusetts, who normally reprinted English books in the form he found them. A few weeks after the first publication, Cooper produced another work, Tommy Thumb's Pretty Song Book, of which copies are extant.

== Contents ==
The 1788 edition begins with a letter to Nurse Lovechild, thanking her for bringing up the author's children and for the 'laudable design' of compiling a collection of songs 'fit for the capacities of infants ... by which they are often lull'd to Rest, when cross, and in great pain.' It also asks her not to frighten the children by singing too loud or by telling the names of various Bogies, nor to injure them by swinging them by the arms.

It then moves to a section of illustrations of animals, with the representative sounds they make, with instructions for the reader to show the child the pictures and to make the sounds: 'by which means the child, in a short time, will be able to do the same.'

The final section is a series of nursery rhymes with the titles:

- The Features
- Baby on the Tree Top
- Patty Cake
- Penny a day
- London Bells
- London Bridge
- Tom Thumb and Nurse
- Robin and Bobbin
