= Pat-a-cake, pat-a-cake, baker's man =

English nursery rhyme

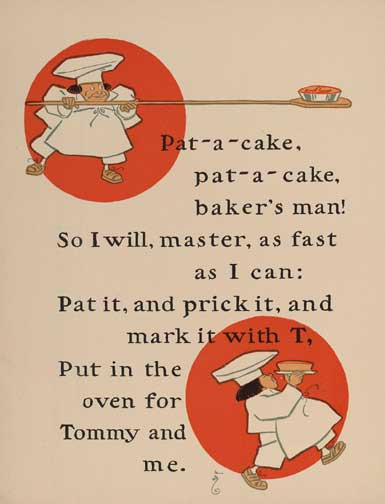
- William Wallace Denslow's illustrations for Pat-a-cake, pat-a-cake, baker's man, from a 1901 edition of Mother Goose

Nursery rhyme
- Published: 1698
- Songwriter: Traditional

"Pat-a-cake, pat-a-cake, baker's man", "Pat-a-Cake", "Patty-cake" or "Pattycake" is an English nursery rhyme. It has a Roud Folk Song Index number of 6486.

== Verse ==
Pat-a-cake, pat-a-cake, baker's man.
Bake me a cake as fast as you can
Pat it, and roll it, and mark it with a B
And put it in the oven for Baby and me.

== Origins ==
The earliest recorded version of the rhyme appears in Thomas D'Urfey's play The Campaigners from 1698, where a nurse says to her charges:

...and pat a cake Bakers man, so I will master as I can, and prick it, and prick it, and prick it, and prick it, and prick it, and throw't into the Oven.

The next appearance is in Mother Goose's Melody (c. 1765) in the form:

Patty Cake, Patty Cake,
Baker's Man;
That I will Master,
As fast as I can;
Pat it and prick it,
And mark it with a T,
And there will be enough for Tommy and me.

Marking pastry or baked goods with an identifiable mark may stem from a time when households without an oven of their own could take their items to a local baker or bake house, paying to have their items finished for a small fee. Marking the pastry would have been a way to ensure the return of the proper item.

The earliest version set to music appears in James Hook's "A Christmas Box" (1796).

== Game ==
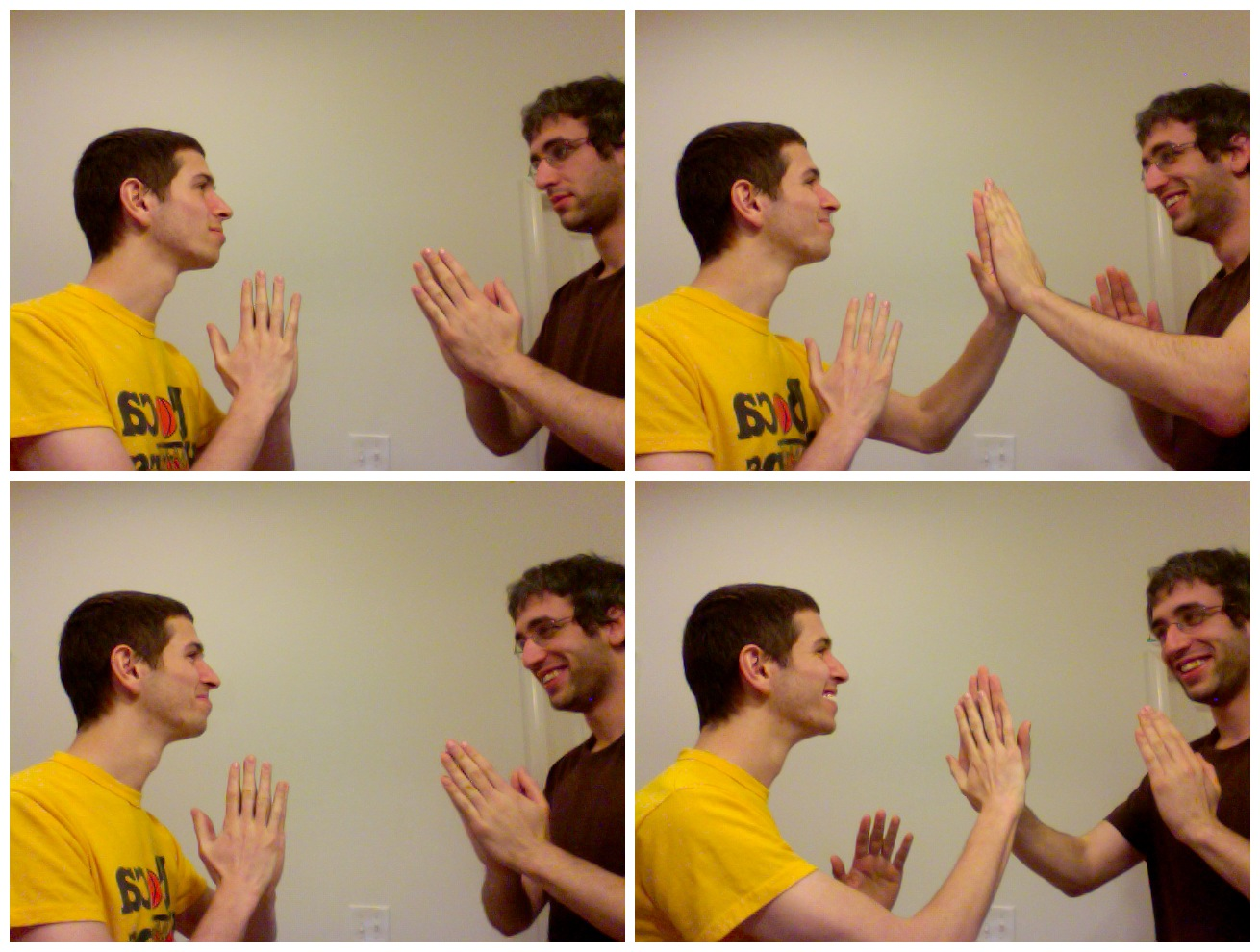
A common style of playing pat-a-cake.

The rhyme often accompanies a clapping game between two people. It alternates between a normal individual clap by one person with two-handed claps with the other person. The hands may be crossed as well. This allows for a possibly complex sequence of clapping that must be coordinated between the two. If told by a parent to a child, the "B" and "baby" in the last two lines are sometimes replaced by the child's first initial and first name.

The "pat-a-cake" song and clapping game was used by Bob Hope and Bing Crosby in their series of "Road to" films. The gag worked by means of adding a synchronised punch into the clapping game routine, allowing them to make their escape.

Patty-cake appears as a plot point in the 1988 film Who Framed Roger Rabbit, where it is made out to be the toon equivalent of sex.

== See also ==
- List of nursery rhymes
