= Sway =

Sway may refer to:

== Places ==
- Sway, Hampshire, a village and civil parish in the New Forest in England
  - Sway railway station, serving the village

== People ==
- Sway (British musician) (1982–2026), British hip hop/grime singer
- Sway (Japanese rapper) (born 1986), Japanese rapper and actor
- Sway Calloway (born 1971), American journalist, rapper, MTV News and radio anchor
- Sway Clarke II, Canadian singer/songwriter
- Espen Lind (born 1971), Norwegian singer who used the stage name Sway
- Jose Penala, Jose "Sway" Penala, appeared on American Idol Season 5
- Susan Wayland (born 1980), German glamour and latex model nicknamed Sway

== Art and entertainment ==
=== Dance ===
- Sway (dance), a motion in ballroom dance
- Sway or schunkeln, a side to side motion in beer and music halls

=== Albums ===
- Sway (Mighty Pope album), 1979
- Sway (Blue October album), 2013
- Sway (Tove Styrke album), 2018
- Sway (Whirr album), 2014

=== Songs ===
- "¿Quién será?", or "Sway", a 1953 composition performed over the years by Dean Martin, Michael Bublé, Diana Krall, and many others
- "Sway" (Bic Runga song), 1997
- "Sway" (Danielle Bradbery song), 2017
- "Sway" (The Kooks song), 2008
- "Sway" (Rolling Stones song), 1971
- "Sway" (Tove Styrke song), 2018
- "Sway", by Blue October from Sway, 2013
- "Sway", by Coal Chamber, 1998
- "Sway", by Fitz and the Tantrums from Let Yourself Free, 2022
- "Sway", by Kacey Musgraves from Deeper Well, 2024
- "Sway....", by Lostprophets from Start Something, 2004
- "Sway", by Paradise Lost from Believe in Nothing, 2001
- "Sway", by the Perishers from Let There Be Morning, 2003
- "Sway", by Spiritualized from Lazer Guided Melodies, 1992
- "Sway", by Vanessa Carlton from Be Not Nobody, 2002
- "Sway with Me", by Bill Haley & His Comets, 1958

=== Publications ===
- Sway (novel), a 2014 young adult novel by Kat Spears
- Sway, a 2008 novel by Zachary Lazar

=== Other art and entertainment ===
- Sex Week at Yale (SWAY), a biennial event from 2002 to 2012
- Sway (comics), a 2006 Marvel character
- Sway (2006 film), a 2006 Japanese movie
- Sway (2024 film), a Canadian film directed by Charlie Hamilton and Zachary Ramelan

== Other uses ==
- Sway (Office app), a web-based presentation application by Microsoft
- Sway, one of the linear degrees of freedom in engineering
- Sway (translational motion), one of the translational degrees of freedom of any stiff body (for example a vehicle), describing motion along the transversal axis (from side to side)
- Postural sway, horizontal shift of person's center of gravity while standing (or attempting to stand) still
- Sway AS, a planned 10 MW wind turbine
- Sway bar, a part of an automobile suspension
- USS Sway (AM-120), an Auk-class minesweeper
- Sway (window manager), a Wayland window manager and compositor

== See also ==
- Swaay, a 2015 EP by DNCE
