= Spinning Wheel (song) =

Single by Blood, Sweat & Tears

Single by Blood, Sweat & Tears

from the album Blood, Sweat & Tears
- B-side: "More and More"
- Released: May 1969
- Recorded: 1968
- Genre: Jazz fusion; pop rock; psychedelic rock
- Length: 4:05 (Stereophonic album version); 3:26 (Original Quadraphonic album version); 2:39 (single edit)
- Label: Columbia
- Songwriter: David Clayton-Thomas
- Producer: James William Guercio

Blood, Sweat & Tears singles chronology
| "You've Made Me So Very Happy" (1969) | "Spinning Wheel" (1969) | "And When I Die" (1969) |

Official audio"Spinning Wheel" on YouTube

"Spinning Wheel"

Single by Peggy Lee

from the album A Natural Woman
- B-side: "Lean on Me"
- Released: March 1969
- Genre: Jazz fusion; pop rock
- Length: 2:35
- Label: Capitol
- Songwriter: David Clayton-Thomas
- Producer: Phil Wright

Peggy Lee singles chronology
| "Big Spender" (1969) | "Spinning Wheel" (1969) | "Is That All There Is?" (1969) |

Official audio"Spinning Wheel" (Remastered 2003) on YouTube

"Spinning Wheel" is a song recorded in 1968 by jazz fusion/rock band Blood, Sweat & Tears; it was written by Canadian lead vocalist David Clayton-Thomas and included on its eponymous album, which was released in 1968.

The song, released as a single in 1969, peaked at number 2 on the Billboard Hot 100 chart in July that year, remaining in the runner-up position for three weeks. "Spinning Wheel" was kept out of the number-1 position by both "The Love Theme from Romeo and Juliet" by Henry Mancini and "In the Year 2525" by Zager and Evans. In August that year, the song topped the Billboard Easy Listening chart for two weeks. It was also a crossover hit, reaching No. 45 on the US R&B chart.

"Spinning Wheel" was nominated for three Grammy Awards at the 1970 ceremony, winning in the category Best Instrumental Arrangement. The arranger for the song was the band's saxophonist, Fred Lipsius. It was nominated for Record of the Year and Song of the Year; the album won the Grammy for Album of the Year.

== Composition ==
Clayton-Thomas was quoted as describing the song as being "written in an age when psychedelic imagery was all over lyrics ...it was my way of saying, 'Don't get too caught up, because everything comes full circle.'"

In Clayton-Thomas's 2010 autobiography Blood, Sweat and Tears, he wrote that the Joni Mitchell song "The Circle Game" inspired some of the lyrics. They lived across the hall from one another in Yorkville, the bohemian rock music epicenter of Toronto similar to Greenwich Village in Manhattan at the same time. He claimed a long-unrequited crush on her. "In later years, our common love for jazz brought us closer together.… I was so completely smitten by her that I borrowed a phrase from her song 'The Circle Game', the line about 'painted ponies', and used it in my song 'Spinning Wheel'. In 2007 both songs were inducted into the Canadian Songwriters Hall of Fame and I confessed my plagiarism to her. She said she had never even noticed".

The album version ends with the 1815 Austrian tune "O Du Lieber Augustin" ("The More We Get Together" or "Did You Ever See a Lassie?") and drummer Bobby Colomby's comment: "That wasn't too good", followed by laughter from the rest of the group. According to producer James William Guercio, this section was inserted at the last minute after the end of the master tape was recorded over accidentally by an engineer at the studio. Most of this section and Lew Soloff's trumpet solo were edited out for the single version; the instrumental break also features an eight-bar piano solo that precedes the trumpet solo on the album version, and that section was overdubbed with guitar on the single version before the last verse. The quadraphonic mix is presented as the song was originally intended, retaining the guitar solo in the instrumental break from the single version, while the finale (which fades out in this version) is presented uncut as originally recorded before the Austrian tune was added and recorded over for the album version. Alan Rubin sat in on trumpet for Chuck Winfield, who was not able to attend the recording session.

== Chart history ==
=== Weekly charts ===
| Chart (1969) | Peak position |
|---|---|
| Australia (Go-Set) | 5 |
| Canada RPM Adult Contemporary | 1 |
| Canada RPM Top Singles (3wks@1) | 1 |
| New Zealand (Listener) | 6 |
| South Africa (Springbok) | 13 |
| U.S. Billboard Hot 100 | 2 |
| U.S. Billboard Adult Contemporary | 1 |
| U.S. Billboard R&B | 45 |
| U.S. Cash Box Top 100 | 3 |

=== Year-end charts ===
| Chart (1969) | Rank |
|---|---|
| Canada | 10 |
| U.S. Billboard Hot 100 | 27 |
| U.S. Cash Box | 40 |

== Cover versions ==
- Peggy Lee's 1969 single release climbed the Easy Listening chart, with a peak of number 24, even before the BST version. She performed the song on The Ed Sullivan Show on April 6, 1969.
- Sammy Davis Jr. included it on his 1970 album Something for Everyone.
- Shirley Bassey included the song on her 1970 album Something.
- Nancy Wilson covered the song in the Hawaii Five-O episode "Trouble in Mind", which originally aired September 23, 1970.
- Austrian singer Marianne Mendt released a version of the tune in 1970 as "A g'scheckert's Hutschpferd".
- Barbara Eden performed a live version on U.S. television in 1970.
- Jazz organist Dr. Lonnie Smith recorded an extended instrumental version for his 1970 album Drives, released through Blue Note Records; this recording was later sampled by hip-hop group A Tribe Called Quest in its song "Can I Kick It?".
- American organist Lenny Dee covered "Spinning Wheel" on his album of the same name in 1970.
- In 1970, P. P. Arnold recorded a version produced by Barry Gibb; it remained unreleased for almost five decades until the long-delayed 2017 issuing of her album The Turning Tide.
- James Brown scored a minor hit in 1971 with an instrumental version of the song, reaching number 90 on the Billboard Hot 100. He also performed it at his shows as early as 1969.
- Canadian a cappella music group Cadence covered this song.
- Maynard Ferguson released a big-band arrangement by Adrian Drover on his 1972 album M.F. Horn Two.
- Benny Goodman's instrumental version was released on a Reader's Digest album in 1973.
- The Milli Vanilli song "All or Nothing", released as a single in 1990, has a similar melody to "Spinning Wheel", and was later the subject of a copyright infringement lawsuit filed by David Clayton-Thomas.
- Mexican rap pop group Caló made an adaptation of this song on their album 1991 "Ponte Atento"
- Jason Forrest released an instrumental remix of the song in 2005, with an accompanying video by Joel Trussell.

== In popular culture ==
- An instrumental rendition of this song was used as a cue on the first Wheel of Fortune pilot titled Shopper's Bazaar.
- In Germany, a part of the song was used as opening tune for the political cabaret TV show Neues aus der Anstalt, aired 2007–13.
- The song is performed by Jeffrey Tambor's character Hank Kingsley in an episode of The Larry Sanders Show ("Larry's Agent"), where he creates a more Latin sound to it, hoping to perform tap-dancing along with the song.
- "Spinning Wheel" appears in the films Indian Summer, Where the Truth Lies, Tinker Tailor Soldier Spy, and Elvis & Nixon.
- In the mid-1980s, a version of the song was used in a British advertisement for Graham & Brown's Superfresco wallpaper.
- In Stage 5 (S6E14) of the HBO series The Sopranos, Paulie Gualtieri mistakenly quotes the song, saying "ride the painted pony, let the spinnin' wheel glide".
- A commercial for Pets.com that aired during Super Bowl XXXIV has the dot-com's sock puppet mascot briefly sing the chorus while riding with a delivery driver.
- The song was performed on a sketch during the 1969-70 premiere season of the children's show Sesame Street by a trio of Anything Muppets, which included the now-retired Muppet Professor Hastings.

== See also ==
- List of number-one adult contemporary singles of 1969 (U.S.)
