= Goldried Quintett =

Austrian folk music band

- Origin: Austria
- Genres: Volksmusik
- Years active: 1980–2012
- Label: MCP / VM
- Members: Roland Mühlburger (accordion); Hermann Steiner (clarinet); Friedl Ganzer (guitar 1983-1992); Peter Gutternig (guitar 1992-2012); Alois Trojer (tuba, baritone - former); Klaus Gstinig (tuba, baritone- latter); Hansl Klaunzer (trumpet - former); Stefan Wartner (trumpet - latter)
- Website: www.goldried-quintett.at

The Goldried Quintett were an Austrian Volksmusik group from Matrei in Osttirol. The group was founded by Roland Mühlburger in 1980, and lasted until December 31, 2012 when the group disbanded. The Goldried quintet has achieved six gold, and two platinum records along with the Oberkrainer Award which was won in 2012.

== Achievements ==
Gold

- Der Paul und sein Gaul (Paul and his horse)
- Wir bleibm Landsleut
- Mei liabes Spatzerl
- Am Sonntag gehn ma Radl fahrn
- Bist mein Schatz
- Komm doch mit um die Welt

Platinum

- Der Paul und sein Gaul (Paul and his horse)
- Wir bleibm Landsleut
