= Swaying =

Swaying may refer to any other regular sideways movement such as:

- Schunkeln
- The movement of trees in the wind
- The kinematic envelope of trains at speed
