= Pop Go the Wiggles! =

2007 studio album/video by the Wiggles

Studio album by the Wiggles
- Released: 2007 (AUS); 11 March 2008 (USA)
- Recorded: 2007
- Studio: Hot Potato Studios
- Genre: Children's music
- Length: 60 minutes
- Labels: ABC (AUS); Koch Records (US)
- Producer: Anthony Field

The Wiggles chronology
Getting Strong! (2007)	Pop Go the Wiggles! (2007)	You Make Me Feel Like Dancing (2008)

Pop Go the Wiggles! is the 27th album release from Australian children's music group the Wiggles. This album won the 2007 Aria Award for Best Children's album.

== Track listing ==
1. Pop Goes the Weasel (Sam)
2. This Old Man
3. Murray Had a Turtle
4. Hickory Dickory Dock
5. English Country Garden
6. Pop Goes the Weasel (Anthony)
7. Here We Go Round the Mulberry Bush
8. Pussycat, Pussycat
9. See-Saw, Margery Daw
10. Teddy Bear, Teddy Bear, Turn Around
11. Pop Goes the Weasel (Jeff)
12. Mary Had a Little Lamb
13. Skip to My Lou
14. Three Little Kittens
15. Two Fine Gentlemen
16. Gregory Griggs
17. Hey Diddle Diddle
18. Pop Goes the Weasel (Murray)
19. Frère Jacques
20. Twinkle, Twinkle Little Star
21. There Was a Princess
22. The Grand Old Duke of York
23. The Farmer in the Dell
24. Ring-a-Ring O'Rosie
25. Oranges and Lemons
26. Miss Polly Had a Dolly
27. Jack and Jill
28. Lavenders Blue
29. Little Bo-Peep
30. London Bridge
31. Little Miss Muffet
32. Chi-Baba, Chi-Baba
33. Did You Ever See a Lassie?
34. Pat-a-Cake
35. Dry Bones
36. Incy Wincy Spider

== Tour ==
The album was promoted on a tour across North America in 2008.

== Video ==
The Wiggles made the "Pop Go the Wiggles!" video in September 2007. DVDtalk rated its content 3/5 stars.

Song and Rhyme List

1. "This Old Man"
2. "Pop Goes the Weasel" (Sam)
3. "Skip to My Lou"
4. "Murray Had a Turtle"
5. "Hickory Dickory Dock"
6. "English Country Garden"
7. "Round the Garden Like a Teddy Bear"
8. "Here We Go 'Round the Mulberry Bush"
9. "Pussycat, Pussycat"
10. "What Do You Suppose?"
11. "See-Saw, Margery Daw"
12. "Teddy Bear, Teddy Bear, Turn Around"
13. "Mary Had a Little Lamb"
14. "Pop Goes the Weasel" (Anthony)
15. "Three Little Kittens"
16. "Two Fine Gentlemen"
17. "Gregory Griggs"
18. "Hey Diddle Diddle"
19. "Frère Jacques"
20. "Twinkle, Twinkle, Little Star"
21. "Pop Goes the Weasel" (Jeff)
22. "There Was a Princess"
23. "Diddle, Diddle, Dumpling, My Son John"
24. "Incy Wincy Spider"
25. "It's Raining, It's Pouring"
26. "Little Miss Muffet"
27. "The Grand Old Duke of York"
28. "The Farmer in the Dell"
29. "Ring-a-Ring O'Rosie"
30. "A Star"
31. "Oranges and Lemons"
32. "Pop Goes the Weasel" (Murray)
33. "Miss Polly Had a Dolly"
34. "Jack and Jill"
35. "Lavenders Blue"
36. "Little Bo-Peep"
37. "Cobbler, Cobbler"
38. "London Bridge Is Falling Down"
39. "Chi-Baba, Chi-Baba" (Note: Not featured on the US release.)
40. "Did You Ever See a Lassie?"
41. "Pat-a-Cake"
42. "Dry Bones"
