= Biper y Sus Amigos =

- Promotional art depicting from left to right: Flopy, Hormiguita Hippie, Patito Juan, Biper and Lucas

Background information
- Origin: Argentina
- Genres: Christian music; Children's music
- Years active: 2002–present
- Label: Heaven Music (2020–present)
- Website: lasaventurasdebiper.com.ar

Biper y Sus Amigos (Spanish for "Beeper and His Friends") is a series of cartoons of Argentine origin, created by pastor David Passuelo with the initiative of helping Sunday schools with children's music.

The best-known songs of Biper y Sus Amigos are "El Patito Juan" (viral on social networks and exceeding one billion views) "Mami", "Abuelos", "Soldaditos", "El Tren de la Salvación", "La Hormiguita Hippie", among others.

== Background and history ==
The pastor and creator of the character of Biper y Sus Amigos, David John Passuelo, he said that the initiative was born with "the idea of helping Sunday schools with music, those people who wanted to sing songs for God at a children's level, not only for the spiritual and moral edification of children, but also to evangelize them".

All the songs and microprograms that are broadcast on numerous radio stations, as well as the video clips and programs that are broadcast on TV, have a biblical basis, carefully supervised by the entire team that makes up the ministry, a team made up of pastors and professionals in different areas.

Beeper and his friends arrived on YouTube on January 5, 2012, and the first video was uploaded on April 9, 2013. Songs like "La Banda del Ganador", "Late Por Vos", "En Un Barquito", "El Arca de Noé", "Somos Soldaditos", "El Tren de la Salvación" and "La Hormiguita Hippie" are the most popular on the channel.

On November 3, 2016, one of their songs "El Patito Juan", went viral on several sites, such as YouTube and TikTok. The song has more than 1,600,000,000 views as of June 2024, not counting views on other channels.

== Characters ==
The character of Biper can be described as a charismatic and well-behaved child, like his inseparable adventure companions, his friend Lucas, his younger sister Flopy, Tori the robot, Juan the Duckling, and the Hippie Ant. As the series has been broadcast, new characters have been added such as little brother Pablito, the dog Boggie Boggie, the Turtle Constanza, Kevin, and Nina, among others.

== Discography ==
- 2001 - Biper Y Sus Amigos
- 2002 - Viajando Por El Tiempo
- 2005 - Agente Biper y los Guardianes del planeta
- 2008 - La Banda De Biper
- 2009 - Biper y Tori El Robot
- 2011 - El Patito Juan: Super Agente
- 2011 - Flopy: Sueño De Princesa
- 2013 - Internet: Biper Y Tori El Robot
- 2015 - La Colección
- 2016 - Historias Para Niños
- 2020 - Lavos Hay Que Lavar
- 2021 - Late Por Vos
- 2022 - Las Vocales
- 2023 - Jonas
- 2023 - A Comer
- 2023 - Amigo De Verdad
- 2023 - Me Gustan Los Instrumentos
- 2024 - Superpoderoso
- 2024 - La Canción Del Movimiento
- 2024 - Disfruta La Mañana Con Biper
- 2024 - Disfruta La Tarde Con Biper
- 2024 - Disfruta La Noche Con Biper
- 2024 - Día Con Biper
- 2024 - Conejito Saltarín
- 2024 - En Un Barquito
- 2024 - Sonrisas
- 2024 - ¡Navidad Con Biper!
- 2025 - Juntos Somos Mejores - Parte 1
- 2025 - Juntos Somos Mejores - Parte 2
- 2025 - Notas Musicales
- 2025 - Hay Un Lugar
- 2025 - Los Animales En El Arca
