= Michael Bredl =

German musician (1915–1999)

- Born: 24 December 1915; Nuremberg, Germany
- Died: 22 June 1999 (aged 83); Bad Hindelang, Germany
- Occupation(s): teacher, musician
- Known for: Interpret and collector of traditional German Volksmusik

Michael Bredl (24 December 1915 – 22 June 1999) was a German Volksmusik musician and collector, publisher, teacher and the first Volksmusik conservator in Bavarian Swabia in the region of Allgäu.

== Life ==
Michael Bredl Michl grew up in the Bavarian Forest, in Lower Bavaria. The family with 13 children sang and played music together a great deal. In 1931 there was the first Lower Bavarian youth singing competition in Landshut and Bredl won the first prize together with two of his brothers. Since this time Kiem Pauli has been promoting the Bredl brothers and a lifelong friendship has developed since then. Michael Bredl was a singer and played virtuoso zither, in addition to violin, wind instruments and piano. He often appeared onstage together with Pauli.

After 1945 Pauli brought Bredl as a teacher to Eggenthal near Kaufbeuren. There he founded the first rural singing and folk music school in Bavarian Swabia. In 1957, at the request of Alfred Weitnauer, who was at that time Swabian Heimatpfleger (conservator of regional traditions), Bredl was employed as a teacher in Bad Hindelang. Once again he immediately formed a group of singers and musicians to play in the regional traditional style.

The Alphorn had not been played in or associated with the Allgäu for generations until in 1958 when Bredl discovered the alphorn on old motifs from the Allgäu. This proved that the Alphorn had existed in the Allgäu region at some point in the past. In 1960 the brothers Albert and Herbert Wechs from Hindelang started to build alphorns again in the Allgäu. Bredl was the first folk musician in the Allgäu to play the alphorn again. Today an Alphorn tradition in the Allgäu has developed from that. Bredl also contributed to the fact that the rare Allgäuer Scherrzither, an ancient local form of the zither that at one point in the early 20th century had only one player left being a cow shepherd in Oberstdorf, became more widely known and played again by publishing several songsheets for it. In 1971 he conducted the first seminars on how to play the Scherrzither and the remaining recorded songs that were historically played on this instrument.

From 1965 to 1967 Bredl was the first full-time folk music custodian in Bavarian Swabia. He was released from teaching. He systematically collected and published Swabian folk music. Thus the Volksmusik archive of Swabia was created in Krumbach. This later became the Folk Music Counselling Office, which led Bredl until 1998.

== Publishing ==
=== Music sheets ===
- Volksmusik aus Schwaben. Aufgezeichnet und gesammelt vom schwäbischen Volksmusikpfleger Michael Bredl. - Musikverlag Josef Preissler, München 1966
- D'r Hiertebue: Volksmusik aus dem schwäbisch-alemannischen Raum. 1967
- Schwäbische Tänze für Blasmusik, zusammengest. von Michael Bredl, München 1967, 10 Stimmhefte
- Schwäbische Tänze für Akkordeon, Zugleich Direktionsstimme zu Heft 2:Schwäbische Tänze für Blasmusik“, zusammengest. von Michael Bredl, München (1967), 30 S., nur Note
- Das Tiroler Raffele und die Allgäuer Scherrzither. Zusammen mit Karl Horak und Volker Laturell. München, 1990

=== Discography ===
- Sechs Schallplatten mit Volksmusik aus verschiedenen bayerischen Regionen, u.a. Schwäbische Volkslieder, herausgegeben von Michael Bredl

== Awards ==
- 1977: Bundesverdienstkreuz am Bande
- 1979: Ehrentaler für hervorragende Verdienste um die Allgäuer Heimat verliehen vom Heimatbund Allgäu
- 1998 Ehrengabe Schwäbische Nachtigall
