= Schunkeln =

A German audience swaying to "Am Dom zo Kölle"

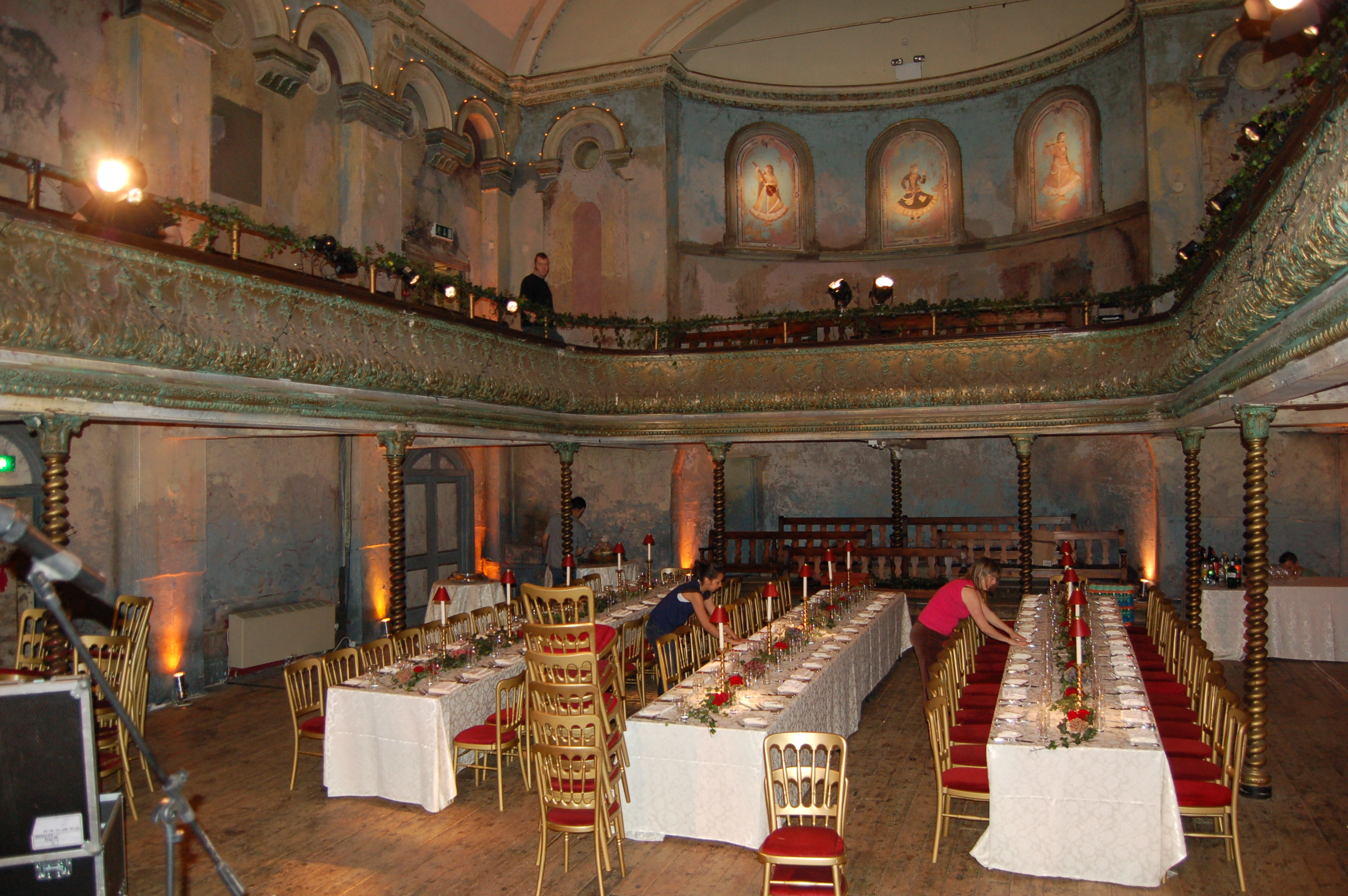
British Music hall where people would listen to performers such as Florrie Forde and start swaying

Schunkeln (German: [ˈʃʊŋkəln], English: /ˈʃʊŋkəln/ SHOONG-kuln) is the name in the German language used to describe a certain rhythmic movement to the beat of a song, people link arms and sway side to side on the spot. This is done either standing or sitting where people move side to side on their seats via the upper body. Sometimes people will also move backwards and forwards, as well as stand up and sit down.

The word is believed to derive from the German word for an outdoor swing, this being in reference to the similar movement of a swing which is Schaukel and Schunkel which is the Upper Saxon German dialect version of the same word.

This form of dance is popular in German speaking countries at Oktoberfest where volksmusik and the popular volkstümliche Musik is often played. It is also performed by audience members on TV shows such as Musikantenstadl.

In English speaking countries such as Britain it is often referred to as simply swaying; the form of dance would often be performed by audience members in British music halls and later working men's clubs when people would sit together and listen to live entertainment with popular music, or in pubs. Sometimes the style of movement was taken part in by audience members of Wheeltappers and Shunters Social Club TV show. Commercial German style beer houses also perform the dance with oom-pah style music.

== Traditional Schunkel (sway) songs ==
=== German ===
- "So ein Tag so wunderschön wie heute"
- "Links, Rechts, Vor, Zurück"
- "Trink trink Brüderlein trink" - (shares a similar tune with the English "Down at the Old Bull and Bush")
- "Auf und nieder immer wieder"
- "Es gibt kein Bier auf Hawaii"
- "In München steht ein Hofbräuhaus: Eins, zwei, g'suffa!"
- "Herzilein"

=== English ===
- "Daisy Bell (Bicycle Built for Two)"
- "Lean forwards, lean backwards, to the left, to the right..."
- "My Bonnie Lies over the Ocean"
- "Bright College Years"
- "Did You Ever See a Lassie?" or "The More We Get Together"
- "Hands, knees and boomps a daisy"
- "Down at the Old Bull and Bush"
- "Oh Oh Antonio"
- "She's a lassie from lancashire"
- "Oom-Pah-Pah" - not traditional, from the musical Oliver!
- "Que Sera, Sera" (Whatever Will Be, Will Be)
