= O du lieber Augustin =

Popular Viennese song

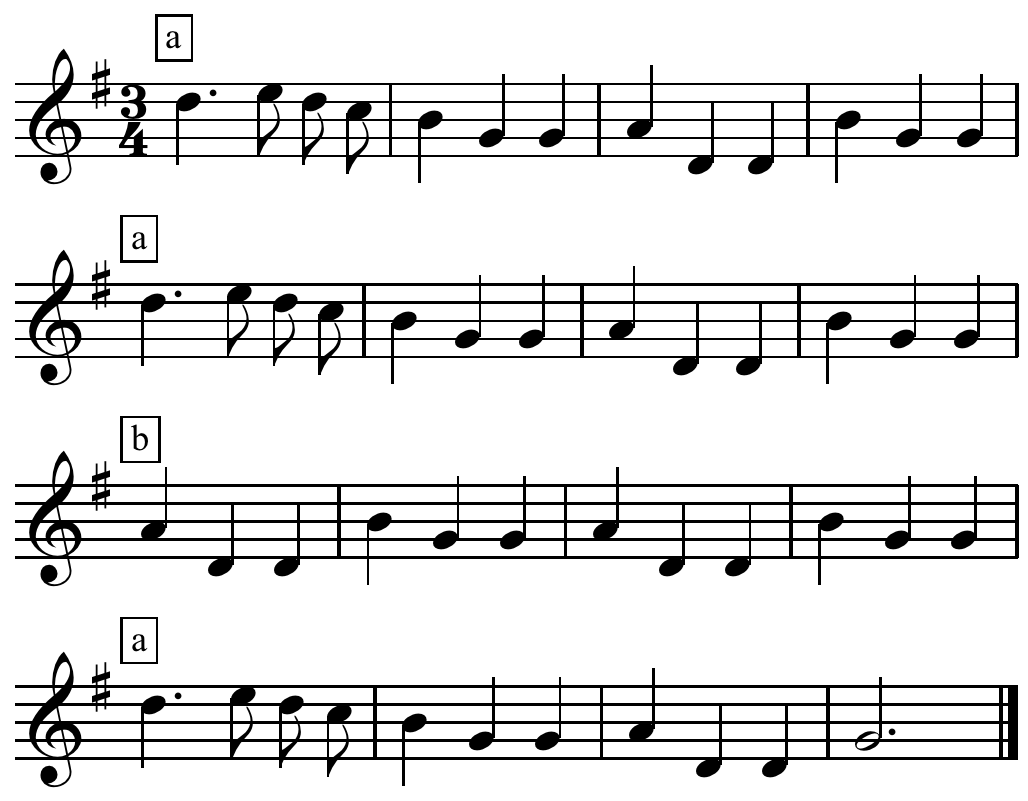
"O du lieber Augustin". MIDI rendition

"O du lieber Augustin" ("Oh, you dear Augustin") is a popular Viennese song, first published about 1800. It is said to refer to the balladeer Marx Augustin and his brush with death in 1679. Augustin himself is sometimes named as the author, but the origin is unclear.

== Background ==
In 1679, Vienna was struck by the Great Plague and Augustin was a ballad singer and bagpiper, who toured the city's inns entertaining people. The Viennese people loved Augustin because of his charming humour in bitter times, and they called him Lieber Augustin (Dear Augustin).

According to legend, once when Augustin was walking home drunk, he fell in the gutter and passed out. He was mistaken for a dead man by the gravediggers patrolling the city for dead bodies. They picked him up and threw him, along with his bagpipes, which they presumed were infected, into a pit filled with bodies of plague victims outside the city walls. The next day when Augustin woke up, he was unable to get out of the deep mass grave. He started to play his bagpipes, wanting to die the same way he lived. Eventually people heard him, and he was rescued. Luckily, he remained healthy despite having slept with the infected dead bodies, and Augustin became a symbol of hope for Viennese people.

The story, already rendered by the preacher Abraham a Sancta Clara (1644–1709), lives on in the song, which is still popular in Austria. The tune is nearly identical to that of "Did You Ever See a Lassie?" and "The More We Get Together", although "O du lieber Augustin" is longer and more melancholic than that song.

== Text ==
O du lieber Augustin
MIDI-based harmonised version for brass instruments

O du lieber Augustin, Augustin, Augustin,
O du lieber Augustin, alles ist hin.

Geld ist weg, Mäd'l ist weg,
Alles hin, Augustin.
O du lieber Augustin,
Alles ist hin.

Rock ist weg, Stock ist weg,
Augustin liegt im Dreck,
O du lieber Augustin,
Alles ist hin.

Und selbst das reiche Wien,
Hin ist's wie Augustin;
Weint mit mir im gleichen Sinn,
Alles ist hin!

Jeder Tag war ein Fest,
Und was jetzt? Pest, die Pest!
Nur ein groß' Leichenfest,
Das ist der Rest.

Augustin, Augustin,
Leg' nur ins Grab dich hin!
O du lieber Augustin,
Alles ist hin!

Oh, you dear Augustin, Augustin, Augustin,
Oh, you dear Augustin, all is lost!

Money's gone, girlfriend's gone,
All is lost, Augustin!
Oh, you dear Augustin,
All is lost!

Coat is gone, staff is gone,
Augustin lies in the dirt.
Oh, you dear Augustin,
All is lost!

Even that rich town Vienna,
Broke is it like Augustin;
Shed tears with me with thoughts akin,
All is lost!

Every day was a feast,
Now we just have the plague!
Just a great corpse's feast,
That is all that's left.

Augustin, Augustin,
Lie down in your grave!
Oh, you dear Augustin,
All is lost!

== Use in other musical works ==
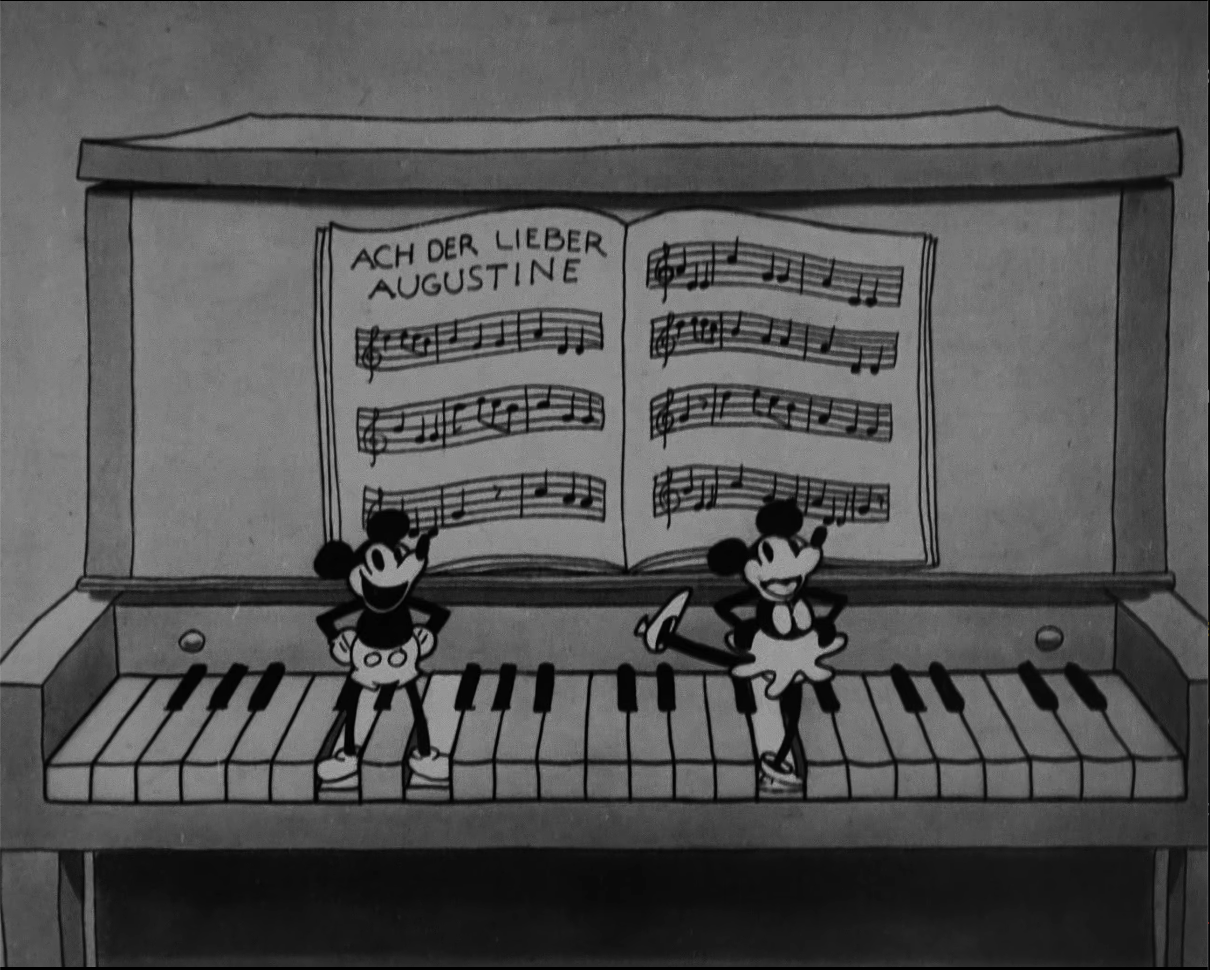
"O du lieber Augustin" as it appears in the Mickey Mouse film When the Cat's Away (named as "Ach der Lieber Augustine")

During the classical era the song was a popular theme for variations. E.g. the composer Paul Wranitzky featured it in orchestral variations, in variations for xylophone, strings, trumpet and drums, and as the trio to the menuetto of his Symphony Op. 33, No 3. Johann Nepomuk Hummel wrote S 47, WoO 2 – Variations for orchestra on "O du lieber Augustin" in C major. The clarinettist and composer Anton Stadler used it in his first Caprice for solo clarinet.

The tune appears quoted (recognisably, but in a dissonant context) in the midst of the second movement of Arnold Schoenberg's second quartet, written a month before the height of Schoenberg's marital crisis. An additional significance attaches to the quotation in view of the quartet being the work in which Schoenberg decisively abandons the traditional key-system and embraces consistent atonality.

A folk song, "Did You Ever See a Lassie?" is set to the same tune. Although it uses the Scottish terms "lassie" and "laddie," the song appears to have originated in the United States.

In Estonia there is a whole family of stereotypical melodies, probably originated from the Estonian bagpipe-tunes of the 17th century at the latest. The kinship of the Estonian bagpipe dance tunes with the Augustin melody is clear, although verification of origin, in one way or another, is impossible due to the lack of written material. The Estonian Augustin-melody family includes, for example; "Puusaluu" (from Kihnu island), "Las aga mede vana Mari tulla" (from Tori), "Nüüd algavad noodilood" (from Muhu island) etc. Nowadays there is also known among Estonians a toast song, that is sung before drinking: "Selle peale vanad eestlased võtsid üks naps" (And upon that, the old Estonians took a schnapps).

The melody is also the base for: "The More We Get Together" a traditional American folk song and popular children's song dating to the 18th or 19th century.

Tom Lehrer quoted the song in his own song "Wernher von Braun" about the German-American rocket scientist of that name.

It was widely used and parodied in cartoons from the early 20th century, and is the melody of the children's folk song, "Hail to the Bus Driver".

The melody is also used in "Fat Turkeys", a children's song sung during the Thanksgiving season in Canada and the United States. Lyrics are:

Oh, gobble, gobble, gobble, fat turkeys, fat turkeys;
Oh, gobble, gobble, gobble, fat turkeys are we.
We walk very proudly and gobble so loudly,
Oh, gobble, gobble, gobble, fat turkeys are we.

Bing Crosby included the song in a medley on his 1961 album 101 Gang Songs.

It appears at the end of the song "Spinning Wheel", written by David Clayton-Thomas and performed by Blood, Sweat & Tears.

The melody is also used in "Daar wordt aan de deur geklopt", a Dutch children's song for the celebration of Saint Nicholas Day.

The Indonesian composer Ananda Sukarlan who is also a prominent figure with Asperger's Syndrome composed his Trio for violin, bassoon and piano based on this tune (both the Austrian and the Scottish) and entitled it "A Curious Coincidence of a Tune Appearance in Austria & Scotland in the Night-Time", as a word game of the novel by Mark Haddon, "A Curious Incident of the Dog in the Night-Time" about a person with Asperger's Syndrome.

A fictional adaptation, "Hail to the Bus Driver," is sung in the episode "The Otto Show" of The Simpsons:

Hail to the bus driver, bus driver, bus driver
Hail to the bus driver, bus driver man
He drinks and he cusses, he stinks up the busses, [2. He steps on the clutch and the toilet goes flush,]
Hail to the bus driver, bus driver man

== See also ==
- Beloved Augustin (1940 film)
