= Children's song =

Genre of music aimed at children

A children's song may be a nursery rhyme set to music, a song that children invent and share among themselves, or a modern creation intended for entertainment, used in the home or education. Although children's songs have been recorded and studied in some cultures more than others, they appear to be universal in human society.

Criteria for a children's song include child-friendly lyrics and a melody appropriate to the lyrics, whose range does not exceed the child's vocal range. Furthermore, the song should be written in a key suitable for the child's voice.

In folklore, the term "children's songs" is sometimes also used to refer to nursery rhymes.

== Categories ==
Iona and Peter Opie, pioneers of the academic study of children's culture, divided children's songs into two classes: those taught to children by adults, which when part of a traditional culture they saw as nursery rhymes, and those that children taught to each other, which formed part of the independent culture of childhood. A further use of the term children's song is for songs written for the entertainment or education of children, usually in the modern era. In practice none of these categories are entirely discrete, since, for example, children often reuse and adapt nursery rhymes, and many songs now considered as traditional were deliberately written by adults for commercial ends.

The Opies further divided nursery rhymes into a number of groups, including

- Amusements (including action songs)
- Counting rhymes
- Lullabies
- Riddles

Playground or children's street rhymes they sub-divided into two major groups: those associated with games and those that were entertainments, with the second category including

- Improper verses
- Jingles
- Joke rhymes
- Nonsense verse
- Macabre rhymes
- Parodies
- Popular songs
- Slogans
- Tongue-twisters

In addition, since the advent of popular music publication in the 19th century, a large number of songs have been produced for and often adopted by children. Many of these imitate the form of nursery rhymes, and a number have come to be accepted as such. They can be seen to have arisen from a number of sources, including:

- Film
- Publishing
- Recording

== Nursery or Mother Goose rhymes ==
The term nursery rhyme is used for "traditional" songs for young children in Britain and many English speaking countries, but this usage dates only from the 19th century, and in North America the older Mother Goose rhyme is still often used. The oldest children's songs of which there are records are lullabies, which can be found in every human culture. The Roman nurses' lullaby, "Lalla, Lalla, Lalla, aut dormi, aut lacte", may be the oldest to survive. Many medieval English verses associated with the birth of Jesus (including "Lullay, my liking, my dere son, my sweting") take the form of lullabies and may be adaptations of contemporary lullabies.

However, most of those used today date from the 17th century onwards. Some rhymes are medieval or 16th-century in origin, including "To market, to market" and "Cock a doodle doo", but most were not written down until the 18th century, when the publishing of children's books began to move towards entertainment. The first English collections were Tommy Thumb's Song Book and a sequel, Tommy Thumb's Pretty Song Book, both thought to have been published before 1744, and at this point such songs were known as "Tommy Thumb's songs". The publication of John Newbery's Mother Goose's Melody; or, Sonnets for the Cradle (c. 1785) is the first record of many classic rhymes still in use today. These rhymes seem to have come from a variety of sources, including traditional riddles, proverbs, ballads, lines of mummers' plays, drinking songs, historical events, and, it has been suggested, ancient pagan rituals. Roughly half of the current body of recognised "traditional" English rhymes were known by the mid-18th century.

A person singing "Twinkle Twinkle Little Star"

In the early 19th century, printed collections of rhymes began to spread to other countries, including Robert Chambers's Popular Rhymes of Scotland (1826) and, in the United States, Mother Goose's Melodies (1833). The origins and authors of rhymes from this period are sometimes known, such as "Twinkle Twinkle Little Star", which combined an eighteenth-century French tune with a poem by the English writer Jane Taylor, and "Mary Had a Little Lamb", written by Sarah Josepha Hale of Boston in 1830. Nursery rhymes were also often collected by early folk-song collectors, including, in Scotland, Sir Walter Scott and, in Germany, Clemens Brentano and Achim von Arnim in Des Knaben Wunderhorn (1806–08). The first, and possibly the most important, academic collections to focus in this area were James Orchard Halliwell's The Nursery Rhymes of England (1842) and Popular Rhymes and Tales (1849). By the time of Sabine Baring-Gould's A Book of Nursery Songs (1895), child folklore had become an academic study, full of comments and footnotes. The early years of the 20th century are notable for the addition of sophisticated illustrations to books of children's songs, including Caldecott's Hey Diddle Diddle Picture Book (1909) and Arthur Rackham's Mother Goose (1913). The definitive study of English rhymes remains the work of Iona and Peter Opie.

== Children's playground and street songs ==
In contrast to nursery rhymes, which are learned in childhood and passed from adults to children only after a gap of 20 to 40 years, children's playground and street songs, like much children's lore, are learned and passed on almost immediately. The Opies noted that this had two important effects: the rapid transmission of new and adjusted versions of songs, which could cover a country like Great Britain in perhaps a month by exclusively oral transmission, and the process of "wear and repair", in which songs were changed, modified and fixed as words and phrases were forgotten, misunderstood or updated.

=== Origins of songs ===
Some rhymes collected in the mid-20th century can be seen to have origins as early in the 18th century. Where sources could be identified, they could often be traced to popular adult songs, including ballads and those in music hall and minstrel shows. They were also studied in 19th-century New York. Children also have a tendency to recycle nursery rhymes, children's commercial songs and adult music in satirical versions. A good example is the theme from the mid-1950s Disney film Davy Crockett, King of the Wild Frontier, "The Ballad of Davy Crockett", with a tune by George Bruns; its opening lines, "Born on a mountain top in Tennessee / The greenest state in the land of the free", were endlessly satirised to make Crockett a spaceman, a parricide and even a Teddy Boy.

=== Action songs ===
Some of the most popular playground songs include actions to be done with the words. Among the most famous of these is "I'm a Little Teapot". A term from the song is now commonly used in cricket to describe a disgruntled bowler's stance when a catch has been dropped. A "teapot" involves a person standing with one hand on their hip in disappointment, a 'double teapot" involves both hands on hips and a disapproving glare.

=== Game songs ===
Many children's playground and street songs are connected to particular games. These include clapping games, like "Miss Susie", played in America; "A sailor went to sea" from Britain; and "Mpeewa", played in parts of Africa. Many traditional Māori children's games, some of them with educational applications—such as hand movement, stick and string games—were accompanied by particular songs. In the Congo, the traditional game "A Wa Nsabwee" is played by two children synchronising hand and other movements while singing. Skipping games like Double Dutch have been seen as important in the formation of hip hop and rap music.

If a playground song does have a character, it is usually a child present at the time of the song's performance or the child singing the song. Awkward relations between young boys and girls is a common motif, as in the American playground song, jump-rope rhyme, or taunt "K-I-S-S-I-N-G", spelt aloud. The song is learned by oral tradition:

[Name] and [Name] sitting in a tree,
K-I-S-S-I-N-G.
First comes love, then comes marriage,
then comes the baby in a baby carriage!

=== Food songs ===
Children's songs are often connected to food, both for educational purposes and entertainment. These songs use rhyme, action, game and satire. From the Opie's research, "Pease Porridge Hot" is an example of an action song incorporating a food theme. In humour, "Beans, Beans, the Musical Fruit" is a playground song about the capacity for beans to contribute to flatulence. The New Zealand song "Fish and Chips" by Claudia Mushin uses rhyme and a chanting rhythm, particularly in the chorus, to celebrate popular contemporary food: "Fish and chips / Fish and chips / Make me want to lick my lips."

=== Pastime songs ===
Other songs have a variety of patterns and contexts. Many of the verses used by children have an element of transgression, and a number have satirical aims. The parody of adult songs with alternative verses, such as the rewriting of "While shepherds watched their flocks by night" to "While shepherds washed their socks at night" and numerous other versions, was a prominent activity in the British playgrounds investigated by the Opies in the 20th century. With the growth of media and advertising in some countries, advertising jingles and parodies of those jingles have become a regular feature of children's songs, including the "McDonald's song" in the United States, which played against adult desire for ordered and healthy eating. Humour is a major factor in children's songs. (The nature of the English language, with its many double meanings for words, may mean that it possesses more punning songs than other cultures, although they are found in other cultures—for example, China). Nonsense verses and songs, like those of Edward Lear and Lewis Carroll, have been a major feature of publications for children, and some of these have been absorbed by children, although many such verses seem to have been invented by children themselves.

=== Parodies and satire ===
Playground songs can be parodies of popular songs such as "On Top of Old Smoky" or "The Battle Hymn of the Republic" in the US with suitably altered lyrics. The new lyrics are frequently highly derisive towards figures of authority such as teachers or involve ribald lyrical variations. Zero-tolerance rules in some schools now prevent this, although they are sometimes ignored by teachers who view the songs as harmless and clever.

Playground songs may also feature contemporary children's characters or child actors such as Popeye, Shirley Temple, Batman or Barney the Dinosaur. Such songs are usually set to common melodies (such as "Jingle Bells, Batman Smells") and often include subversive and crude humor; in Barney's case, schoolyard parodies of his theme song were a driving force behind a massive backlash against Barney in the 1990s.

=== Influence ===
Occasionally, the songs are used as a base for modern pop songs. "Circle Circle Dot Dot", commonly sung in American playgrounds, has been recorded as a rap song. Some broadcasters specifically promote the children's song. Versions with vocals as well as instrumental versions for singing along are offered on the radio and as podcasts.

== Commercial children's music ==
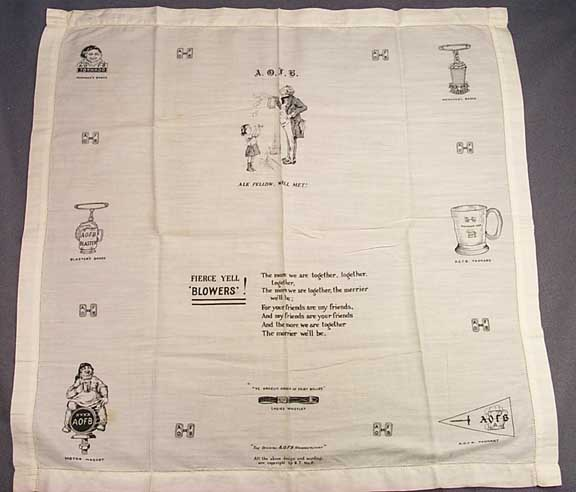
An ancient Order of Froth Blowers handkerchief, a humorous British charitable organisation, with the lyrics "The More We Are Together", a popular British children's song from the 1920s

Commercial children's music grew out of the popular music-publishing industry associated with New York's Tin Pan Alley in the late 19th and early 20th centuries. Early songs included "Ten little fingers and ten little toes" by Ira Shuster and Edward G. Nelson and "School Days" (1907) by Gus Edwards and Will Cobb. Perhaps the best remembered now is "Teddy Bears' Picnic", with lyrics written by Jimmy Kennedy in 1932, although the tune, by the British composer John Walter Bratton, was composed in 1907. As recording technology developed, children's songs were soon being sold on record; in 1888, the first recorded discs (called "plates") offered for sale included Mother Goose nursery rhymes. The earliest record catalogues of several seminal firms in the recording industry—such as Edison, Berliner, and Victor—contained separate children's sections. Until the 1950s, all the major record companies produced albums for children, mostly based on popular cartoons or nursery rhymes and read by major stars of theatre or film. The role of Disney in children's cinema from the 1930s meant that it gained a unique place in the production of children's music, beginning with "Minnies Yoo Hoo" (1930). After the production of its first feature-length animation, Snow White and the Seven Dwarfs (1937), with its highly successful score by Frank Churchill and Larry Morey, the mould was set for a combination of animation, fairy tale and distinctive songs that would carry through to the 1970s with songs from films such as Pinocchio (1940) and Song of the South (1946).

The mid-20th-century baby boomers provided a growing market for children's music. Woody Guthrie, Pete Seeger, and Ella Jenkins were among the politically progressive and socially conscious performers who aimed albums at children. Novelty recordings like "Rudolph the Red-Nosed Reindeer" (a Montgomery Ward jingle that became a book and later a classic children's movie) and the fictional music group Alvin and the Chipmunks were among the most commercially successful music ventures of the time. In the 1960s, as the baby boomers matured and became more politically aware, they embraced both the substance and politics of folk ("the people's") music. Peter, Paul, and Mary, The Limeliters and Tom Paxton were acclaimed folk artists of the period who wrote albums for children. In the 1970s, television programmes like Sesame Street became the dominant force in children's music. In the early 1990s, the songwriter, record producer, and performer Bobby Susser emerged with his award-winning children's songs and series, Bobby Susser Songs for Children, that exemplified the use of songs to educate young children in schools and at home. Disney also re-entered the market for animated musical features with The Little Mermaid (1989), from which the song "Under the Sea" won an Oscar, becoming the first of a string of Oscar–winning Disney songs.

The twenty-first century has seen an increase in the number of independent children's music artists, with acts like Dan Zanes, Cathy Bollinger, and Laurie Berkner getting wide exposure on cable TV channels targeted at children. The band Trout Fishing in America has achieved acclaim by continuing the tradition of merging folk music with family-friendly lyrics,, and rock-oriented acts like They Might Be Giants have released albums marketed directly to children, such as No!, Here Come the ABCs, Here Come the 123s and Here Comes Science.

== Selected discography ==
- Simon Mayor and Hilary James, Lullabies with Mandolins (2004) and Children's Favourites from Acoustics (2005)
- Mike and Peggy Seeger, American Folk Songs for Children (1955)
- Isla St Clair, My Generation (2003)
- Broadside Band, Old English Nursery Rhymes
- Tim Hart and Friends, My Very Favourite Nursery Rhyme Record (1981)
- Bobby Susser, Wiggle Wiggle and Other Exercises (1996)
- Various artists, Hello Children Everywhere, Vols. 1–4 (EMI Records, 1988–1991)

== See also ==
- Children's literature
- List of nursery rhymes
