= Alpine folk music =

Musical genre

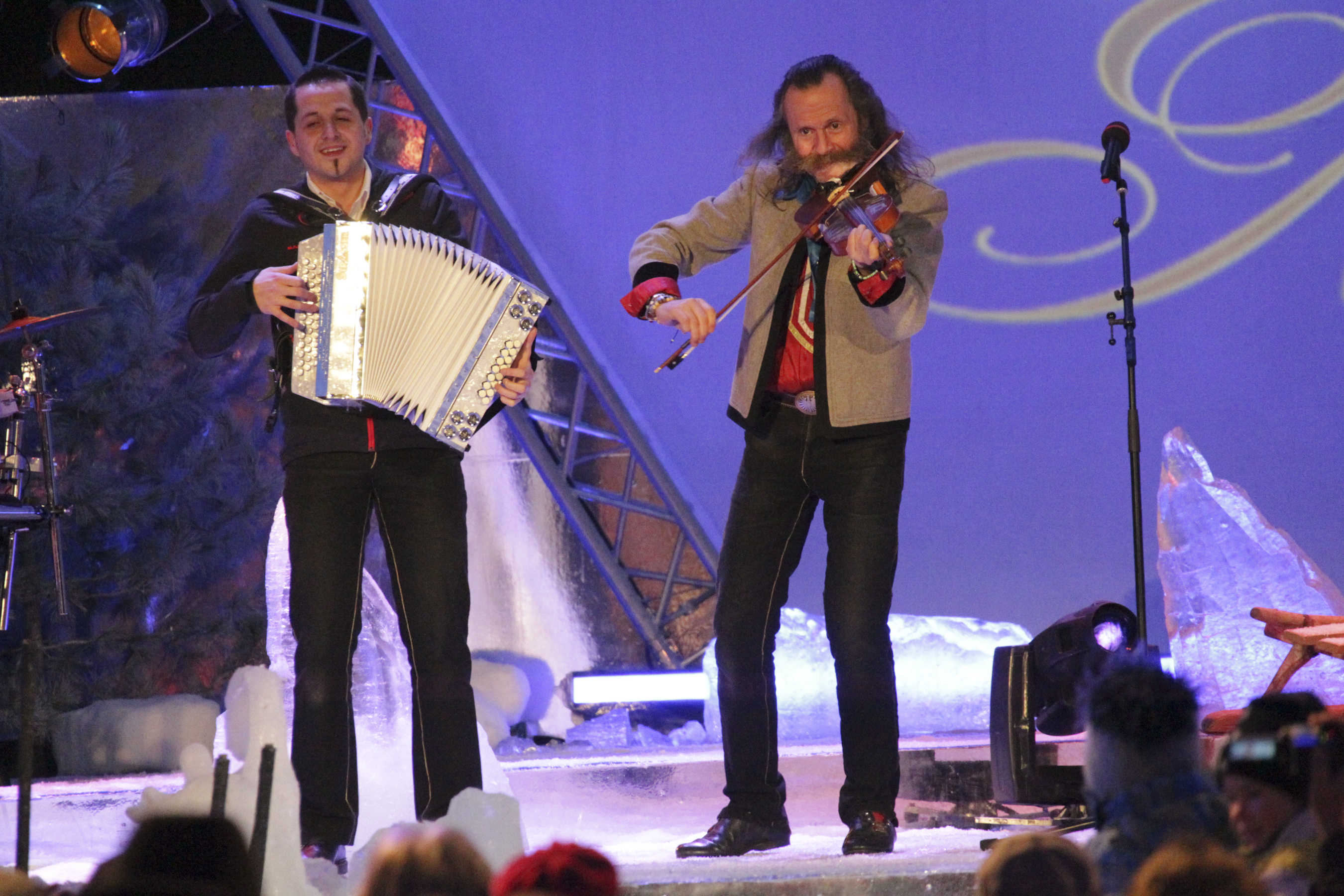
- Two members of the Austrian folk band Die Mayrhofner playing at a concert in 2011
- Native name: Alpenländische Volksmusik
- Stylistic origins: Traditional folk music
- Cultural origins: Alps region
- Typical instruments: Steirische Harmonika; guitar; violin family

Alpine folk music (German: Alpenländische Volksmusik; German's Volksmusik means "people's music" or as a Germanic connotative translation, "folk's music") is the common umbrella designation of a number of related styles of traditional folk music in the Alpine regions of Slovenia, Germany, Austria, Switzerland and South Tyrol (Italy).

It tends to be dialect-heavy and invokes local and regional lifestyles, cultures and traditions, particularly, those of the Alpine farmers and peasants.

Originally transmitted by oral tradition, the oldest historical records like the Appenzell Kuhreihen by Georg Rhau (1488–1548) date back to the 16th century. Alpine folk is characterized by improvisation and variation, uncomplicated major key melodies and simple harmonies. Typical instruments range from alpenhorns to hackbretts, zithers and acoustic guitars, and even violas and harmonicas. Harmonized singing is frequent, but other pieces may require yodeling, while instrumental arrangements are particularly frequent for fast dances or brass pieces.

Alpine folk continues to be performed by many local ensembles and bands throughout the European Alps and should not be confused with Volkstümliche Musik, which is largely to be found in broadcasting media and on ancillary merchandise. Since the 1970s, artists of a Neue Volksmusik genre, such as Werner Pirchner or Biermösl Blosn, attempt to combine traditional styles with jazz, folk, electronic music, rock et al. as a kind of world music. Popular proponents include Hubert von Goisern, Attwenger and Christine Lauterburg.

== See also ==
- Austrian folk dance
- Michael Bredl (1916–1999), a collector of traditional Swabian and Bavarian Volksmusik
- La Lupa, singer and performer from the Alps region
- Music of Germany
- Schunkeln (sway dance)

== Bibliography ==
- Marcello Sorce Keller, Tradizione orale e tradizione corale: ricerca musicologica in Trentino, Bologna, Forni Editore, 1991.
- Marcello Sorce Keller, "Costantino Nigra und die Balladen-Forschung. Betrachtungen über die Beziehung zwischen Nord-Italien, Frankreich und der Suisse Romande". Bulletin. Gesellschaft für die Volksmusik in der Schweiz, X(2011), 33-40.
- Marcello Sorce Keller, "Gebiete, Schichten und Klanglandschaften in den Alpen. Zum Gebrauch einiger historischer Begriffe aus der Musikethnologie", in T. Nussbaumer (ed.), Volksmusik in den Alpen: Interkulturelle Horizonte und Crossovers, Zalzburg, Verlag Mueller-Speiser, 2006.
