= Baisweil =

- Municipality
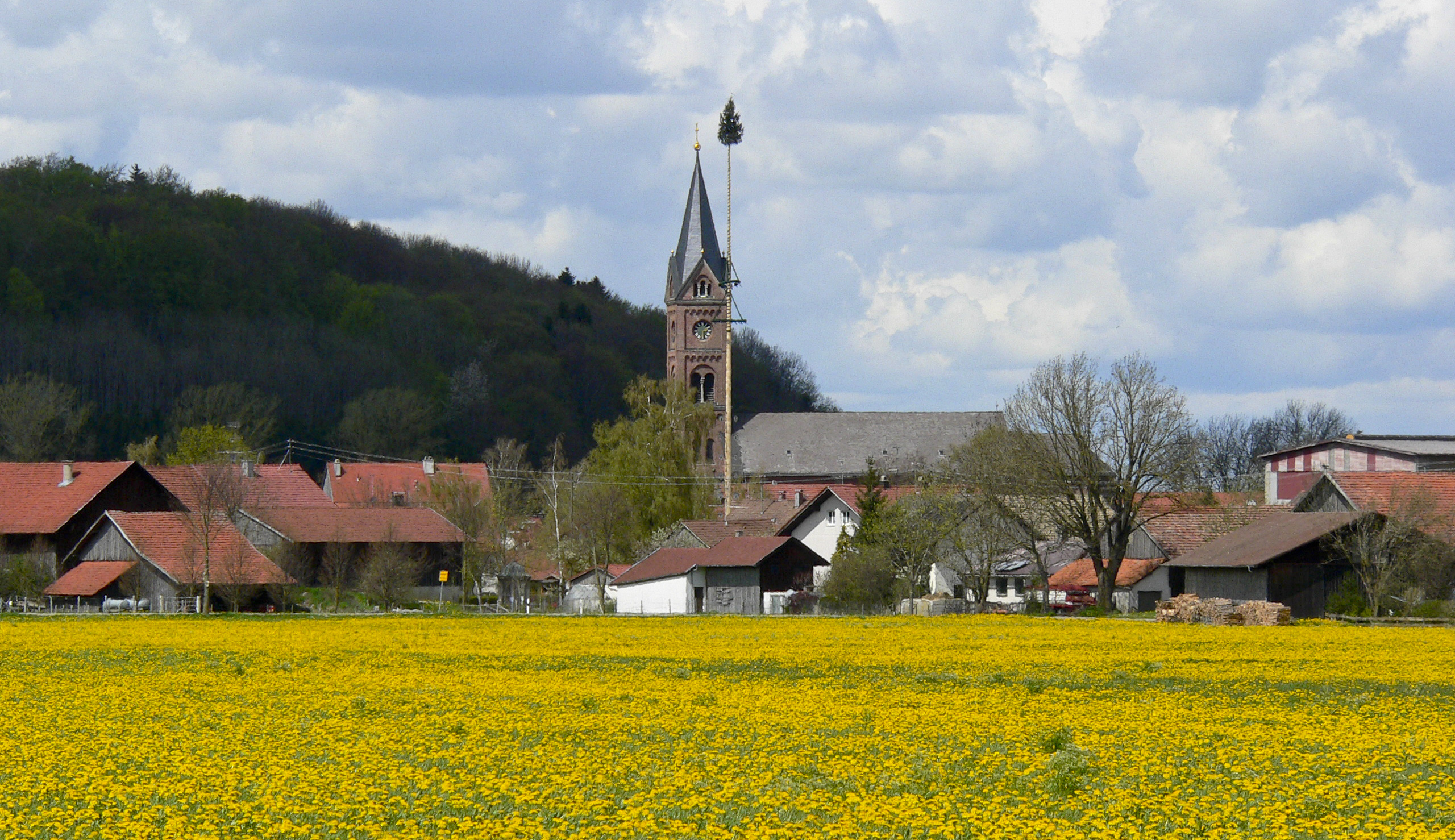
- Church of Saint John the Baptist in Baisweil

- Coat of arms

- Location of Baisweil within Ostallgäu district
- Interactive map of Baisweil
- Location within Germany Location within Bavaria
- Coordinates: 47°57′N 10°33′E
- Country: Germany
- State: Bavaria
- Admin. region: Schwaben
- District: Ostallgäu
- Municipal assoc.: Eggenthal

Government
  - Mayor (2020–26): Stefan Seitz

Area
  - Total: 26.3 km^{2} (10.2 sq mi)
- Elevation: 676 m (2,218 ft)

Population (2025-12-31)
  - Total: 1,357
  - Density: 51.6/km^{2} (134/sq mi)
- Time zone: UTC+01:00 (CET)
  - Summer (DST): UTC+02:00 (CEST)
- Postal codes: 87650
- Dialling codes: 08340
- Vehicle registration: OAL
- Website: www.baisweil.de

Baisweil (German pronunciation: [ˈbaɪsvaɪl]) is a municipality in the district of Ostallgäu in Bavaria in Germany.
