= Eggenthal =

- Municipality
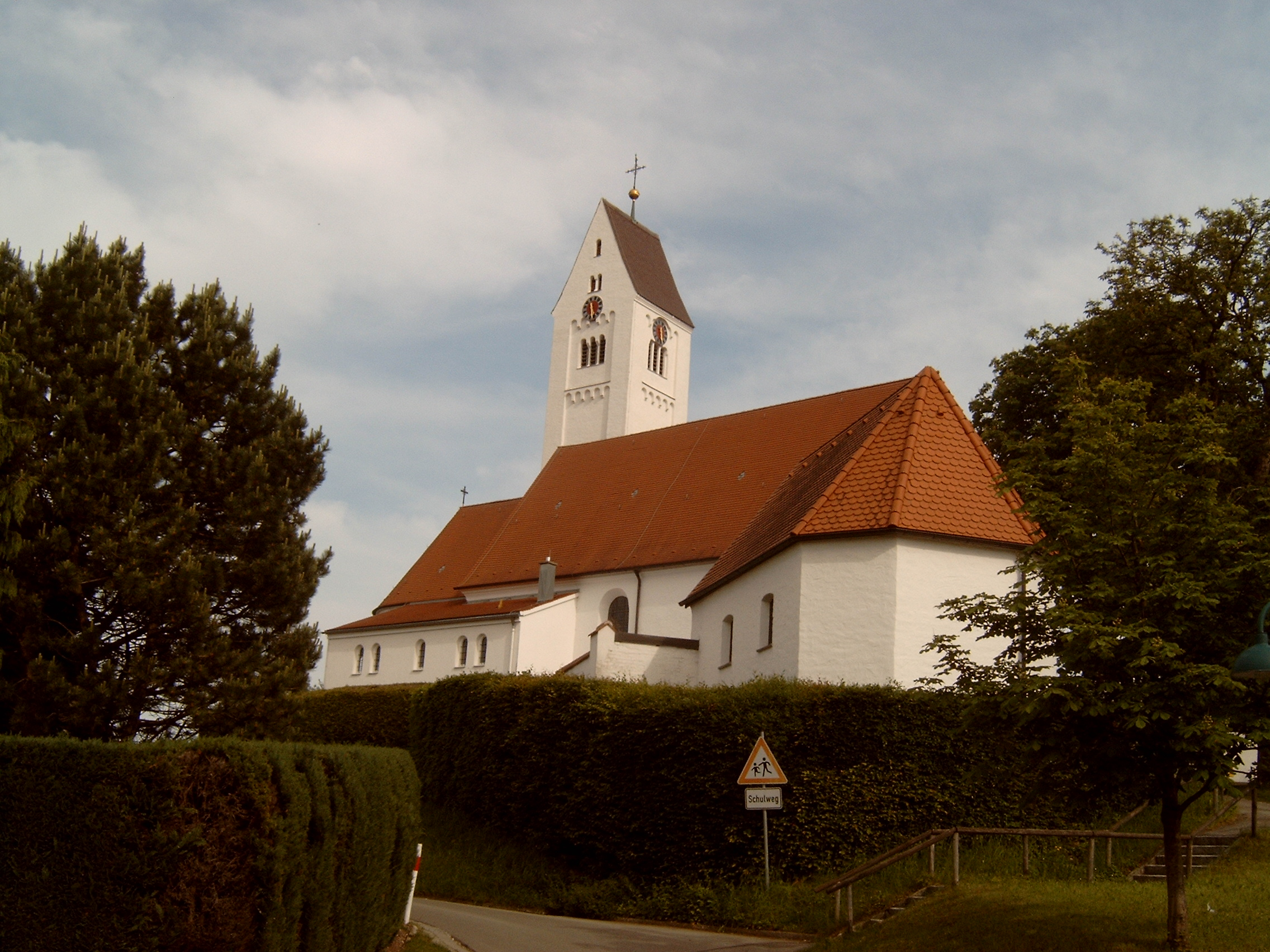
- Eggenthal, church

- Coat of arms

- Location of Eggenthal within Ostallgäu district
- Interactive map of Eggenthal
- Location within Germany Location within Bavaria
- Coordinates: 47°55′N 10°31′E
- Country: Germany
- State: Bavaria
- Admin. region: Schwaben
- District: Ostallgäu
- Municipal assoc.: Eggenthal

Government
  - Mayor (2020–26): Karina Fischer

Area
  - Total: 28.04 km^{2} (10.83 sq mi)
- Elevation: 713 m (2,339 ft)

Population (2025-12-31)
  - Total: 1,402
  - Density: 50.00/km^{2} (129.5/sq mi)
- Time zone: UTC+01:00 (CET)
  - Summer (DST): UTC+02:00 (CEST)
- Postal codes: 87653
- Dialling codes: 08347
- Vehicle registration: OAL
- Website: www.eggenthal.de

Eggenthal (German pronunciation: [ˈɛɡn̩taːl]) is a municipality in the district of Ostallgäu in Bavaria in Germany. It is located in the Allgäu region.

There are the Gemarkungs Bayersried and Eggenthal. There are also the villages of Romatsried and Holzstetten as well as several small hamlets. In Romatsried you will find the Burgstall Romatsried, a place that may have already been populated in the Bronze Age.

== Sights ==
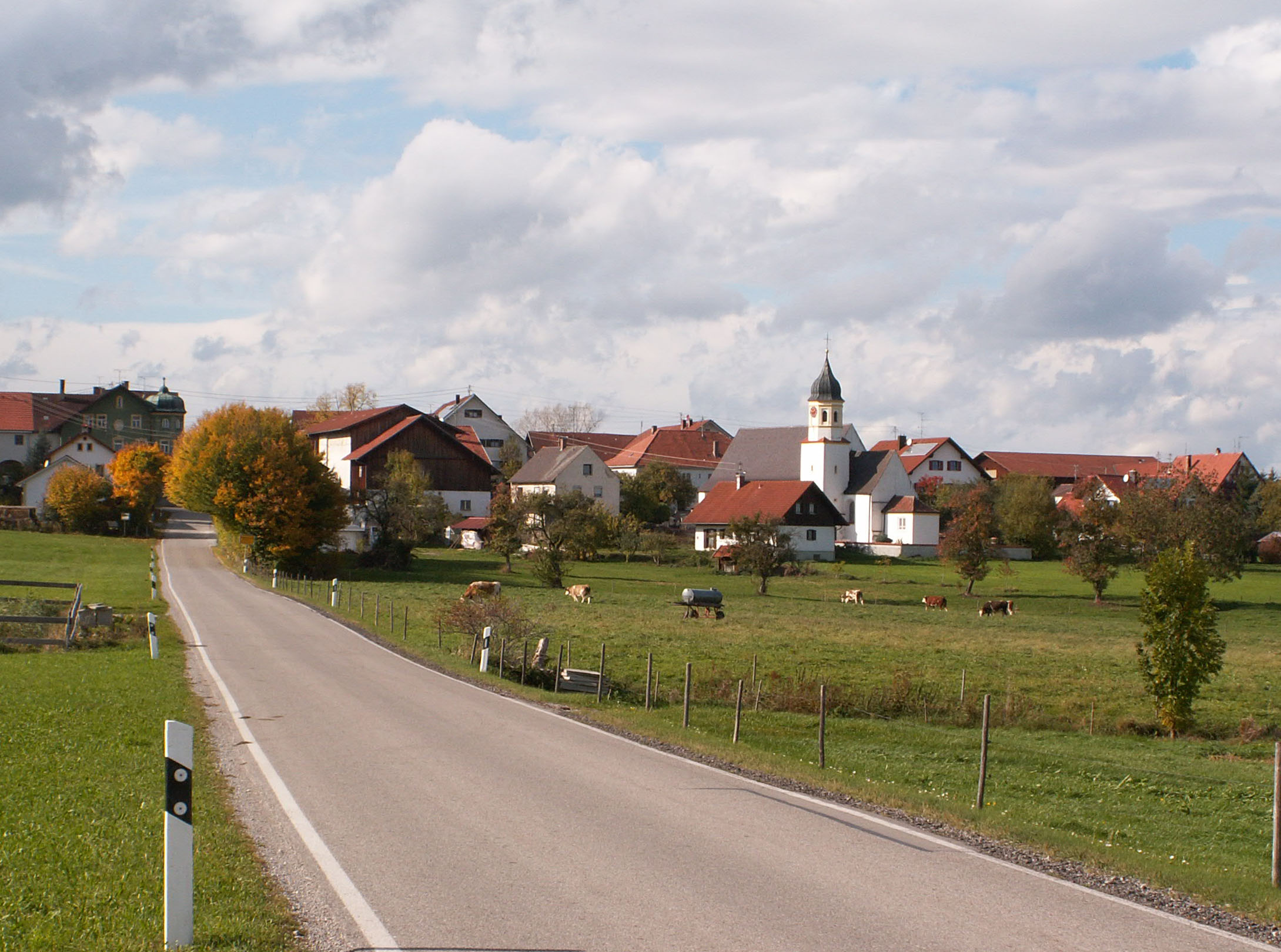
Bayersried from east

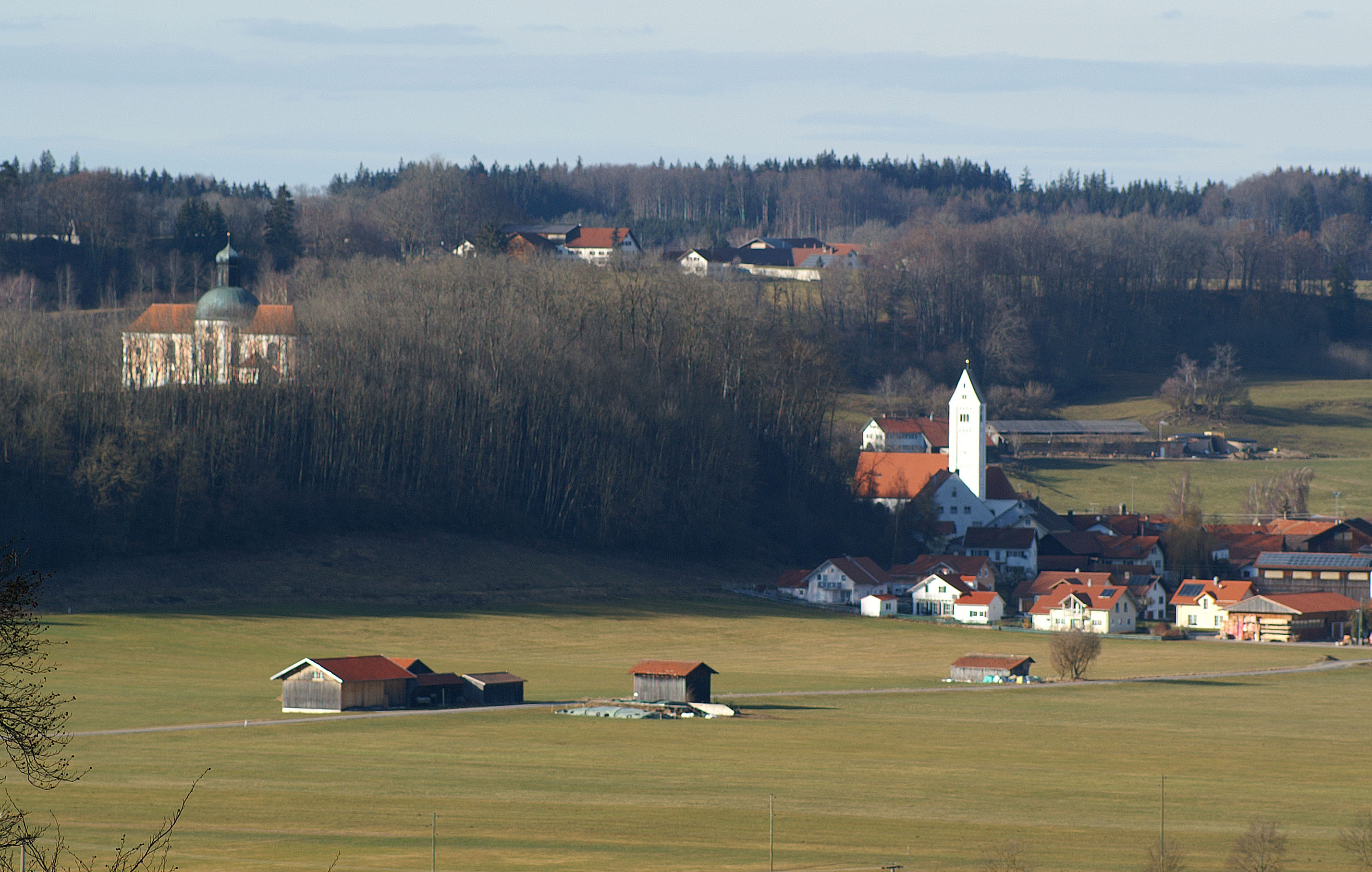
Eggenthal from southeast

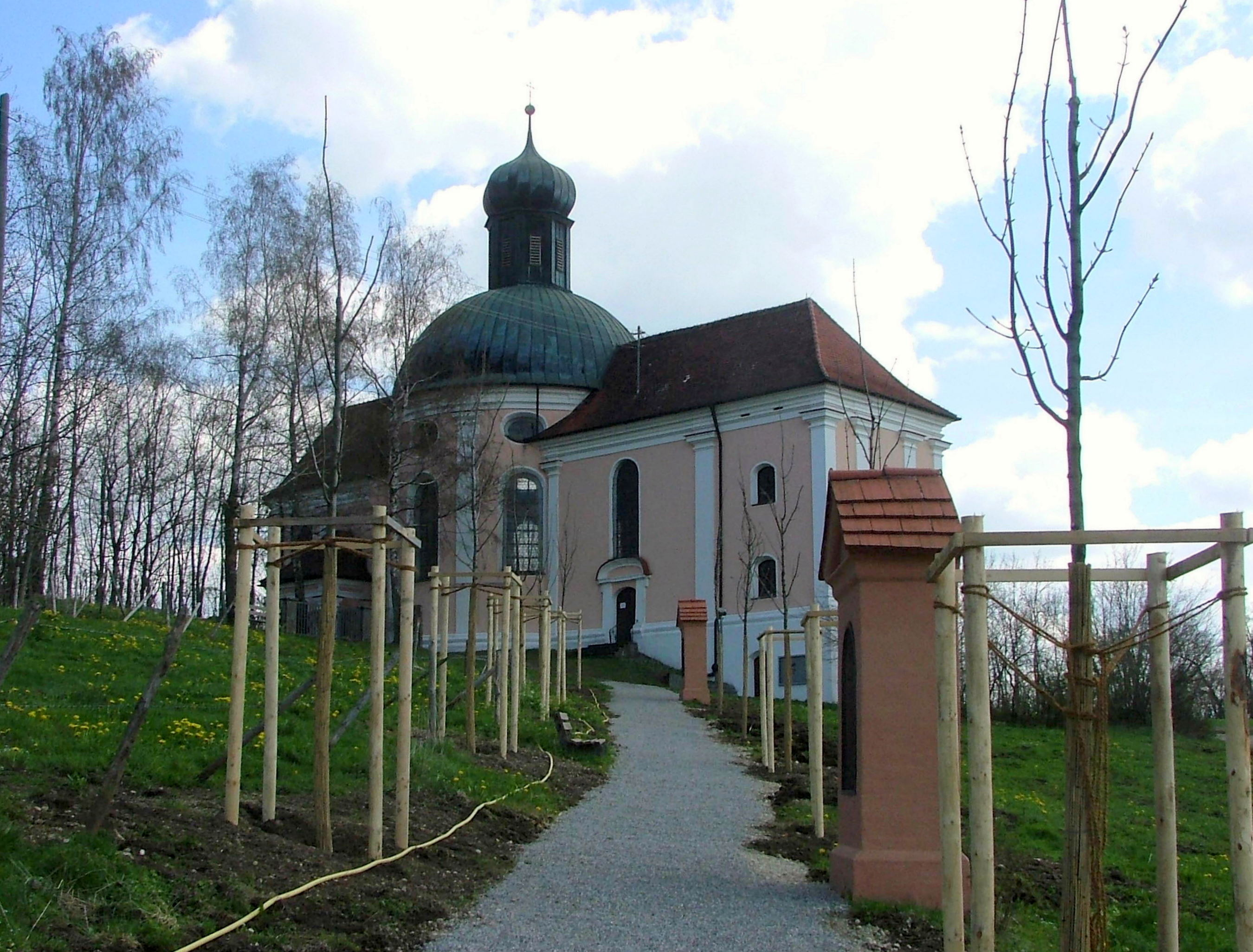
Kreuzweg

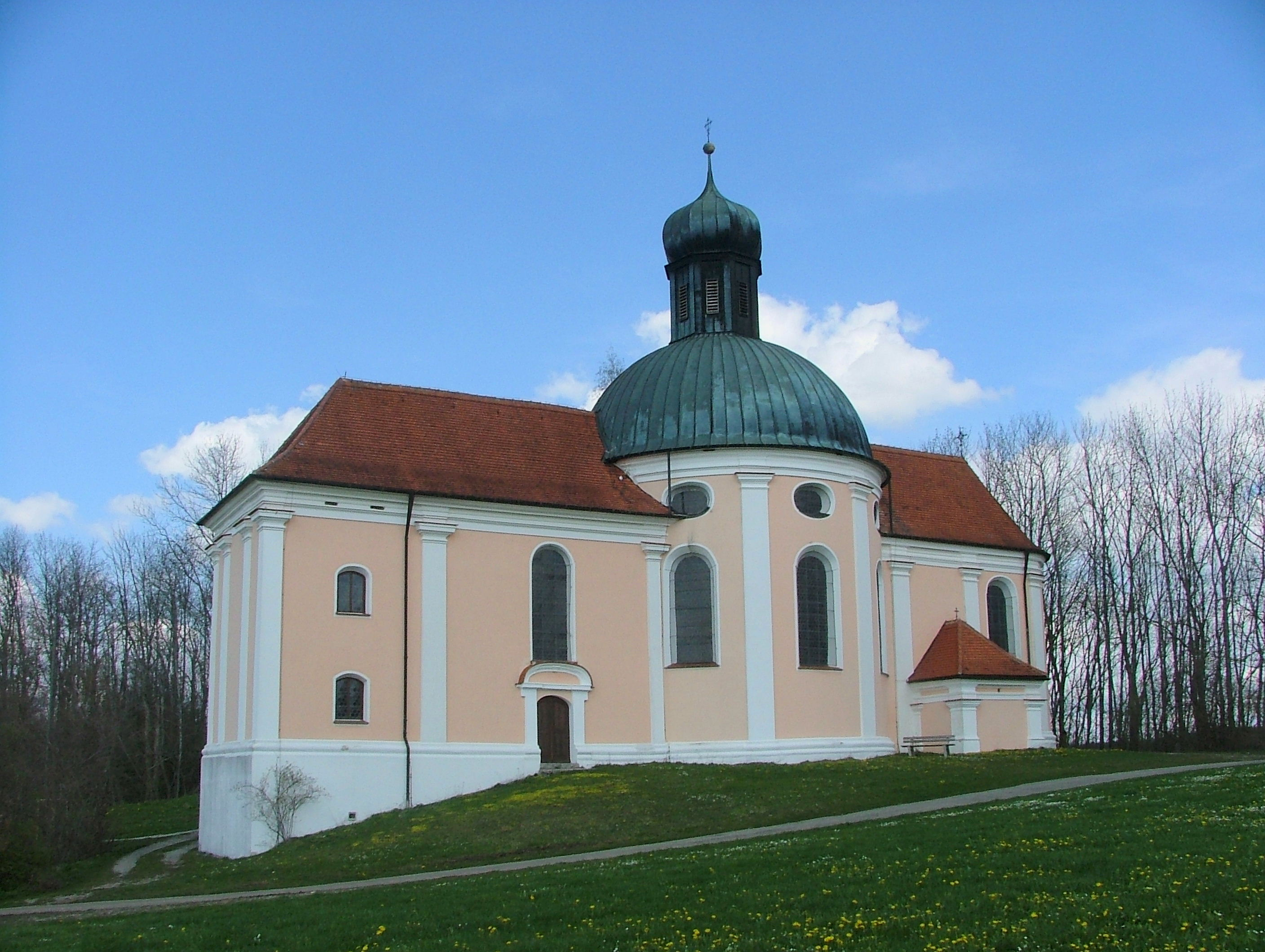
Maria-Seelenkapelle (chapel)

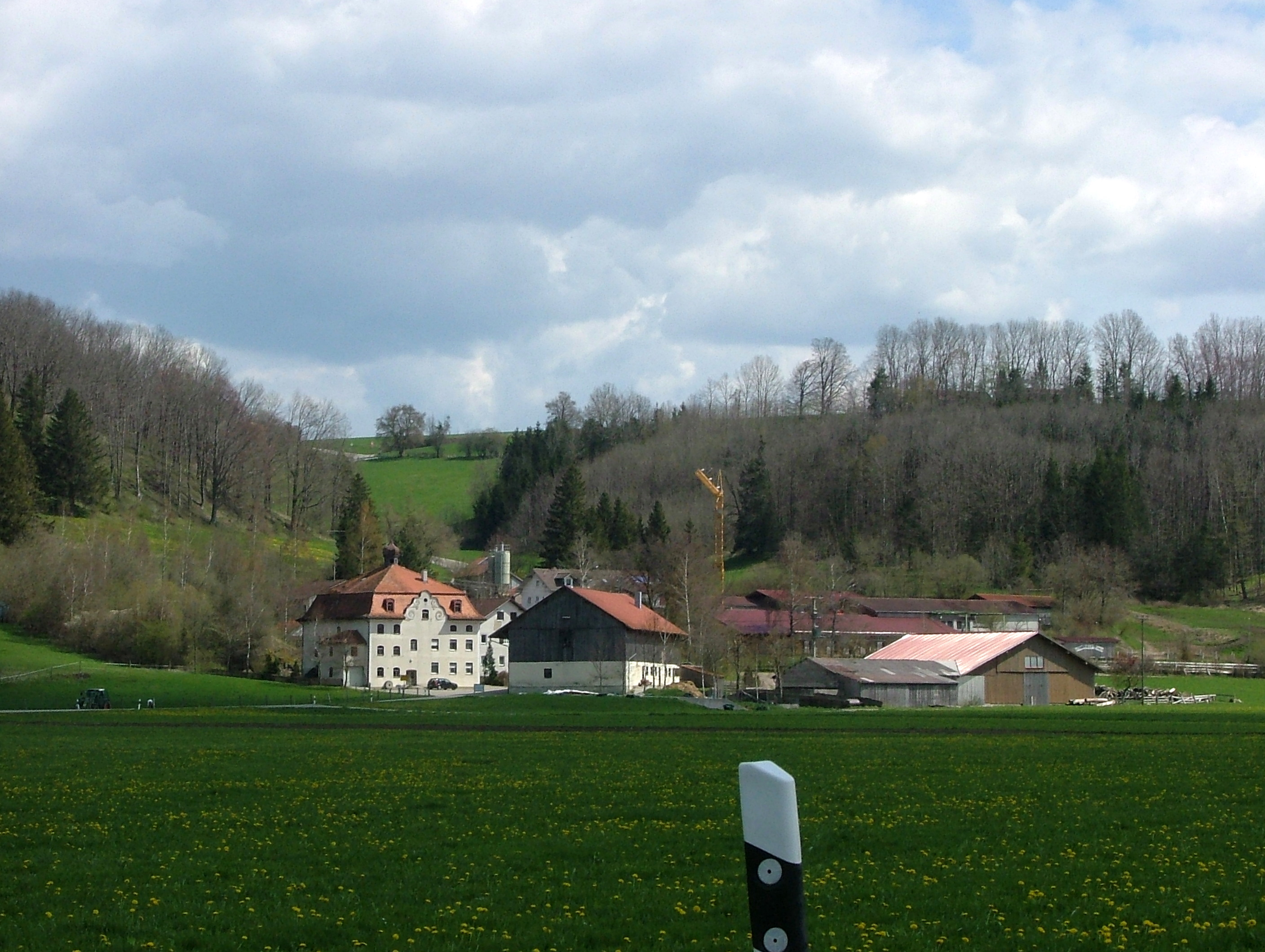
Schleifmühle

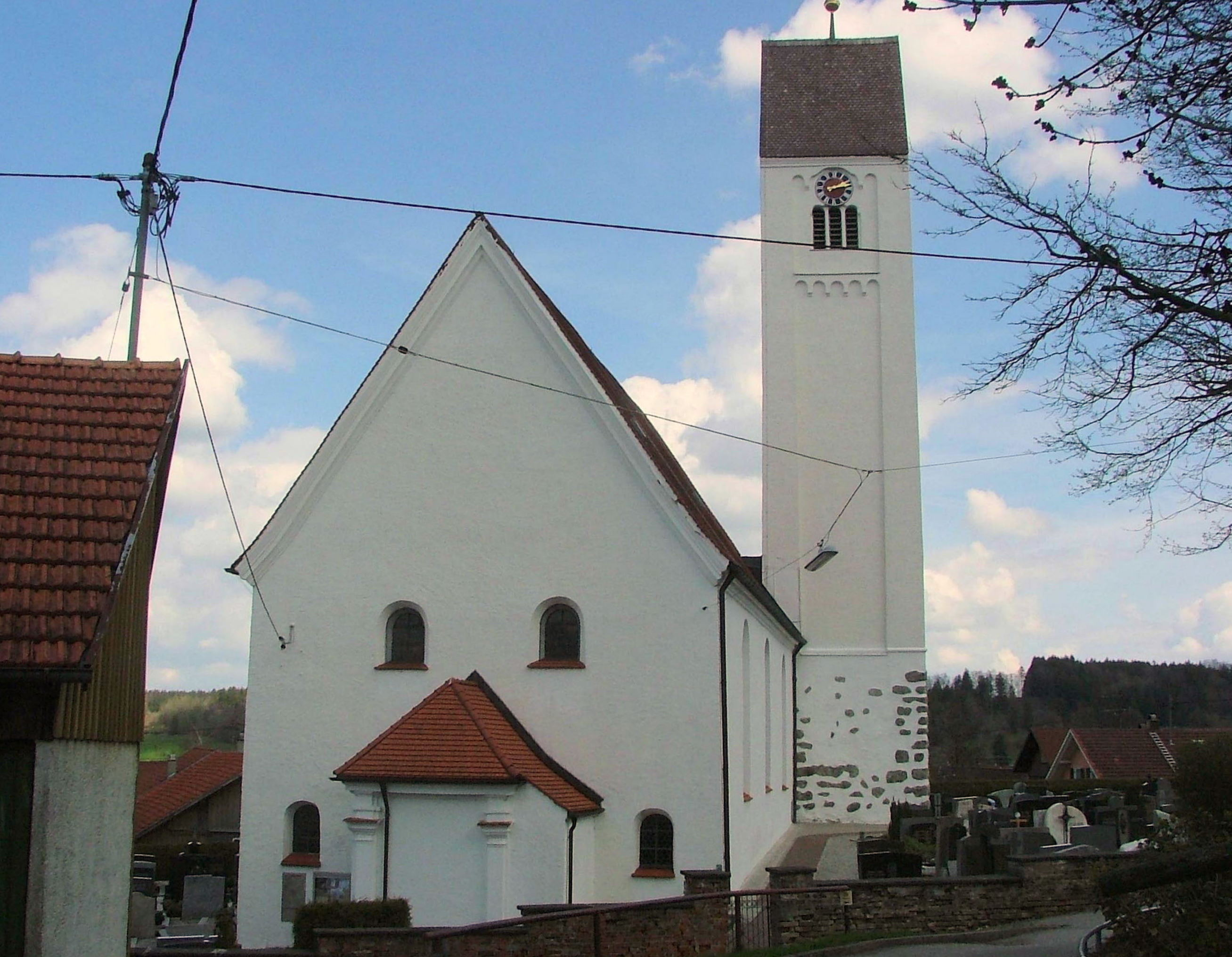
St. Afra

== Notable people ==
- Michael Bredl (1916–1999)
