= Friesenried =

- Municipality
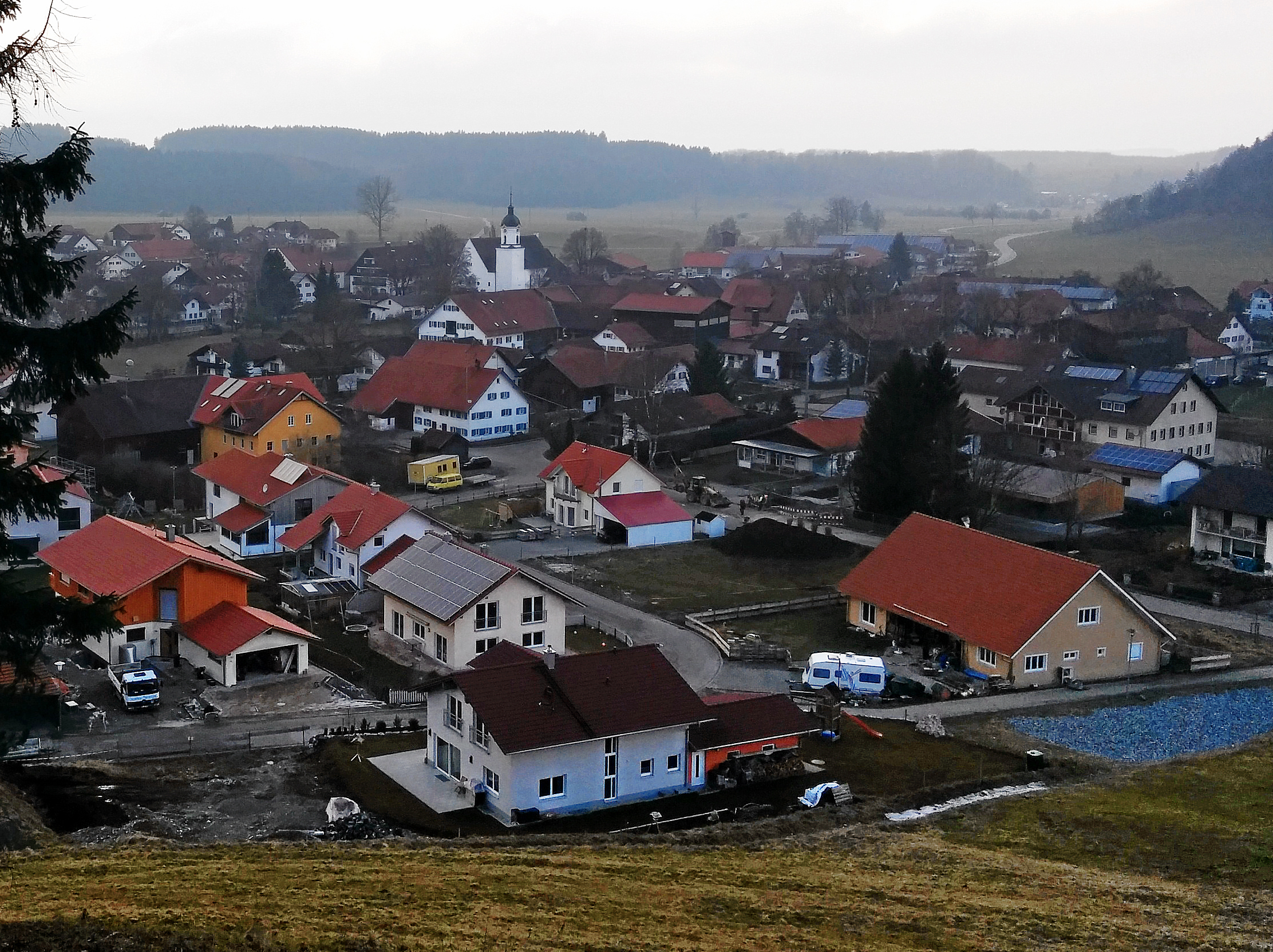
- Friesenried

- Coat of arms

- Location of Friesenried within Ostallgäu district
- Interactive map of Friesenried
- Location within Germany Location within Bavaria
- Coordinates: 47°52′N 10°32′E
- Country: Germany
- State: Bavaria
- Admin. region: Schwaben
- District: Ostallgäu
- Municipal assoc.: Eggenthal

Government
  - Mayor (2020–26): Bernhard Huber

Area
  - Total: 22.26 km^{2} (8.59 sq mi)
- Elevation: 736 m (2,415 ft)

Population (2025-12-31)
  - Total: 1,498
  - Density: 67.30/km^{2} (174.3/sq mi)
- Time zone: UTC+01:00 (CET)
  - Summer (DST): UTC+02:00 (CEST)
- Postal codes: 87654
- Dialling codes: 08347
- Vehicle registration: OAL
- Website: www.friesenried.de

Friesenried (German pronunciation: [ˈfʁiːzn̩ʁiːt]) is a municipality in the district of Ostallgäu in Bavaria in Germany. Friesenried is twinned with the town of North Walsham in Norfolk.
