= Eggenthal (Verwaltungsgemeinschaft) =

- Verwaltungsgemeinschaft
- Location of Eggenthal within Ostallgäu district
- Interactive map of Eggenthal
- Location within Germany Location within Bavaria
- Coordinates: 47°55′N 10°31′E
- Country: Germany
- State: Bavaria
- Admin. region: Swabia
- District: Ostallgäu
- Seat: Eggenthal
- Subdivisions: 3 municipalities

Area
  - Total: 76.59 km^{2} (29.57 sq mi)

Population (2025-12-31)
  - Total: 4,257
  - Density: 55.58/km^{2} (144.0/sq mi)
- Time zone: UTC+01:00 (CET)
  - Summer (DST): UTC+02:00 (CEST)
- Website: www.vgem-eggenthal.de

Eggenthal is a Verwaltungsgemeinschaft (municipal association) in the district Ostallgäu in Bavaria, Germany. Its seat is in Eggenthal.

It consists of the following municipalities:

1. Baisweil
2. Eggenthal
3. Friesenried
