= La Lupa (Swiss singer) =

Swiss singer and performer

La Lupa is a Swiss singer and performer known in the Alps region for her eclectic stage performances while wearing colorful, eccentric costumes.

== Biography ==
She was born Maryli Maura Marconi in the Onsernone valley in the canton of Ticino, on 9 February 1947. She was given the name La Lupa when she was a teenager and kept it as her stage name. When she was 20 years old, she went to Zurich, where she lives.

== Career ==
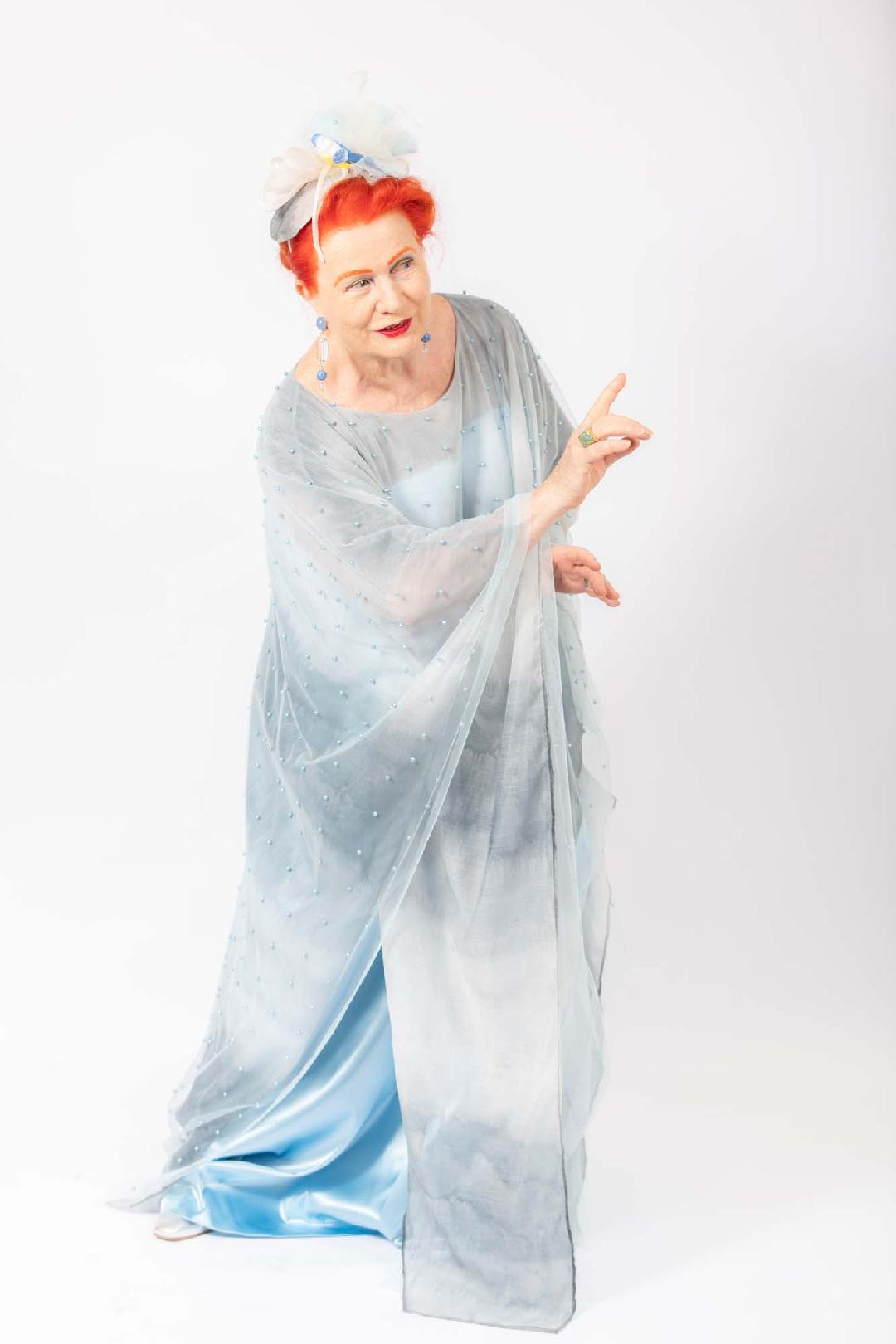
La Lupa, Swiss singer

Her first public performance was in 1980, when she played the leading role in the open-air play "Der Suppastai" with singer-songwriter Walter Liethaof in the Arcas-Platz de Chur, Swiss canton of the Grisons. Since then, she has produced around two dozen solo programs, often presented in Zurich spaces such as the Kunsthaus and the Stock Theater, accompanied by musicians Fortunat Frölich, Fabian Müller and Hieronymus Schädler on the stage, under the direction of Polish musician Michal Ratynski.

Her productions and audio recordings include musical renderings from poets like Dante Alighieri, Kahlil Gibran, Guillaume Apollinaire, Angelo Poliziano, Rabindranath Tagore, Hildegard von Bingen, Pablo Neruda, Federico Garcia Lorca, Francesco Petrarca, Salvatore Quasimodo, Friedrich Schiller, Biagio Marin, and Fernando Pessoa.<

She made a US tour in 1993, during which she performed in New York and Washington, and she also had performances in Stockholm, Paris, Kyiv, Napoli, Venice, Cairo and Amsterdam. In 1992 she performed at the EXPO'92 in Seville. Freshness, fusion of soul and core, ingenuity, and juxtaposed cultural richness are traits mentioned by commentators to describe La Lupa's art. La Lupa's own definition of happiness is: "Happiness is when the struggle for life turns into the dance of life."

== Media ==
A documentary about her life, directed by Lucienne Lanaz, was released in 1999. Interviews with the artist from the Neue Zürcher Zeitung (2018) and the Italian National Radio (2021) are available online.

== Works ==
=== Selected recordings ===
- Con Malizia E Passione (LP, Album); Folk, World, & Country; Zytglogge, ZYT 240, 1982.
- Cammino E Canto (LP); Jazz, Rock, Pop, Contrabass - Fumio Shirato, Saxophone, Flute - Mario Giovanoli, Violin - Urs Walker, Vocals - La Lupa; Zytglogge, ZYT 250, 1984.
- L'Amor Che Si Consuma (LP, CD); Folk, World, & Country; Cello - Fortunat Frölich, Viola Urzli Senn, Clarinet/Accordion - Hans Hassler, Vocals - La Lupa; Zytglogge, ZYT 265, 1988.
- Poesie E Canzoni (CD, Album); Folk, World, & Country, Viola - Urzli Senn, Vocals - La Lupa; Zytglogge, ZYT 4297, 1993.
- La Gira La Röda - Grazie Alla Vita, Folk, World, & Country, Viola-Urzli Senn, Violoncello-Fortunat Frölich, Vocals-La Lupa; (CD, Album), Zytglogge, ZYR 4540, 1995.
- L'Odore Di Libertà (CD, Album), Folk, World, & Country; Cellos - Fabian Müller, Fortunat Frölich, Vocals – La Lupa; Jecklin Red Note, JC 106-2, 1996.
- Amor (CD, Album); Classical, Folk, World, & Country; Saxophone - Harry Kinross White, Cello/arrangements - Fabian Müller, Vocals - La Lupa; MGB, CD 6188, 2002.

=== Publications ===
- Schmid, Silvana (2011). La Lupa die Stimme der Wölfin [The voice of the she-wolf]. Gitty Darugar. Zürich. ISBN 978-3-85791-632-8. OCLC 724772627.
- * "La Lupa – Grazie alla vita". swissfilms.

=== Projects completed ===
- 1981: THE SUPPASTEI, female lead in this folk opera; Chur
- 1981: LA LUPA CON MALIZIA E PASSIONE, with instrumental ensemble. Music: Fortunat Frölich
- 1982: MAGGIO - on Lake Zurich, organized by the Presidential Department of the City of Zurich, staged by Rosina Kuhn, music by Walther Giger
- 1982: LA LUPA CANTA BUSCAGLIONE, with jazz ensemble
- 1982: LA GENTE E LE SUE STORIE, with instrumental ensemble
- 1983: MA LA VITA, with instrumental ensemble
- 1984: CAMMINO E CANTO, with instrumental ensemble
- 1986: L'AMOR CHE SI CONSUMA, with instrumental ensemble
- 1986: LORELAY, LORELAY, LORELAY, musical by Anne Cuneo for the voice of La Lupa
- 1987: PASSEGGIATA TRA GLI ANNI 20 E GLI ANNI 50, with instrumental ensemble
- 1988: NINNA NANNA, lullabies with Nikola Weisse, Urs Senn, viola (reprise 1998)
- 1988: ANNATA LUCULLO - MUSICALE LUPURZIANA (6 seasons - staged meal with Urzli Senn)
- Since 1989: LAMENTI, from the St. Petersturm and Grossmünsterturm, Zurich: She sang these Lamenti (lamentations) from the plague period from Venice for 20 years to remember death during the days before Good Friday.
- 1989: CUORI, PICCHE E FIORI, with U. Senn, F. Frölich, H. Hassler
- 1990: Book “LIEDER DER WOLF / CANTA LA LUPA” by Carlo Bernasconi (Swiss publishing house)
- 1991: AD OCCHI SPERTI SOGNO... with Urzli Senn, Fortunat Frölich, Hans Hassler
- 1992: LE QUATTRO STAGIONI, concert cycle with the Graubünden Chamber Orchestra, soloist
- 1993: LA GIRA LA RÖDA - GRAZIE ALLA VITA, with Urzli Senn, Fortunat Frölich, Franco Mettler
- 1994: CANTO ALLA LUNA, with Irene Schweizer
- 1995: L'ODORE DI LIBERTA, with Fortunat Frölich, Fabian Müller
- 1997: SPECCHIO DELLA MIE BRAME with Fortunat Frölich, Fabian Müller
- 1997: CON TENERA FOLLIA / WITH TENDER MADNESS, poems by Alberto Nessi, with Roger Girod
- 1999: VOLO E MI RICORDO - solo
- 2001: AMOR CHE NELLA MENTE MI RAGIONA, with Fabian Müller, cello, Harry Kinross White, saxophone, directed by Michael Ratynski
- 2003: EFFIMERO IL TEMPO, with Harry White, arrangements / compositions Walther Giger, directed by Michael Ratynski
- 2004: DUM VACAT/AS LONG TIME REMAINS, poems by Fabio Pusterla, with Roger Girod
- 2004: HAPPY DAYS, by Samuel Beckett, directed by Thomas Hostettler
- 2006: ORPHEUS IN THE UNDERWORLD, monologue by Gabrielle Alioth. Producer: Margrit Raguth
- 2006 CHE FORTUNA ESSERE FELICI, with Harry White saxophone, compositions/arrangements: Walther Giger, directed by Michael Ratynski
- 2008:
  - SUONATE CAMPANE with Walther Giger, guitar and arrangements, directed by Michael Ratynski
  - Performances of ORPHEUS IN THE UNDERWORLD in the gypsum mine in Schleitheim
- 2009:
  - THE CHILD, monologue by Margrith Raguth, directed by Michael Ratynski
  - Photo project: La Lupa da Biondi - idea: La Lupa, photos Barbara Graf Horka
- 2010: MATER, guitar/arrangements Walther Giger, directed by Michael Ratynski
- 2013: COLORI - i canti del mondo, with Hieronymus Schädler, flute, directed by Michael Ratynski
- 2015: ARS AMANDI - The Art of Loving, by Ovid, with Hieronymus Schädler, flute, directed by Erica Hänssler
- 2017: MONDO MIO! - The world is mine! With Hieronymus Schädler, flute, directed by Michael Ratynski
- 2019: VOLO E MI RICORDO - Solo, directed by Eric Rohner
- 2023: SOGNI D'ACQUA - Solo
