= To market, to market =

Nursery rhyme

"To Market, To Market"

Nursery rhyme
- Published: 1611

"To Market, To Market" or "To Market, To Market, to Buy a Fat Pig" is a folk nursery rhyme which is based upon the traditional rural activity of going to a market or fair where agricultural produce would be bought and sold. It has a Roud Folk Song Index number of 19708.

== Lyrics ==
The first complete recorded version of the rhyme appeared in 1805 in Songs for the Nursery as "To market, to market, to buy a penny bun," with no reference to a pig.

A common variation in the present day is:

To market, to market, to buy a fat pig,
Home again, home again, jiggety-jig.

To market, to market, to buy a fat hog,
Home again, home again, jiggety-jog.
To market, to market to buy a plum cake,
Home again, home again, market is late.

To market, to market, to buy a plum bun,
Home again, home again, market is done.
To market, to market to buy a fat dog,
Home again, home again, jiggety jog.
To market, to market to buy a small chick,
Home again, home again, jiggety jig.

There have been many variations such as this reworking:

To market, to market, to buy a fat pig!
Home with it! Home with it! Jiggety jig!

Stuff it till Christmas and make a fat hog,
Then at Smithfield Show win a prize, jiggety jog!

== Origins ==
The rhyme is first recorded in part in John Florio's, A Worlde of Wordes, or Most Copious, and exact Dictionarie in Italian and English, published in 1598, which defines "Abomba" as "a man's home or resting place: home againe, home againe." The 1611 edition is even clearer, referring to "the place where children playing hide themselves ... Also as we used to say Home againe home againe, market is done." We do not have records again until the following version was printed in Songs for the Nursery (1805):

"To market, to market, to buy a penny bun,
Home again, home again, market is done."
