= Sway (novel) =

2014 young adult novel by Kat Spears

Swayomama
- First edition
- Author: Kat Spears
- Language: English
- Genre: Young adult fiction
- Published: 2014, St. Martin's Griffin
- Publication place: United States
- Media type: Print, e-book, audiobook
- Pages: 320 pages
- ISBN: 1250051436

Sway is a 2014 young adult novel by American author Kat Spears and her debut novel. The work was first published on 16 September 2014 through St. Martin's Griffin and is a modern take on the story of Cyrano de Bergerac.

== Synopsis ==
Jesse "Sway" Alderman is a person who can get you whatever you want, like a date with that one person that seems to be completely unattainable. As a result, Jesse has developed a reputation for being calm, collected, and never letting anything deter him from successfully completing his transactions. This resolve is tested when Ken, the school's football captain, asks Jessie to help him win over Bridget, a good girl that has already rebuffed his advances. No one is more surprised than Jesse when he finds himself developing feelings for Bridget and he's even more shocked when he finds himself bonding with Bridget's brother Pete, as Jesse goes out of his way to avoid making any real friendships. Pete has cerebral palsy and as a result, has a limp, an asymmetrical face, a huge problem with low self-esteem, and a massive chip on his shoulder regarding what he sees as people (including his own sister) being nice to him only out of pity and his parents constantly comparing him to Bridget, who they view as practically perfect.

Pete immediately latches on to Jesse, who initially gives a lackadaisical response to Pete's attempts to hang out with him but finds himself somewhat enjoying their encounters even as Jesse manages to successfully unite Ken and Bridget. The only thing that bothers him is Pete's pessimistic attitude about himself and his negative behavior towards Bridget, which culminates in the two boys fighting. They make up soon after and Jesse even attends Pete's birthday party, only for Ken (who was also invited) to corner Jesse and begin berating him for attending and accuse Jesse of only befriending Pete in order to get Bridget to fall for him (Jesse). Irritated and knowing that Ken would not believe that he truly liked being around Pete and that the friendship was not intentional, Jesse sarcastically says that he only befriended the boy in order to hook Ken and Bridget up and that he found him to be unlikable- only for Pete to overhear the entire conversation. The following day Pete calls Jesse in an attempt to hear the whole story, but Jesse lies and says that everything Pete heard was correct, as Jesse believes that Pete and Bridget would both be better off without him. Some time later Jesse is urged by others to visit Pete in the hospital (as he has had surgery) and apologize, but after Jesse leaves the building he is severely beaten by an associate named Skinhead Rob, who is angry that Jesse had stopped doing business with him due to Jesse spending most of his time with Pete.

Afterwards Jesse manages to barely contact someone to pick him up before he blacks out. A day or two later Jesse attends the school's homecoming celebration, where he watches Ken and Theresa (an upbeat, overweight girl and friend of Bridget) get crowned king and queen—something that Jesse arranged to happen. He's approached by Bridget, who expresses concern over Jesse's appearance and upon some prodding, reluctantly states that Ken has been a good boyfriend so far. This exchange is witnessed by Ken, who tries to beat Jesse but is unsuccessful as he is caught by Bridget, who demands to know what is going on. At this point Pete steps forward and divulges that Ken had Jesse investigate her and set the two of them up, which causes Bridget to grow disgusted with both boys. Weeks later Jesse approaches Pete at the Special Olympics, where he finally admits to Pete that he has missed him terribly and that he views him as his best friend. The two boys make up and Jesse also later makes up with Bridget, with whom he finally shares a kiss.

== Development ==
Spears began writing Sway with the intent to focus on the friendship between two main characters, Jesse and Pete, and to use the book's romance as a secondary plot device to create tension between the two of them. She drew upon elements from the story of Cyrano de Bergerac, but also from her own years as a teenager. Spears also drew upon biblical history classes she took during college and has also described the book as "my imagining of what a friendship between Jesus and St. Peter would look like in a contemporary high school setting—with loads of artistic license, of course." Prior to completing the book Spears wrote about 600 pages of plot details before finishing her final draft, which was at 300 pages.

== Reception ==
Critical reception for Sway has been predominantly positive, and the book has received praise from the Richmond Times Dispatch. Publishers Weekly and the School Library Journal both gave favorable reviews, and the School Library Journal wrote that the work was an "engaging story that will stay with readers long past the final page." The Bulletin of the Center for Children's Books stated that "Perspective is handled beautifully: Bridget clearly only appears perfect because she’s focalized through Jesse, while readers get glimpses of the real Jesse through the responses of other characters, particularly Bridget, keeping him wholly sympathetic even at his most jerkish moments. Readers will thus be torn between wanting a guy like him around to make things happen and wanting to fix him so he isn’t that guy anymore, and they’ll be heartened when he ends up a little of both."
