= Lucienne Lanaz =

Swiss film director

Lucienne Lanaz (born 1937) is a Swiss documentary filmmaker. Her work was recognized in 2017 with the Prize for the Arts, Literature and Sciences of the Bernese Jura council (Conseil du Jura bernois, CJB).

== Career ==
Lucienne Lanaz was born in 1937 in Zürich. She grew up in Zürich and lives and works in a farmhouse in Grandval in the Bernese Jura. Her various training as a commercial clerk and sports teacher and her work as a secretary at the International Committee of the Red Cross (ICRC) and as a simultaneous translator at film festivals kept her on the move. From 1972 she worked as an assistant in Swiss film productions. In 1974, she worked with Marcel Leiser on the documentary Le Bonheur à septante ans (Late Happiness), and with her first documentary Fire, Smoke, Sausages (The Smoking Kitchen, 1976), she became an independent director and producer. She founded her own production company, Jura-Films, in order to release her films herself. Because the situation for female filmmakers was catastrophic, a number of female filmmakers, including Isa Hesse, Greti Kläy, Isolde Marxer and Tula Roy, got together and founded the association CH-Filmfrauen in 1975, which was active until the end of the 1980s. A text by Lucienne Lanaz about the women's film festival in Sorrento around 1977 describes the situation in the 1980s and 1990s:

The women's group 'Nemesis', self-confident, young, beautiful Italian women, had organized the festival and, among others, films by Isa and me were shown. One evening, the 'Nemesis' women suggested we go to a disco. What happens in southern Italy when twenty or so women come into a place like this and dance together without paying attention to the men? Noise! It started with the emptying of champagne glasses into the women's cleavage and other physical aggression and continued with man against woman, woman against man, hardly believable, but true. The restaurant was closed by the owner without further ado and men and women found themselves in the large square, where the battle continued: with flower pots, in the presence of journalists and police officers. The men didn't lift a finger to help the women, even when the ambulance had to come to take one of the women who had been hit by a flowerpot to hospital. The second experience has nothing to do with Italy, but with Switzerland. In the same week, a 'Swiss Film Week' took place in Sorrento, organized by Mr Boissonas of Pro Helvetia. The invited guests included Robert Boner, Freddy Buache, Rolf Lyssy, Georg Radanowicz, Francis Reusser and Alain Tanner. Isa and I were surprised that we were not invited to the Swiss reception - and so, as the Swiss delegation of film women, we simply turned up at the reception without being asked and complained publicly about being 'forgotten'. An embarrassing silence. I still wonder today whether we were ever forgiven for this 'faux pas'. For a few years, we managed to encourage a women's group to meet loosely, to discuss, exchange ideas about films and collaborate. For example, Dorothy Cox, Dagmar Heinrich, Isolde Marxer, Su Meili, Verena Moser, Marianne Pletscher, Ingrid Städelin and Maya Wegmüller met in Cugnasco with Isa in 1986. Isa, Tula Roy and I already belonged to the older generation ...

— Lucienne Lanaz, March 1995

In 1979/80, co-directed with Anne Cuneo, Erich Liebi and Urs Bolliger, she published the 75-minute humorous documentary on the Swiss film newsreel Ciné-journal au féminin (The Image of Women in the Swiss Film Newsreel), a research project to examine this medium for representations of women. Out of 9000 contributions, 300 were also about women and 12 were only about women. From the 1940s until 1975, the Schweizer Filmwochenschau broadcast current information in the cinema before the main film, which was intended to inform objectively and strengthen the independent spirit.

Lanaz has been an honorary member of the Swiss Association of Film Directors, a member of the Swiss Cinema Society Committee for 5 years, a member of the Photo, Cinema and Video Commission of the Canton of Bern for 8 years and an active member of the Alpinale-Vorarlberg, Austria film working group for 15 years.

Lanaz has worked at various international festivals. She was president, European commissioner, festival coordinator and member of the international jury of the Bludenz Festival (1990, 1993, 1997) and member of the international jury of the Bilbao (1978), Imola (1996), San Giovanni Lupatoto (1997), Oberhausen (2001) and Leeds (2001) festivals. In 2008, she gave film readings at the Freiburg School of Social Work as part of the Freiburg International Film Festival.

== Prizes and awards ==
- 1995: Grand Prix of the San Gio' Video Festival for her complete works
- 2017: Art, Literature and Science Prize of the Conseil du Jura bernois (CJB) for her life's work
- 2023: Bern Film Prize - special prize for her life's work and her many years of tireless commitment as an author, director and producer

== Awards for films ==
- 1989: International Jury Prize at the Visual Anthropology Festival in Pärnu, Estonia, for Feu, fumée, saucisse
- 2003: Silver Bear at the Festival of Nations in Ebensee, Austria, for Nous déclinons toute responsabilité...
- 2009: Award for best documentary at the Festival de Cine in Granada, Spain, for Nous déclinons toute responsabilité...
- 2016: One of the 12 prizes of the Fondation Créativité au Troisième Age for L'enfance retrouvée
