= Susan Wayland =

German fashion model

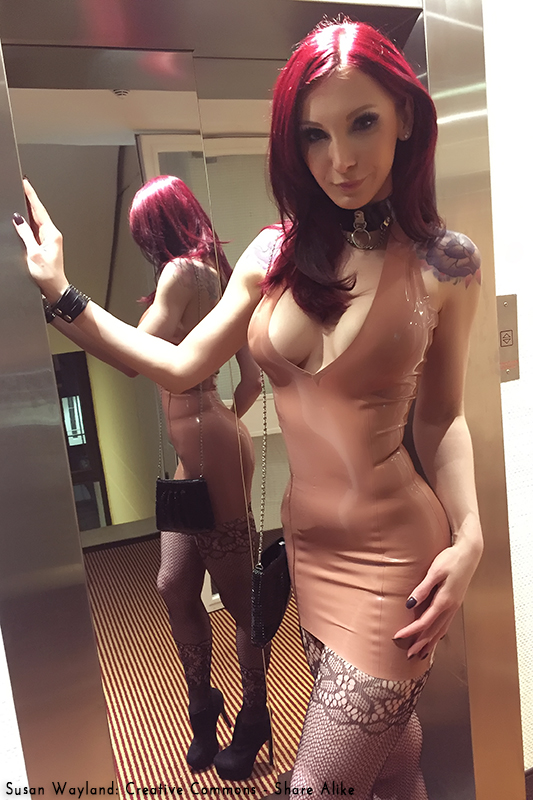
- On latex event Germany
- Born: June 23, 1980 (age 46); Leipzig, East Germany
- Website: https://susanwaylandofficial.one

Susan Wayland (born June 23, 1980 in Leipzig, East Germany) is a German fashion model who features in photography, especially in the area of latex fetishism. She has appeared in numerous international men's magazines, commercial advertising, award-winning music video, and film. She is considered one of the top models in the latex sector.

== Biography ==
As a teenager, Wayland (nicknamed "Sway") was interested in playing different characters and was involved in various theatre projects and dance groups. In 1999, she began collegiate study in Braunschweig and met glamour and fashion photographer Norman Richter. Richter and Wayland developed a mutual interest in creating interesting and artistic visions and discovered latex as a clothing material for artistic latex fashion photography. Her model work turned soon from hobby to fashion. After graduation at university in 2007 Wayland began working as professional latex model. In 2012 Wayland left the business with Richter. Since then Wayland has pursued a solo career as a latex fashion model.

== Career ==
Wayland's work soon gained notice from prominent fetish and latex publications and sites. Soon Wayland was gaining more exposure, experience, and was more actively modeling and performing. She worked with notable fetish and alternative photographers such as Peter W. Czernich, Martin Perreault, Roman Kasperski and latex/fetish designers and companies including Patrice Catanzaro, Westwardbound, Marquis Fashion, Cathouse Clothing and Pandora Deluxe. Since 2014 Wayland has produced the online magazine 'Finest-Addiction' and became a full part of the creative team of S&M Photography. Since 2017 Wayland has been the ambassador of the latex care product VIVISHINE.

=== Publications ===
From 2004, Wayland's print career started to pick up, and she appeared on advertisements and flyers for Germany's biggest latex fetish events (for example, German Fetish Fair 2004 and multiple Lounge Bizarre flyers). Other credits included magazines, websites, calendars, and directories such as Full-size issue #3 (2005), Dark Spy issue #17 (2007), DDIMag issue #63 (2007), Fet-X issue #1 (2007), Gum issue #203, Marquis issue #37 and issue '43, Massad issue #227, Skin Two issue #52, Pirate issue #98, and the cover of FORUM (November 2009). Wayland has since worked on various video and photographic projects with well-known models of the latex scene like Bianca Beauchamp, Emily Marilyn, and Ancilla Tilia.

=== Video ===
Wayland performed in the award-winning music video Wrong Love by Smatka Molot. The video won the 2006 Hollywood Award for the best music video and the 2007 New York Independent Film Festival's best international music video.

Wayland has gone on to become one of Germany's best known fetish models and performers and has gained recognition with numerous write-ups in fetish and industry publications.

== See also ==
- Fetish photography
- Fetish model
