= Did You Ever See a Lassie? =

Nursery rhyme

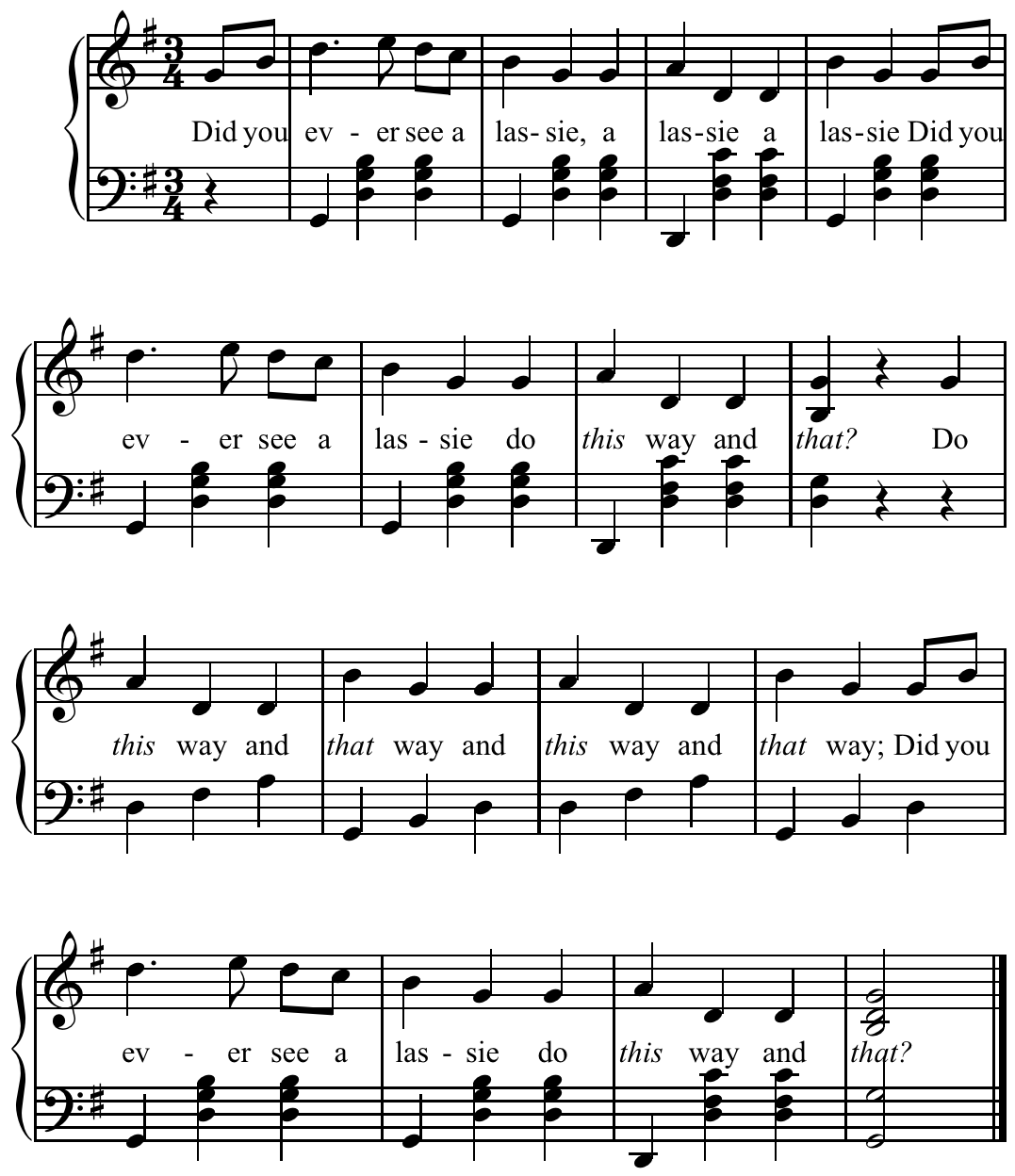
"Did You Ever See a Lassie"

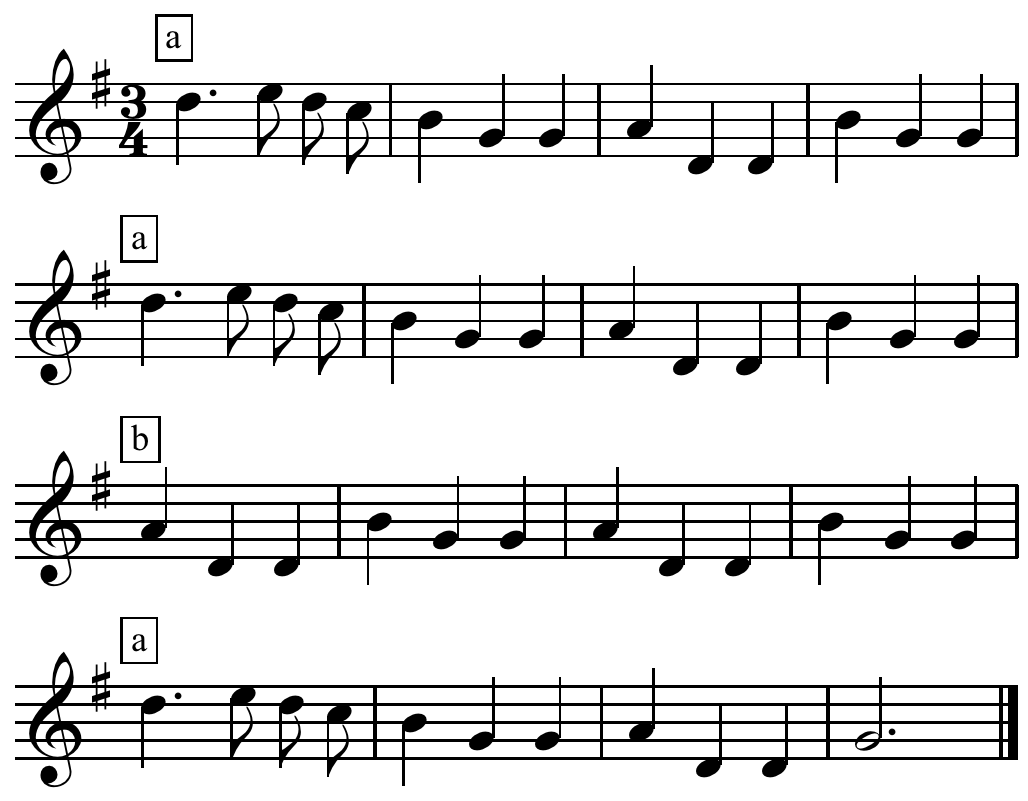
"Ach! du lieber Augustin".

"Did You Ever See a Lassie?" is a traditional Scottish folk song with a Roud Folk Song Index number of 5040.

== Lyrics ==
Modern versions of the lyrics include:

Did you ever see a lassie,
A lassie, a lassie?
Did you ever see a lassie
Go this way and that?

Go this way and that way,
Go this way and that way.
Did you ever see a lassie
Go this way and that?

Did you ever see a laddie,
A laddie, a laddie?
Did you ever see a laddie
Go this way and that?

Go this way and that way,
Go this way and that way.
Did you ever see a laddie
Go this way and that?

== Origins ==
The terms "lassie" and "laddie" have led several authors to place this song's origins in Scotland (see "references" section), but it was first collected in the United States in the last decade of the nineteenth century and was not found in Great Britain until the mid-twentieth century. The words may have come from Scottish immigrants or Scottish-Americans.

Along with "The More We Get Together", it is generally sung to the same tune as "Oh du lieber Augustin", a song written in Germany or Vienna in the late seventeenth century.

It was first published in 1909, in Games for the Playground, Home, School and Gymnasium by Jessie Hubbell Bancroft.

== As a game ==
The song is often accompanied by a circle singing game. Players form a circle and dance around one player. When they reach the end of the verse they stop, the single in the middle performs an action (such as Highland dancing), which everyone then imitates, before starting the verse again, often changing the single player to a boy, or a boy can join the center player - thus creating an extra verse in the song ("Did you ever see a laddie...").

== References in popular culture and children's media ==
The song is featured in the 1963 motion picture Ladybug, Ladybug. In the movie, children sing the song as part of a game while walking home from school during a nuclear bomb attack drill.

The song, as sung by children, was used in a 1990 commercial for Maidenform, and played over a succession of pictures of women in uncomfortable-looking clothing, was followed by the tag-line, "Isn't it nice to live in a time when women aren't being pushed around so much anymore?"

The song is featured in an episode of The Simpsons, "The Otto Show", and was titled "Hail to the Bus Driver".

The song is featured in Mothers' Instinct (2024 film).
