= The More We Get Together =

American children's song

"The More We Get Together", now regarded today as a popular English-language children's song, of American origin, was originally written by Irving King as the anthem of the Ancient Order of Froth Blowers, to be sung to an old Viennese tune, "O du lieber Augustin". Sheet music of the drinking song and a gramophone recording were issued during the 1920s. Later it featured as a cowboy song in the Columbia Pictures movie series, this time as "The More We Get Together", in Challenge of the Range (1949) and in The Rough, Tough West (1952).

== Lyrics ==
=== Original ===
Oh, the more we are together,
Together, together,
Oh, the more we are together,
The merrier we'll be.
For your friends are my friends
And my friends are your friends.
So the more we are together,
The merrier we'll be.

=== Later ===
The more we get together,
Together, together,
The more we get together,
The happier we'll be.
For your friends are my friends
And my friends are your friends.
The more we get together,
The happier we'll be.
