= James Duncan =

James, Jim, or Jimmy Duncan may refer to:

== Politicians ==
- James Duncan (Pennsylvania politician) (1756–1844), American politician from Pennsylvania
- James Duncan (MP for Barrow-in-Furness) (1858–1911), British lawyer and Liberal politician
- James H. Duncan (1793–1869), American politician from Massachusetts
- James Hastings Duncan (1855–1928), British Liberal Member of Parliament for Otley, 1900–1918
- Jim Duncan (Alaska politician) (born 1942), former Speaker of the Alaska House of Representatives, congressional candidate
- Jimmy Duncan (politician) (born 1947), American politician from Tennessee
- Sir James Duncan, 1st Baronet (1899–1974), British politician

== Scientists, physicians, engineers ==
- James Duncan (biomedical engineer), (born 1951), American professor of Biomedical Engineering at Yale
- James Duncan (surgeon) (1810–1866), Scottish surgeon and main manufacturer of chloroform in 19th century Britain
- James Duncan (zoologist) (1804–1861), Scottish naturalist
- James Matthews Duncan (1826–1890), Scottish physician

== Sportspeople ==
- James Duncan (discus thrower) (1887–1955), American athlete
- James Duncan (football left-back) (fl. 1878–1882), Scottish footballer (Alexandra Athletic, Rangers and Scotland)
- James Duncan (football outside left) (fl. 1890–1893), Scottish footballer (Sheffield United)
- James Duncan (basketball) (born 1977), basketball coach
- Jamie Duncan (born 1975), American football linebacker
- Jim Duncan (baseball) (1871–1901), American catcher and first baseman in Major League Baseball
- Jim Duncan (cornerback) (1946–1972), American football player
- Jim Duncan (defensive end) (1924–2011), American football player and coach
- Jim Duncan (footballer) (born 1938), English professional footballer
- Jimmy Duncan (footballer, born 1930) (1930–2014), Scottish footballer
- Jimmy Duncan (rugby union) (1869–1953), New Zealand rugby union footballer, coach and referee

== Others ==
- James Duncan (art collector) (1834–1905), Scottish sugar refiner and philanthropist
- James Duncan (bishop) (1913–2000), Episcopal bishop in America
- James Duncan (missionary) (1813–1907), New Zealand missionary and Presbyterian minister
- James Duncan (musician) (born 1968), Canadian-born musician, improviser and house music producer
- James Duncan (union leader) (1857–1928), Scottish-American union leader
- James Duncan (United States Army officer) (1811–1849), American artillery officer of the Mexican–American War
- Jimmy Duncan (songwriter) (1927–2011), American songwriter
- James Elmslie Duncan (1822–1854), English Chartist poet, editor, writer, and activist
- James K. L. Duncan (1845–1913), American soldier and Medal of Honor recipient
- James Duncan (tailor), Scottish tailor and landowner

== See also ==
- Duncan James (born 1978), British singer with the band Blue
- Duncan James (disambiguation)
