= Kid Stuff Records =

Defunct children's record label

- Parent company: Acclaim Entertainment
- Founded: 1975
- Distributors: A.A./Wonderland; IJE Publishing, Inc.
- Genre: Various
- Country of origin: US
- Location: Hollywood, Florida, United States

Kid Stuff Records, also known originally as The Kid Stuff Repertory Company, was an American record label founded in 1975 by Bob McAllister, Artie Kaplin, and Dick Mullen, as a children's music label. It was headquartered and located in Hollywood, Florida, in the Washington Federal Building across from the Hollywood Mall.

The label's albums (including both read-along records and full-length LPs) were mostly tie-ins for franchises such as the DC Super Powers Collection, Care Bears, The Pink Panther, Strawberry Shortcake, Fat Albert, Garfield, E.T. The Extra-Terrestrial, and Masters of the Universe, along with video games such as Pac-Man, Missile Command, and Yars' Revenge. It also had a home video division called Kid Vid (not to be confused with NBC's Kidd Video).

== Discography ==
=== LP albums ===
Album	Year	Pr. #
Beginning Language: French	1987	BLP 2
Beginning Language: Spanish	1987	BLP 4, BLT 41
The Secret of the Sword	1985	DAR 3900-LP, DAT 4900-TAPE
The Care Bears Movie	1985	DAR 3901-LP, DAT 4901-TAPE
Alice in Wonderland	1985	DAR 3902-LP, DAT 4902-TAPE
My Little Pony: The Movie	1986	DAR 3903-LP, DAT 4903-TAPE
Care Bears Movie II: A New Generation	1986	DAR 3905-LP, DAT 4905-TAPE
Teach 'n Talk: Preschool Alphabet	1987	KHS 1201
Richard Scarry's Find Your ABC's	1985	KKS 1020-LP, KKT 44020-TAPE
The Popples' First Fun-Filled Album!: The Perfect Popples Policy	1986	KKS 1022-LP, KKT 44022-TAPE
It's O.K. to Say No!	1985	KKS 1026-LP, KKT 44026-TAPE
My Body Is My Own!	1985	KKS 1027-LP, KKT 44027-TAPE
Sometimes It's O.K. to Tell Secrets!	1985	KKS 1028-LP, KKT 44028-TAPE
It's O.K. to Say No to Drugs!	1986	KKS 1035-LP, KKT 44035-TAPE
Webster: Good Secrets! Bad Secrets!	1986	KKS 1036-LP, KKT 44036-TAPE
Sectaurs: Warriors of Symbion	1985	KKS 5056-LP, KKT 4056-TAPE
Raggedy Ann & Andy Happiness Album	1981	KPD 6001
Strawberry Shortcake and Her Friends	1981	KPD 6002
Barbie and Her Friends	1981	KPD 6003
Benji and His Friends	1981	KPD 6004
A True Space Adventure: Space Shuttle Columbia	1982	KPD 6005
The Songs of Paddington	1982	KPD 6008
The Pink Panther Country Album	1982	KPD 6010
Strawberry Shortcake - Over the Rainbow	1982	KPD 6011
The Pac-Man Album	1982	KPD 6012
Meet the Berenstain Bears	1982	KPD 6014
Introducing the Care Bears	1982	KPD 6016
Welcome to McDonaldland	1983	KPD 6017
Masters of the Universe	1983	KPD 6018
The Care Bears Adventures in Care-a-Lot	1983	KPD 6019
E.T., I Love You and Just Us Two	1983	KR 77001
The Three Little Pigs and Other Fun Songs to Sing	?	KS 003
The Story of Alice in Wonderland	?	KS 004
The Story of Cinderella and Songs I Like to Sing	1978	KS 005
The Story of Pinocchio and Songs I Like to Sing	1978	KS 006
Mother Goose Rhymes	1978	KS 007
Star Wars	1978	KS 008
It's a Small World	1978	KS 009
Night Fever and More Songs from Saturday Night Fever	1979	KS 010
The Story of The Wizard of Oz		KS 011
Songs from "You're a Good Man, Charlie Brown!"	?	KS 012
The Story of Rumpelstilskin and Fun Songs to Sing	?	KS 013
The Story of the Emperor's New Clothes		KS 014
The Story of Sleeping Beauty and Songs I Like to Sing		KS 015
The Story of Hansel & Gretel and Songs I Like to Sing		KS 016
The Story of Goldilocks and Other Fun Songs to Sing	1977	KS 017
Old McDonald	?	KS 019
The Sounds of Christmas	?	KS 020
Creativity - Starring Fat Albert and the Cosby Kids	1980	KS 021
My Storytime Record		KS 022
The Story of Snow White and the Seven Dwarfs	1977	KS 023
Rudolph the Red Nosed Reindeer	1977	KS 025
Jack and the Beanstalk	1977	KS 026
The Story of Peter Pan and Songs I Like to Sing		KS 027
My Birthday Record	1978	KS 028
Halloween - Starring Fat Albert and the Cosby Kids	1980	KS 029
The Story of Puss in Boots and Fun Songs to Sing	1977	KS 030
Songs from Around the World	?	KS 031
Mostly Ghostly	1977	KS 032
Songs of America	1978	KS 034
I'd Like to Teach the World to Sing	?	KS 035
This Land Is Your Land	1978	KS 036
Yankee Doodle	1978	KS 038
Rubber Duckie & Other Pet Songs	1978	KS 039
Let's Listen... Then Sing	1977	KS 040
Bedtime Songs	1978	KS 041
The Alphabet Song	1978	KS 042
Fun Time Songs	1977	KS 044
Treasury of Song	1978	KS 046
Peter Cottontail and Other Fun Songs	1977	KS 049
Candy Man and Other Sweet Songs	1977	KS 050
The Story of Rapunzel and Fun Songs to Sing	1977	KS 051
The Hare and the Tortoise and Other Aesop Fables	1978	KS 052
Aesop Fables	1978	KS 053
East of the Sun and Other Norwegian Folktales Volume I	1978	KS 054
East of the Sun and Other Norwegian Folktales Volume II	1978	KS 055
Songs of Love and Life for Little Ones	?	KS 056
The Ivory City and the Fairy Princess	?	KS 057
A Dragon Named "Blue" & Other Fairy Tales	?	KS 058
Traditional Stories for Children	?	KS 059
The Prince and the Dragon	?	KS 060
The Prince and the Golden Apple	1977	KS 064
Ogre on the Hill/The Meadow Fairy	?	KS 065
The Cat on the Dovrefell & Other Children's Folk Tales	?	KS 066
Stories from the Arabian Nights	?	KS 067
Children's Singing Games	?	KS 068
Folk Songs for Little Americans	?	KS 069
Mr. Frog's Animal Friends	1978	KS 070
Songs and Games for a Rainy Day	1978	KS 072
Children's Introduction to Rock & Roll	1978	KS 073
Sing Children Sing	1978	KS 074
Disco Duck	1978	KS 075
Songs and Poetry for the Seasons	1978	KS 076
Peter and the Wolf - Also The Magician's Shoes	1978	KS 077
The Story of the Runaway Circus	1978	KS 078
Famous Presidents	1978	KS 079
Round-Up Time	1978	KS 080
Songs from Saturday Night Fever	1978	KS 081
Children's Version of Grease	1978	KS 082
Hans Christian Andersen Fairy Tales	1978	KS 083
Brothers Grimm Fairy Tales	1978	KS 084
YMCA and Other Disco Hits	1979	KS 086
Bible Stories	1979	KS 087
The Story of Heidi	1979	KS 088
Songs from The Wiz	1978	KS 089
A Christmas Carol	1978	KS 090
My Favorite Stories - Billy Goat's Gruff, Mother Holly, The Fisherman & His Wife	1978	KS 092
"Rock 'N Roll Disco" with Fat Albert and the Junkyard Band!	1980	KS 094
Beauty and the Beast	1978	KS 095
Animal Stories & Songs	1978	KS 096
My First Disco Album	1979	KS 097
The Story of Ali Baba & the Forty Thieves	1978	KS 098
The Story of The Red Shoes	1978	KS 100
The Story of The Snow Queen	1978	KS 101
The Story of The Little Match Girl	1978	KS 102
The Story of The Tinder Box	1978	KS 103
The Story of The Gingerbread Man	1978	KS 106
The Story of Tom Thumb	1978	KS 109
The Story of The Happy Prince	1978	KS 110
Aladdin and his Wonderful Lamp	1978	KS 111
The Story of The Nutcracker Suite	1978	KS 112
The Story of Tom Sawyer	1978	KS 114
The Story of Huckleberry Finn	1978	KS 115
The Princess and the Pea	1978	KS 116
Pink Panther Punk	1981	KS 117
The Story of Dracula	1978	KS 118
The Story of Gulliver's Travels	1978	KS 119
Sinbad the Sailor	1978	KS 120
Robert Louis Stevenson's Treasure Island	1978	KS 121
The Story of Oliver	1978	KS 122
Peter Pan and the Lost Planet	1978	KS 123
The Legend of Sleepy Hollow	1978	KS 124
The Story of Johnny Appleseed	1978	KS 126
The H.M.S. Pinafore	1978	KS 127
The Story of Hans Brinker and the Silver Skates	1978	KS 128
The Story of Simple Simon	1978	KS 129
Around the World in 80 Days	1978	KS 130
A Child's Introduction to Words	1978	KS 131
Telling Time Is Fun	1978	KS 132
Babes in Toyland	1978	KS 133
Androcles and the Lion	1978	KS 134
The Story of The Three Musketeers	1978	KS 135
The Story of The First Thanksgiving	1978	KS 136
The Story of Robin Hood	1978	KS 138
The Story of Paul Revere	1978	KS 139
The Story of Don Quixote	1978	KS 141
The Pied Piper of Hamelin	1978	KS 142
A Child's Introduction to Numbers	1978	KS 143
Sergeant Pepper's Lonely Hearts Club Band and Other Movie Songs	1978	KS 144
The Story of The Canterville Ghost	1978	KS 146
Star Trek and Other Movie Songs	1978	KS 147
Mother Goose Disco	1978	KS 148
More Grease	1978	KS 150
Hickory Dickory Dock	1978	KS 151
The Story of King Kong	1978	KS 153
The Land of Oz	1979	KS 154
David and Goliath	1979	KS 155
The Sword and the Stone	1979	KS 156
The Story of Santa's Workshop	1978	KS 157
Shake Your Booty	1979	KS 158
Shadow Dancing and Other Disco Favorites	1979	KS 159
Raggedy Ann & Andy's Dance Party	1980	KS 160
The World of Strawberry Shortcake - Original TV Soundtrack	1980	KS 165
Strawberry Shortcake Sweet Songs	1980	KS 166
Counting Rhymes	1978	KS 167
Let's Learn to Spell	1978	KS 168
The Story of Time Machine	1978	KS 169
The Story of Ivanhoe	1978	KS 170
Nursery Rhyme Disco	1978	KS 171
Reading, Writing & Arithmetic	1978	KS 172
The Story of Channukah	1978	KS 173
The Story of War of the Worlds	1978	KS 174
'Twas the Night Before Christmas	1978	KS 175
The Frog Prince	1978	KS 176
The Story of King Arthur and the Knights of the Round Table	1978	KS 178
A Child's Introduction to Shakespeare — A Midsummer's Night Dream	1978	KS 180
The Story of Romeo & Juliet	1978	KS 181
The Story of Snow White and Rose Red	1978	KS 182
The Story of Frankenstein	1978	KS 183
The Story of Paul Bunyon	1978	KS 185
The Story of Swiss Family Robinson	1978	KS 186
Journey to the Center of the Earth	1978	KS 187
Moby Dick	1978	KS 188
The Little Drummer Boy	1978	KS 189
The Prince and the Pauper	1978	KS 190
Hans Christian Andersen's The Ugly Duckling	1978	KS 191
The Jungle Book	1978	KS 192
An Easter Story - Bunny Business	1978	KS 193
Stop Look Listen	1978	KS 194
The Story of Robinson Crusoe	1978	KS 195
Hans Christian Andersen's The Story of The Steadfast Tin Soldier	1978	KS 196
Jules Verne's 20000 Leagues Under the Sea	1978	KS 197
A Kid Disco Record — Why Can't We Be Friends	1978	KS 199
Rock Your Baby	1978	KS 200
"Golden Treasury of"... Children's Songs (Disco Style)	1978	KS 201
"Tunes for Tots" (Disco Style)	1978	KS 202
Supercalifragilisticexpialidocious and Other Silly Songs	1978	KS 203
Joy to the World and Other Happy Songs	1978	KS 204
Ivan Kivitt's The Witch Who Stole Toyland	1978	KS 205
The Brothers Grimm: Brementown Musicians	1978	KS 207
The Brother's Grimm: The Dancing Princesses	1978	KS 208
Aesop's Fables: The Grasshopper and the Ant	1978	KS 209
Uncle Remus and the Tar Baby	1978	KS 210
The Story of Dr. Jekyll & Mr. Hyde	1978	KS 212
The Story of Black Beauty	1978	KS 213
The Story of George Washington	1978	KS 214
The Story of Abraham Lincoln	1978	KS 215
A Golden Treasury of Nursery Rhymes	1978	KS 216
Sea Songs	1978	KS 219
Animal Songs	1978	KS 220
Disco Dance Party	1978	KS 221
The Story of Little Women	1978	KS 222
The Story of The Goose Girl	1978	KS 224
The Story of A Connecticut Yankee in King Arthur's Court	1978	KS 225
Rudyard Kipling's The Cat Who Walked	1978	KS 227
A Little Traveling Music	1978	KS 228
A Child's Introduction to The Beatles	1978	KSB 1001
A Child's Introduction to Elvis Presley	1978	KSB 1002
Pinball Wizard and Other Elton John Hits	1978	KSB 1003
Songs and Stories About the People in My Neighborhood	1978	KSB 1004
Send in the Clowns	1978	KSB 1005
Hans Christian Andersen's Fairy Tales	1978	KSB 1006
The Story of Puff the Magic Dragon	1978	KSB 1007
A Christmas Sing-A-Long	1978	KSB 1009
A Child's Introduction to John Denver's Songs	1978	KSB 1010
A Child's Introduction to Disco	1978	KSB 1011
A Child's Introduction to the Alphabet	1978	KSB 1012
Strawberry Shortcake's "Touch Your Toes, Touch Your Nose." Exercise and Fun Album	1981	KSB 1014
Barbie Looking Good Feeling Great Exercise Album	1983	KSB 1016
Bugs Bunny Exercise & Adventure Album	1982	KSB 1017
Rocky: Fun and Fitness	1983	KSB 1018
Tomorrow and Other Songs from Annie!	?	KSD 002
A Disco Christmas	1979	KSD 024
Strawberry Shortcake's Country Jamboree	1981	KSS 085
Raggedy Ann & Andy Pop Concert	1981	KSS 137
Raggedy Ann & Andy Birthday Party	1980	KSS 162
Strawberry Shortcake in Big Apple City — Original Soundtrack	1981	KSS 163
Pink Panther Rock & Roll	1981	KSS 5003
Pink Panther Party Time	1981	KSS 5004
Strawberry Shortcake Christmas Album	1981	KSS 5005
Raggedy Ann & Andy Christmas Party	1981	KSS 5006
A Pink Panther Christmas	1981	KSS 5007
Barbie Country Favorites	1981	KSS 5008
Barbie Christmas	1981	KSS 5009
Barbie Dance Party	1981	KSS 5010
Barbie Birthday Album	1981	KSS 5011
Raggedy Ann & Andy: Bend & Stretch	1982	KSS 5013
Strawberry Shortcake's "I Love You!"	1982	KSS 5014
The Story, Sounds and Melodies from Joe Camp's Family Film "Benji"	1982	KSS 5015
Marmaduke Stories & Songs	1982	KSS 5016
Raggedy Ann & Andy: Telling Time Is Fun	1980	KSS 5017
The Amazing Musical Monchhichi Album	1982	KSS 5018
Barbie Sing-along	1981	KSS 5019
Nancy: Listen, Laugh & Learn	1982	KSS 5020
Michael Bond's Paddington and Friends	1982	KSS 5022
The Amazing Adventures of Pac-Man	1982	KSS 5023
Strawberry Shortcake Presents Pets on Parade	1982	KSS 5024
Strawberry Shortcake Alphabet Record	1983	KSS 5025
Broadway Songs for Children — Including Tomorrow	1982	KSS 5026
Pac-Man Christmas Album	1982	KSS 5029
Strawberry Shortcake: Let's Dance	1982	KSS 5030
Missile Command	1982	KSS 5031
Asteroids	1982	KSS 5032
Yars' Revenge	1982	KSS 5033
The Care Bears Care for You	1983	KSS 5034
The Adventures of Flash Gordon	1982	KSS 5035
A Very Merry McBirthday from Ronald McDonald	1983	KSS 5036
Donkey Kong	1983	KSS 5037
The Care Bears Adventures in Care-a-Lot	1983	KSS 5038
E.T., I Love You and Other Extra-Terrestrial Songs for Children	1983	KSS 5039
The Care Bears Christmas	1983	KSS 5040
Strawberry Shortcake: I Love Numbers	1983	KSS 5041
Masters of the Universe	1983	KSS 5042
Tarzan	1984	KSS 5043
G.I. Joe: Castle of the Doomed	1984	KSS 5044
Strawberry Shortcake Presents Splash Dance Party	1984	KSS 5045
Dungeons & Dragons: Quest for the Cursed Bone	1984	KSS 5046
With Love from Poochie	1984	KSS 5047
The Care Bears Off to See the World	1983	KSS 5048
The Care Bears Birthday Party	1984	KSS 5050
The Transformers: Attack of the Decepticons	1985	KSS 5052
2010: The Year We Make Contact	1984	KSS 5053
Sectaurs: Warriors of Symbion	1985	KSS 5056
Raggedy Ann & Andy's Alphabet & Numbers	1980	KSS 5161
Strawberry Shortcake Live	1981	KSS 5950
Sing Along		SP 1
Merry Christmas	?	SP 2
Jack and the Beanstalk and Other Fun Songs		SP 3
White Christmas	1978	SP 4
My Favorite Stories Featuring: The Frog Prince, The Toymaker, The Magic Man		SP 5
Zoo Parade		SP 6
Strawberry Shortcake: The Circus Comes to Strawberry Land	1982	SP 6
Care Bears Happiness Book	1983	SP 7
Care Bears: Friends Make Everything Better	1986	SPEC 77

=== Book and record sets ===
==== KSR series ====
Title	Year	Pr. #
The Story of Old Mother Hubbard	1979	KSR 329
The Story of Peter Rabbit	1979	KSR 330
The Story of Goosey Goosey Gander	1979	KSR 332
The Story of Humpty Dumpty	1979	KSR 333
The Story of Three Billy Goats Gruff	1979	KSR 336
The Story of Frosty the Snowman	1979	KSR 337
The Story of Noah's Ark	1979	KSR 341
The Story of City Mouse Country Mouse	1979	KSR 344
The Story of Kris Kringle's Christmas	1979	KSR 345
The Story of Little Boy Blue	1979	KSR 346
The Story of Jack & Jill	1979	KSR 347
The Story of Little Miss Muffet	1979	KSR 348
The Story of Little Jack Horner	1979	KSR 352
The Story of Old King Cole	1979	KSR 354
Aesop's Fables: The Fox & The Crow	1979	KSR 356
The Story of The Twelve Days of Christmas	1979	KSR 358
Sing-A-Long Song Book - Christmas Songs	1979	KSR 359
The Story of Georgie Porgie	1979	KSR 361
How the Alphabet Came to Be	1979	KSR 364
Sing-A-Long Song Book - Yellow Submarine and other Beatle songs	1979	KSR 366
The Story of Casey at the Bat	1979	KSR 367
Sing-A-Long Song Book – Happy Songs	1979	KSR 368
Sing-A-Long Song Book – Cowboy Songs	1979	KSR 369
Sing-A-Long Song Book – Easter Songs	1979	KSR 372
Aesop's Fables: The Miller, his Son, & their Donkey	1979	KSR 375
What Little Girls Are Made Of	1979	KSR 378
The Story of The Hunchback of Notre Dame	1979	KSR 381
The Red Badge of Courage	1979	KSR 382
The Count of Monte Cristo	1979	KSR 383
Jules Verne's Voyage to the Moon	1979	KSR 388
The Story of The Invisible Man	1979	KSR 390
My Favorite Fairytale... Princess Moonbeam	1979	KSR 391
The Shy Little House	1979	KSR 392
The Story of How the Flag Came to Be	1979	KSR 397
Nursery Rhymes	1979	KSR 400
Grimm's Fairy Tales – The Three Tasks	1979	KSR 401
Grimm's Fairy Tales – The Drummer	1979	KSR 402
The Story of The Buccaneers	1979	KSR 403
Hans Christian Andersen's The Ugly Duckling	1979	KSR 404
The Story of Robin Hood Meets Little John	1979	KSR 405
Florence Nightingale	1979	KSR 406
The Story of The King of the Golden River	1979	KSR 407
Lochinvar	1979	KSR 411
The Story of King Solomon's Mines	1979	KSR 413
Pandora's Box	1979	KSR 414
Down the Rabbit Hole - From Alice in Wonderland	1979	KSR 418
Queen of Hearts - From Alice in Wonderland	1979	KSR 419
Moses in Egypt	1979	KSR 421
Pocahontas	1979	KSR 422
The Second Voyage of Sinbad	1979	KSR 424
A Tale of Two Cities	1979	KSR 425
The Story of Who Killed Cock Robin?	1979	KSR 430
Sing-A-Long Song Book – Counting Songs	1979	KSR 431
The Story of My First Birthday Party	1979	KSR 432
The Story of The Day the Snow Fell & Fell	1979	KSR 436
The Story of the Jolly Snowman	1979	KSR 438
A Beginning Reader – On a Trip Through the Jungle	1979	KSR 441
The Story of Amahl and the Night Visitors	1979	KSR 442
The Story of the Snow Flake That Cried	1979	KSR 444
The Story of Joan of Arc	1979	KSR 447
The Story of Francis Scott Key	1979	KSR 448
Bible Stories: King Solomon	1979	KSR 449
Riddles and Rhymes	1979	KSR 451
Sing-A-Long Song Book – Musical Games	1979	KSR 455
Sing-A-Long Song Book – My Book of Lullabies	1979	KSR 456
The Story of Jack Be Nimble	1979	KSR 458
The Story of Rain Rain Go Away!	1979	KSR 460
The Story of Snoopy and the Red Baron	1979	KSR 461
The Story of the Elephant and the Flea	1979	KSR 462
The Story of the Happy Clown	1979	KSR 463
The Wright Brothers First Flight	1979	KSR 466
The Story of The Owl & The Pussycat	1979	KSR 468
The Story of Monkey Business	1979	KSR 471
The Story of the Easter Bunny	1979	KSR 476
The Story of the First Thanksgiving	1979	KSR 481
Mother Holle by the Brothers Grimm	1979	KSR 484
Peter Pan Meets Captain Hook	1979	KSR 485
The Story of Little Tommy Tucker	1979	KSR 487
The Story of the Kitten Who Barked	1979	KSR 489
The Story of Adam & Eve	1979	KSR 490
The Adventure of Moppet Finds a Home	1979	KSR 492
The Adventures of Moppet Makes a Friend	1979	KSR 493
The Adventures of Moppet's Trip to the Farm	1979	KSR 496
Aesop's Fables – The Crow & The Pitcher	1979	KSR 499
The Lioness	1979	KSR 500
Hans Christian Andersen's The Boy Who Liked Puppets	1979	KSR 502
The Story of The Cat & The Fiddle	1979	KSR 503
Sing-A-Long Song Book – My First Song Book	1979	KSR 505
The Story of Buffalo Bill	1979	KSR 506
The Story of Hiawatha	1979	KSR 507
Sing-A-Long Song Book – Songs for a Rainy Day	1979	KSR 508
Baa Baa Black Sheep	1979	KSR 509
The Story of One, Two, Buckle My Shoe	1979	KSR 510
The Story of London Bridge	1979	KSR 512
The Story of the Crystal Ball	1979	KSR 515
The Story of the Creation	1979	KSR 516
The Story of the Three Blind Mice	1979	KSR 519
Sing-A-Long Song Book – Sing! Sing!	1979	KSR 522
Sing-A-Long Song Book – Safety Songs	1979	KSR 523
Riddle Riddle	1979	KSR 524
Sing-A-Long Song Book – Circus Songs	1979	KSR 525
Sing-A-Long Song Book – How Much Is That Doggie In The Window	1979	KSR 527
Sing-A-Long Song Book – My Favorite Folk Songs	1979	KSR 531
Sing-A-Long Song Book – My Book of Hymns	1979	KSR 534
Sing-A-Long Song Book – Sing and Play Songs	1979	KSR 535
The Story of the Farmer in the Dell	1979	KSR 538
The Story of Mary Had a Little Lamb	1979	KSR 540
Aesop's Fables – The Wolf in Sheeps Clothing	1979	KSR 544
The Story of the Oregon Trail	1979	KSR 551
Aesop's Fables – The Hare and The Hound	1979	KSR 567
The Story of Gepetto the Puppet Maker	1979	KSR 575
A Beginning Reader – My Grandfather's Clock	1979	KSR 580
From Lewis Carroll's "Cinderella" – The Glass Slipper	1979	KSR 581
A Beginning Reader – Words	1979	KSR 582
A Beginning Reader – A Day on the Farm	1979	KSR 584
A Beginning Reader – Animal Crackers	1979	KSR 587
A Beginning Reader – A Trip to the Pet Store	1979	KSR 589
The Pac-Man Christmas Story	1982	KSR 589
Rocky vs Clubber Lang	1983	KSR 590
A Beginning Reader – The Gentle Giraffe	1979	KSR 592
A Beginning Reader – My Friend the Clock	1979	KSR 595
Care Bears: 12 Days of Christmas	1983	KSR 596
A Beginning Reader – The Clown	1979	KSR 599
Mr. Easter Hare	1979	KSR 602
Nancy Drew: The Sea Monster Mystery	1983	KSR 602
Nancy Drew: The Secret of the Vanishing Pyramid	1983	KSR 603
Nancy Drew: The Case of the Whispering Ghost	1983	KSR 604
Skip to My Lou	1979	KSR 605
Masters of the Universe: He-Man & Battle Cat	1983	KSR 613
Masters of the Universe: The Revenge of Skeletor	1983	KSR 614
Masters of the Universe: Castle Grayskull	1983	KSR 615
Baby Pac-Man Goes to the Market	1982	KSR 616
The Adventures of Super Pac-Man	1982	KSR 617
Raggedy Ann & Andy's Alphabet	1980	KSR 625
Raggedy Ann & Andy's Rainy Day Songs & Games	1980	KSR 626
Raggedy Ann's Birthday Party	1980	KSR 627
Raggedy Ann & Andy's Songbook	1980	KSR 628
Raggedy Ann & Andy's Riddles and Rhymes	1982	KSR 629
Raggedy Ann & Andy's Merry Adventures	1982	KSR 630
Rocky's Book of Showmanship	1983	KSR 631
Rocky Saves the Day	1983	KSR 632
Rocky & Friends	1983	KSR 633
Mr. Potato Head Goes to the Market	1984	KSR 635
Ask Poochie	1984	KSR 636
Perfectly Poochie	1984	KSR 637
Dungeons & Dragons: Black Dragon Bog	1984	KSR 638
Dungeons & Dragons: Attack of the Assassins	1984	KSR 639
Dungeons & Dragons: Quest of the Riddles	1984	KSR 640
The Berenstain Bears: How to Get Along at School	1983	KSR 923
The Berenstain Bears: How to Get Along with Your Fellow Bear	1983	KSR 924
The Pink Panther's Jungle Safari	1981	KSR 925
The Pink Panther's Numbers Caper	1981	KSR 926
Strawberry Shortcake and Her Friends	1982	KSR 927
Strawberry Shortcake's Adventures in Strawberry Land	1980	KSR 928
Strawberry Shortcake's Sweet Songs		KSR 929
Story of Missile Command	1984	KSR 941
Story of Asteroids	1984	KSR 942
Story of Yars' Revenge	1984	KSR 943
Story of Super Breakout	1984	KSR 944
Story of Star Raiders	1984	KSR 945
Care Bears: A World Made of Love	1983	KSR 946
Care Bears: Bedtime Story	1983	KSR 947
Meet the Care Bears	1983	KSR 948
Ronald McDonald - Alphabet	1983	KSR 949
Ronald McDonald - One to Ten	1983	KSR 950
Benji's Adventure	1982	KSR 951
Benji Goes Camping	1982	KSR 952
The Dukes of Hazzard: Daredevil Danger	1983	KSR 953
Here Come the Dukes of Hazzard	1983	KSR 954
The Dukes of Hazzard	1983	KSR 955
Barbie: Camping Adventure	1981	KSR 962
Barbie's Neighborhood	1981	KSR 963
Barbie Goes to the City	1981	KSR 964
Raggedy Ann & Andy's Book of Manners	1981	KSR 965
Raggedy Ann & Andy at the Circus	1981	KSR 966
Strawberry Shortcake's Meets the Spelling Bee	1981	KSR 968
Strawberry Shortcake's Day in the Country		KSR 969
Strawberry Shortcake's A "Berry Merry Christmas"	1981	KSR 970
Raggedy Ann & Andy Christmas Fun Book	1981	KSR 671
Barbie: Christmas Party	1984	KSR 972
Strawberry Shortcake's Book of Words	1982	KSR 973
Strawberry Shortcake's School Days	1982	KSR 974
Benji in Love	1982	KSR 975
Benji Goes to School	1982	KSR 976
Let's Go Marmaduke	1982	KSR 977
It's Marmaduke	1982	KSR 978
The Original Monchhichi: ABC's	1982	KSR 979
The Original Monchhichi: Addition & Subtraction	1982	KSR 980
The Pink Panther Fun Book	1982	KSR 981
Barbie Travels Around the World	1982	KSR 982
Nancy's Fun with Numbers	1982	KSR 984
Nancy: My First Book	1982	KSR 985
Paddington: Please Look After This Bear	1982	KSR 986
Paddington: There's Nothing Like a Bear Bath	1982	KSR 987
Strawberry Shortcake presents: Blueberry Muffin & Cheesecake	1982	KSR 990
Strawberry Shortcake presents: Raspberry Tart & Rhubarb	1982	KSR 991
Strawberry Shortcake presents: Lemon Meringue & Frappé	1982	KSR 992
Strawberry Shortcake presents: Apricot & Hopsalot	1982	KSR 993
Strawberry Shortcake presents: Angel Cake & Soufflé	1982	KSR 994
Pac-Man: Run for Fun	1983	KSR 995
Pac-Man: Picnic	1983	KSR 996
Pac-Man Goes to Playland	1983	KSR 997
Flash Gordon: The Lost Planet	1983	KSR 998
Flash Gordon: Intergalactic Alien Guidebook	1983	KSR 999

==== DBR series ====
Title	Year	Pr. #
Garfield: The Knight in Shining Armor	1983	DBR 200
Garfield in Space	1983	DBR 201
Bugs Bunny's Space Carrot	1983	DBR 202
Tweety and Sylvester: Birds of a Feather	1984	DBR 203
Bugs Bunny Goes to the Dentist	1983	DBR 204
Pac-Man and the Ghost Diggers	1985	DBR 205
Ms. Pac-Man's Prize Pupil	1985	DBR 206
G.I. Joe: The Deadly Satellite	1983	DBR 207
G.I. Joe: The Captive City	1983	DBR 208
G.I. Joe: Challenge of the Clones	1983	DBR 209
Tarzan and his Friends	1983	DBR 210
Tarzan: King of the Apes	1983	DBR 211
Tarzan: Lost in the Jungle	1984	DBR 212
James Bond: Moonraker	1985	DBR 213
James Bond: The Spy Who Loved Me	1985	DBR 214
James Bond: Dr. No	1985	DBR 215
A Child's Introduction to Halley's Comet	1985	DBR 222
A Child's Introduction to The Return of Halley's Comet	1985	DBR 223
Schoolhouse Rock!: Three-Ring Government	1984	DBR 227
Schoolhouse Rock!: The Body Machine	1984	DBR 228
Schoolhouse Rock!: The Great American Melting Pot	1984	DBR 229
Firffels: Fird and the Firffel Reunion	1985	DBR 230
Firffels: Snyder Spider Is Missing!	1985	DBR 231
Firffels: Hyenant's Magical Red Coat	1985	DBR 232
The TV Chipmunks	1983	DBR 233
The Chipmunk Story	1983	DBR 234
May the Best Chipmunk Win	1983	DBR 235
The Chipmunks in Santa Harry	1983	DBR 236
Richard Scarry's On Vacation	1984	DBR 237
Richard Scarry's In My Town	1984	DBR 238
Richard Scarry's Learn to Count	1984	DBR 239
Masters of the Universe: The Thief of Castle Grayskull	1984	DBR 240
Masters of the Universe: Caverns of Fear	1984	DBR 241
The Care Bears Help Out	1985	DBR 242
The Care Bears' Garden	1985	DBR 243
My Little Pony: Lost in the Clouds	1985	DBR 244
My Little Pony: The Magic Rainbow	1955	DBR 245
Knight Rider: K.I.T.T. Vanishes	1985	DBR 246
Knight Rider: Highway to Danger	1985	DBR 247
The Transformers: Satellite of Doom	1985	DBR 248
The Transformers: When Continents Collide	1985	DBR 249
2001: A Space Odyssey	1985	DBR 250
2010: The Year We Make Contact	1985	DBR 251
The Scrabble People in I Love My Home	1985	DBR 253
The Scrabble People in My First Word Book	1985	DBR 254
The Scrabble People in A Day on the Farm	1985	DBR 255
My Little Pony: Glory, the Magic Unicorn	1986	DBR 256
Knight Rider: Target for Revenge	1985	DBR 257
The Transformers: Storms of Destruction	1985	DBR 258
Super Powers: Battle at the Earth's Core	1985	DBR 259
Super Powers: Darkseid ...of the Moon	1985	DBR 260
Super Powers: The Battle for Apokolips	1985	DBR 261
Dune Part 1: Battle of the Known Universe	1984	DBR 262
Dune Part 2: Attack of the Giant Sandworms	1984	DBR 263
Smurfing in the Air	1984	DBR 264
Smurf's Daydream	1984	DBR 265
The Chipmunks' Cruise	1984	DBR 268
The Chipmunks in Alvin Goes Wild	1984	DBR 269
Care Bears: Let's Get to Know the Care Bear Cousins	1985	DBR 270
Care Bear Cousins in A Day in the Forest of Feelings	1985	DBR 271
James Bond: A View to a Kill	1985	DBR 272
Richard Scarry's Please and Thank You Book	1985	DBR 273
How The Amazing Spider-Man and The Incredible Hulk Began	1985	DBR 275
The Story of Doctor Doom and Iron Man	1985	DBR 276
The Amazing Spider-Man: The Big Top Mystery	1985	DBR 281
Fantastic Four: The Island of Danger	1985	DBR 282
The Transformers: The Great Car Rally	1986	DBR 283
The Transformers: The Battle for Cybertron	1986	DBR 284
She-Ra: Princess of Power: The Jewel of Light	1985	DBR 285
She-Ra: Princess of Power: Surprise in Whispering Woods	1985	DBR 286
She-Ra: Princess of Power: The Crystal Castle	1985	DBR 287
Sectaurs: Invasion of Skall Island	1985	DBR 292
Sectaurs: The Lost Hives of Symbion	1985	DBR 293
Sectaurs: Attack of the Venipedes	1985	DBR 294
The Secret of the Sword Part I: The Sword of She-Ra	1985	DBR 297
The Secret of the Sword Part II: The Princess of Power	1985	DBR 298
Pink Panther and Sons in Pinky Saves the Beach Bullies	1985	DBR 300
The Scrabble People in My First Day at School	1985	DBR 301
Richard Scarry's Postman Pig and His Busy Neighbors	1985	DBR 302
Webster: Webster Goes to Washington	1986	DBR 303
Webster: Webster's Great Space Adventure	1986	DBR 304
G.I. Joe: Cobra Strikes!	1986	DBR 305
G.I. Joe: Destro's Doomsday Auction	1986	DBR 307
Care Bears: The Mystery of the Missing Dreams	1986	DBR 308
Care Bears: The Care Bears' Picnic	1986	DBR 309
Care Bears: The Very Best Present in the World	1986	DBR 310
Glo Friends to the Rescue	1987	DBR 313
Glo Friends and the Moonsnuffer	1987	DBR 314
Masters of the Universe: Battle Under Snake Mountain	1986	DBR 319
Masters of the Universe: Prisoner in the Snake Pit	1986	DBR 320
The Popples' Nutcracker Christmas	1986	DBR 321
The Popples' Camp-Out Caper	1986	DBR 322
The Popples and the Paper Route	1986	DBR 323
Popples: The Piano That Wouldn't Play	1986	DBR 330
The Popples Save the Circus	1986	DBR 331
Popples: The Magic Shoe	1986	DBR 332
My Little Pony: The Dance Recital	1986	DBR 333
My Little Pony: Picnic at Paradise Estate	1986	DBR 334
Popples: Pop Goes the Jack-in-the-Box	1987	DBR 339

==== DBC series ====
Title	Year	Pr. #
Garfield: The Knight in Shining Armor	1983	DBC 2200
Garfield in Space	1983	DBC 2201
Bugs Bunny's Space Carrot	1983	DBC 2202
Tweety and Sylvester: Birds of a Feather	1984	DBC 2203
Bugs Bunny Goes to the Dentist	1983	DBC 2204
Pac-Man and the Ghost Diggers	1985	DBC 2205
Ms. Pac-Man's Prize Pupil	1985	DBC 2206
G.I. Joe: The Deadly Satellite	1983	DBC 2207
G.I. Joe: The Captive City	1983	DBC 2208
G.I. Joe: Challenge of the Clones	1983	DBC 2209
Tarzan and his Friends	1984	DBC 2210
Tarzan: King of the Apes	1984	DBC 2211
Tarzan: Lost in the Jungle	1984	DBC 2212
James Bond: Moonraker	1984	DBC 2213
James Bond: The Spy Who Loved Me	1984	DBC 2214
James Bond: Dr. No	1984	DBC 2215
A Child's Introduction to Halley's Comet	1985	DBC 2222
A Child's Introduction to The Return of Halley's Comet	1985	DBC 2223
My Little Pony: The Night Before Christmas	1984	DBC 2224
Schoolhouse Rock!: Three-Ring Government	1984	DBC 2227
Schoolhouse Rock!: The Body Machine	1984	DBC 2228
Schoolhouse Rock!: The Great American Melting Pot	1984	DBC 2229
Firffels: Fird and the Firffel Reunion	1985	DBC 2230
Firffels: Snyder Spider Is Missing!	1985	DBC 2231
Firffels: Hyenant's Magical Red Coat	1985	DBC 2232
The TV Chipmunks	1984	DBC 2233
The Chipmunk Story	1984	DBC 2234
May the Best Chipmunk Win	1984	DBC 2235
The Chipmunks in Santa Harry	1984	DBC 2236
Richard Scarry's On Vacation	1984	DBC 2237
Richard Scarry's In My Town	1984	DBC 2238
Richard Scarry's Learn to Count	1984	DBC 2239
Masters of the Universe: The Thief of Castle Grayskull	1984	DBC 2240
Masters of the Universe: Caverns of Fear	1984	DBC 2241
The Care Bears Help Out	1984	DBC 2242
The Care Bears' Garden	1984	DBC 2243
My Little Pony: Lost in the Clouds	1985	DBC 2244
My Little Pony: The Magic Rainbow	1955	DBC 2245
Knight Rider: K.I.T.T. Vanishes	1984	DBC 2246
Knight Rider: Highway to Danger	1985	DBC 2247
The Transformers: Satellite of Doom	1985	DBC 2248
The Transformers: When Continents Collide	1985	DBC 2249
2001: A Space Odyssey	1985	DBC 2250
2010: The Year We Make Contact	1985	DBC 2251
The Scrabble People in I Love My Home	1985	DBC 2253
The Scrabble People in My First Word Book	1985	DBC 2254
The Scrabble People in A Day on the Farm	1985	DBC 2255
My Little Pony: Glory, the Magic Unicorn	1986	DBC 2256
Knight Rider: Target for Revenge	1985	DBC 2257
The Transformers: Storm of Destruction	1986	DBC 2258
Super Powers: Battle at the Earth's Core	1985	DBC 2259
Super Powers: Darkseid ...of the Moon	1985	DBC 2260
Super Powers: The Battle for Apokolips	1985	DBC 2261
Dune Part 1: Battle of the Known Universe	1984	DBC 2262
Dune Part 2: Attack of the Giant Sandworms	1984	DBC 2263
Smurfing in the Air	1984	DBC 2264
Smurf's Daydream	1984	DBC 2265
The Chipmunks' Cruise	1984	DBC 2268
The Chipmunks in Alvin Goes Wild	1984	DBC 2269
Care Bears: Let's Get to Know the Care Bear Cousins	1985	DBC 2270
Care Bear Cousins in A Day in the Forest of Feelings	1985	DBC 2271
James Bond: A View to a Kill	1985	DBC 2272
Richard Scarry's Please and Thank You Book	1985	DBC 2273
How The Amazing Spider-Man and The Incredible Hulk Began	1985	DBC 2275
The Story of Doctor Doom and Iron Man	1985	DBC 2276
The Amazing Spider-Man: The Big Top Mystery	1985	DBC 2281
Fantastic Four: The Island of Danger	1985	DBC 2282
The Transformers: The Great Car Rally	1986	DBC 2283
The Transformers: The Battle for Cybertron	1986	DBC 2284
She-Ra: Princess of Power: The Jewel of Light	1985	DBC 2285
She-Ra: Princess of Power: Surprise in Whispering Woods	1985	DBC 2286
She-Ra: Princess of Power: The Crystal Castle	1985	DBC 2287
Sectaurs: Invasion of Skall Island	1985	DBC 2292
Sectaurs: The Lost Hives of Symbion	1985	DBC 2293
Sectaurs: Attack of the Venipedes	1985	DBC 2294
The Secret of the Sword Part I: The Sword of She-Ra	1985	DBC 2297
The Secret of the Sword Part II: The Princess of Power	1985	DBC 2298
Pink Panther and Sons in The Rainbow Panthers' Carnival	1985	DBC 2299
Pink Panther and Sons in Pinky Saves the Beach Bullies	1985	DBC 2300
The Scrabble People in My First Day at School	1985	DBC 2301
Richard Scarry's Postman Pig and His Busy Neighbors	1985	DBC 2302
Webster: Webster Goes to Washington	1986	DBC 2303
Webster: Webster's Great Space Adventure	1986	DBC 2304
G.I. Joe: Cobra Strikes!	1986	DBC 2305
G.I. Joe: Destro's Doomsday Auction	1986	DBC 2307
Care Bears: The Mystery of the Missing Dreams	1986	DBC 2308
Care Bears: The Care Bears' Picnic	1986	DBC 2309
Care Bears: The Very Best Present in the World	1986	DBC 2310
Tropical Barbie: Mystery of Mermaid Bay	1987	DBC 2311
Glo Friends to the Rescue	1987	DBC 2313
Glo Friends and the Moonsnuffer	1987	DBC 2314
The Transformers: Jaws of Terror	1986	DBC 2316
The Transformers: Slaves of the Insecticons	1986	DBC 2317
Masters of the Universe: Battle Under Snake Mountain	1986	DBC 2319
Masters of the Universe: Prisoner in the Snake Pit	1986	DBC 2320
The Popples' Nutcracker Christmas	1986	DBC 2321
The Popples' Camp-Out Caper	1986	DBC 2322
The Popples and the Paper Route	1986	DBC 2323
Rambo: The Rescue	1987	DBC 2324
Rambo: The Angel of Destruction	1987	DBC 2325
Galaxy Rangers: The New Frontier	1987	DBC 2326
Galaxy Rangers: Tortuna, the Outlaw Planet	1987	DBC 2327
Popples: The Piano That Wouldn't Play	1986	DBC 2330
The Popples Save the Circus	1986	DBC 2331
Popples: The Magic Shoe	1986	DBC 2332
My Little Pony: The Dance Recital	1986	DBC 2333
My Little Pony: Picnic at Paradise Estate	1986	DBC 2334
Popples: The WPOP Poprock Radio Show	1987	DBC 2336
Barbie: Astronaut Barbie	1987	DBC 2337
Popples: Pop Goes the Jack-in-the-Box	1987	DBC 2339
She-Ra: Princess of Power: Storm Over Etheria	1987	DBC 2340
She-Ra: Princess of Power: The Revenge of Catra	1987	DBC 2341
Bible Stories for Children: Moses and the Plagues on Egypt	1987	DBC 2342
Bible Stories for Children: Joseph and His Brothers	1987	DBC 2343
Bible Stories for Children: The Story of Daniel	1987	DBC 2347
Care Bears: Too Much of a Good Thing	1987	DBC 2348

=== Just Imagine Play Kits ===
Album	Year	Pr. #
Care Bears	1984	0008
Strawberry Shortcake	1984	0018
Barbie	1984	0028
Masters of the Universe	1984	0038
The Chipmunks	1984	0048
Dungeons & Dragons	1984	0058

=== Tape Me Along Cassettes ===
Album	Year	Pr. #
Masters of the Universe Vol. 1: He-Man and Battle Cat/The Revenge of Skeletor	1986	TMA-8400
Masters of the Universe Vol. 2: Masters of the Universe	1986	TMA-8401
Popples Vol. 1: The Popples Save the Circus	1986	TMA-8410
Popples Vol. 2: The Piano That Wouldn't Play	1986	TMA-8411
She-Ra: Princess of Power Vol. 1: The Jewel of Light	1986	TMA-8430
The Transformers Vol. 1: When Continents Collide	1986	TMA-8440
My Little Pony Vol. 1: Glory, the Magic Unicorn	1986	TMA-8450
G.I. Joe Vol. 1: The Deadly Satellite/Challenge of the Clones	1987	TMA-8465

== Kid Vid ==
=== List of Kid Vid titles ===
Title	Year	Pr. #
Bibles Stories for Children: Miriam and Baby Moses	1987	CBV 5901
Bibles Stories for Children: Joseph and Mary	1987	CBV 5903
Children's Musical Theatre: Mother Goose Musical Rhymes	1987	CMU 6901
Children's Musical Theatre: Songs of Childhood	1987	CMU 6903
Children's Musical Theatre: Let's Make Music	1987	CMU 6905
Children's Musical Theatre: My Favorite Musical Stories — Peter And The Wolf/The Sorcerer's Apprentice	1987	CMU 6906
See & Sing: Songs of America	1985	KMV 3001
See & Sing: Silly Songs	1985	KMV 3003
See & Sing: Rainy Day Finger Play & Fun Songs	1985	KMV 3004
See & Sing: All-Time Favorites	1985	KMV 3005
See & Sing: Christmas Favorites	1985	KMV 3007
It's O.K. to Say No!	1985	KOK 7001
It's O.K. to Say No to Drugs!	1985	KOK 7010
See & Learn: Letters, Sounds & Words	1985	KSL 9001
See & Learn: Numbers... What They Mean	1985	KSL 9002
See & Learn: Colors... Green Grass & Blue Sky	1985	KSL 9003
See & Learn: Shapes... Round, Square... In-Between	1985	KSL 9004
See & Learn: Learn to Spell with the Scrabble People: My First Word Book/I Love My Home	1985	KSL 9005
See & Learn: A Child's Introduction to Telling Time	1986	KSL 9009
See & Learn: A Child's Introduction to Musical Instruments	1986	KSL 9010
See & Read: Rainbow Brite: The Risky Rescue/The Sprite Emergency	1985	KVB 8001
See & Read: Super Powers: Battle at the Earth's Core	1985	KVB 8002
See & Read: The Transformers: Satellite of Doom/When Continents Collide	1985	KVB 8003
See & Read: Shirt Tales: The Park Bench Caper/The Ghosts of Hill House	1985	KVB 8005
See & Read: The Flintstones: Fred & Barney Get in Shape/Fred, The Junk Collector	1985	KVB 8006
See & Read: Super Powers: Darkseid... of the Moon!	1986	KVB 8008
See & Read: Sectaurs: Invasion of Skall Island/Attack of the Venipedes	1986	KVB 8011
See & Read: The Transformers: Jaws of Terror/Slaves of the Insecticons	1986	KVB 8018
Smurf Read-Along Video: Smurfing in the Air/Smurf's Daydream	1985	KVB 8009
G.I. Joe: Cobra Strikes!/Destro's Doomsday Auction	1986	KVB 8016
Rainbow Brite: Twink's Surprise/Gloom Over Rainbow Land	1986	KVB 8017

== See also ==
- Book-and-record set
- List of record labels
- Golden Records
- Peter Pan Records
