= Fanny E. Lacy =

British writer and activist (c. 1786–1869)

The Honourable Fanny E. Lacy
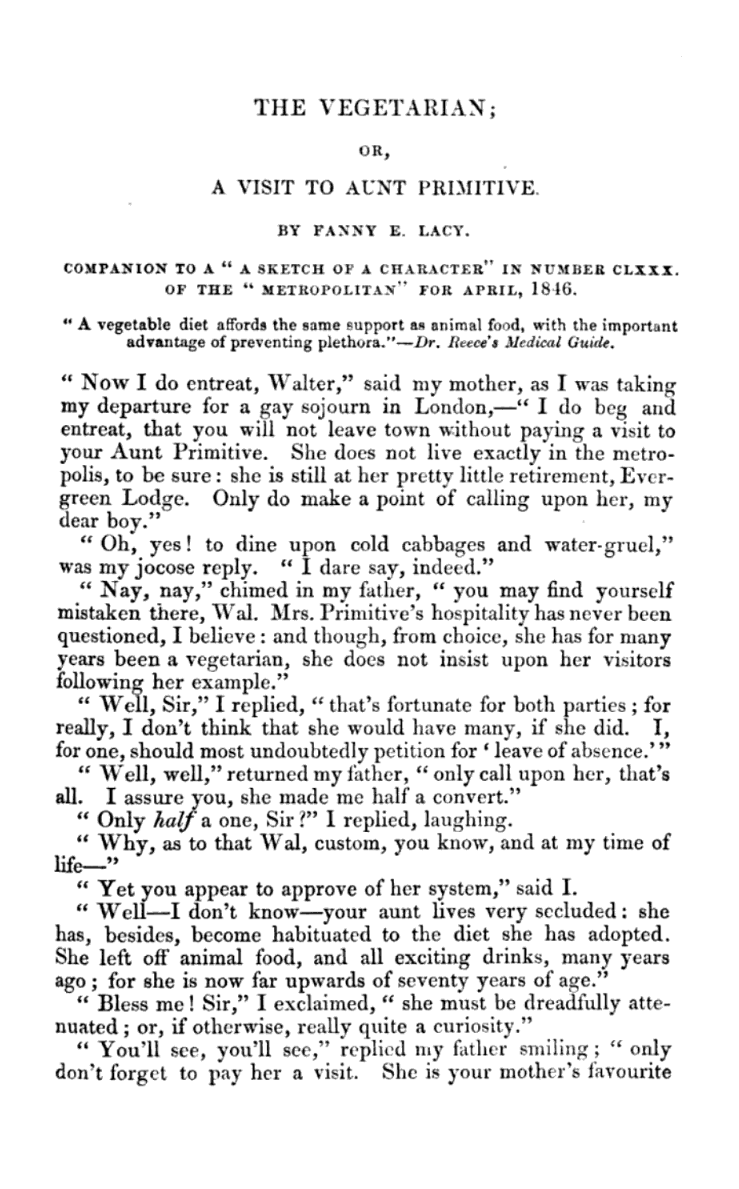
- First page of "The Vegetarian; or, a Visit to Aunt Primitive"
- Born: Fanny Elizabeth Lacy c. 1786
- Died: 1869 (aged 83); Fulham, London, England
- Resting place: Brompton Cemetery
- Occupations: Writer; poet; composer; activist
- Writing career
- Pen name: Fanny Eliza Lacy
- Language: English
- Years active: 1832–1859
- Genres: Fiction; poetry; children's literature; songs
- Notable work: "The Vegetarian; or, a Visit to Aunt Primitive" (1847)

Fanny Elizabeth Lacy (c. 1786–1869), who wrote under the name Fanny Eliza Lacy, was a British writer, poet, composer, and advocate of vegetarianism and women's rights. She was active in reform circles in and around London and became involved in the early vegetarian movement in the 1830s and 1840s. Her fiction and poetry appeared in 19th-century periodicals including The Mirror of Literature, Amusement, and Instruction, the Mirror Monthly Magazine and the Metropolitan Magazine. She also wrote and composed songs, including nursery-rhyme settings published in Boston.

Lacy adopted a vegetarian diet in 1832 and was associated with the Concordium community at Alcott House. Her short story "The Vegetarian; or, a Visit to Aunt Primitive" (1847), written as a companion piece to "A Sketch of Character", presents vegetarianism as a health practice and as a basis for gradual social reform. Scholars have discussed the story in relation to 19th-century vegetarianism, animal welfare and women's rights.

== Biography ==
=== Early life ===
Fanny Elizabeth Lacy was born around 1786 into an aristocratic family. According to historian James Gregory, she expressed discomfort with eating meat from an early age.

=== Activism and reform work ===
Lacy has been described by Dan Abitz as an early vegetarian feminist because of the links between her advocacy for animals and for women. According to Gregory, she adopted a vegetarian diet in 1832 and later attended meetings of the early London vegetarian movement.

Her connections with other reformers are shown in a letter from Goodwyn Barmby to Joshua Jacob and Abigail Beale of the White Quakers. Barmby reported staying with Lacy at Garden Cottage in Walham Green after distributing tracts and books, and quoted her description of herself as "a friend to progress, and one much desirous of understanding your work."

In 1847, Lacy was recorded as living in Hounslow in a list of correspondents in the published report of the Vegetarian Society's adjourned conference at Ramsgate. Her name appeared among people who sent letters supporting the society's aims but were unable to attend in person.

=== Association with the Concordium ===
Lacy contributed poetry to periodicals associated with the Concordium, a social reform community based at Alcott House. One of her poems, "The Star and the Spring Flower", appeared in the January 1844 issue of the New Age. In correspondence with William Horsell, editor of the Truth-Tester, she mentioned a vegetarian acquaintance named Marshall, who adopted the diet after visiting Alcott House. Her work also appeared in the Truth-Tester, including an 1848 poem titled "Invitation to the Physiological Festival", which referred to the "Physiological Conference" held at Alcott House. The conference has been described as an early step in the formation of the Vegetarian Society.

=== "The Vegetarian; or, a Visit to Aunt Primitive" ===
In April 1847, Lacy published "The Vegetarian; or, a Visit to Aunt Primitive" in the Metropolitan Magazine. It was intended as a companion piece to her earlier story "A Sketch of Character", which had appeared in the same periodical the previous year. The story may have been published through the influence of editor Edward Bulwer-Lytton, who was known as a supporter of vegetarianism. It includes a quotation from Dr. Reece's Medical Guide stating that "a vegetable diet affords the same support as animal food, with the important advantage of preventing plethora."

Although the story was written by a woman, the narrative centres on male characters who adopt vegetarianism and experience improved health. Suzanne Samples notes that, in the Victorian period, dietary restraint was often associated with women, and that male vegetarians could be perceived as departing from prevailing gender expectations. She reads Lacy's story as responding to these views by presenting vegetarianism as compatible with male vitality and well-being.

The story also presents vegetarianism as an alternative to urban and industrial life. The protagonist's aunt, portrayed as a committed vegetarian, lives in a rural setting and describes "flesh-foods" as "strange unnatural compounds". She envisages a future in which vegetarianism supports a pastoral and morally renewed society. According to Rebecca Nesvet, the aunt argues that if a vegetarian diet were universally adopted it would reconstitute society, with moral and physical benefits, and insists that such change should be gradual and nonviolent.

=== Songwriting ===
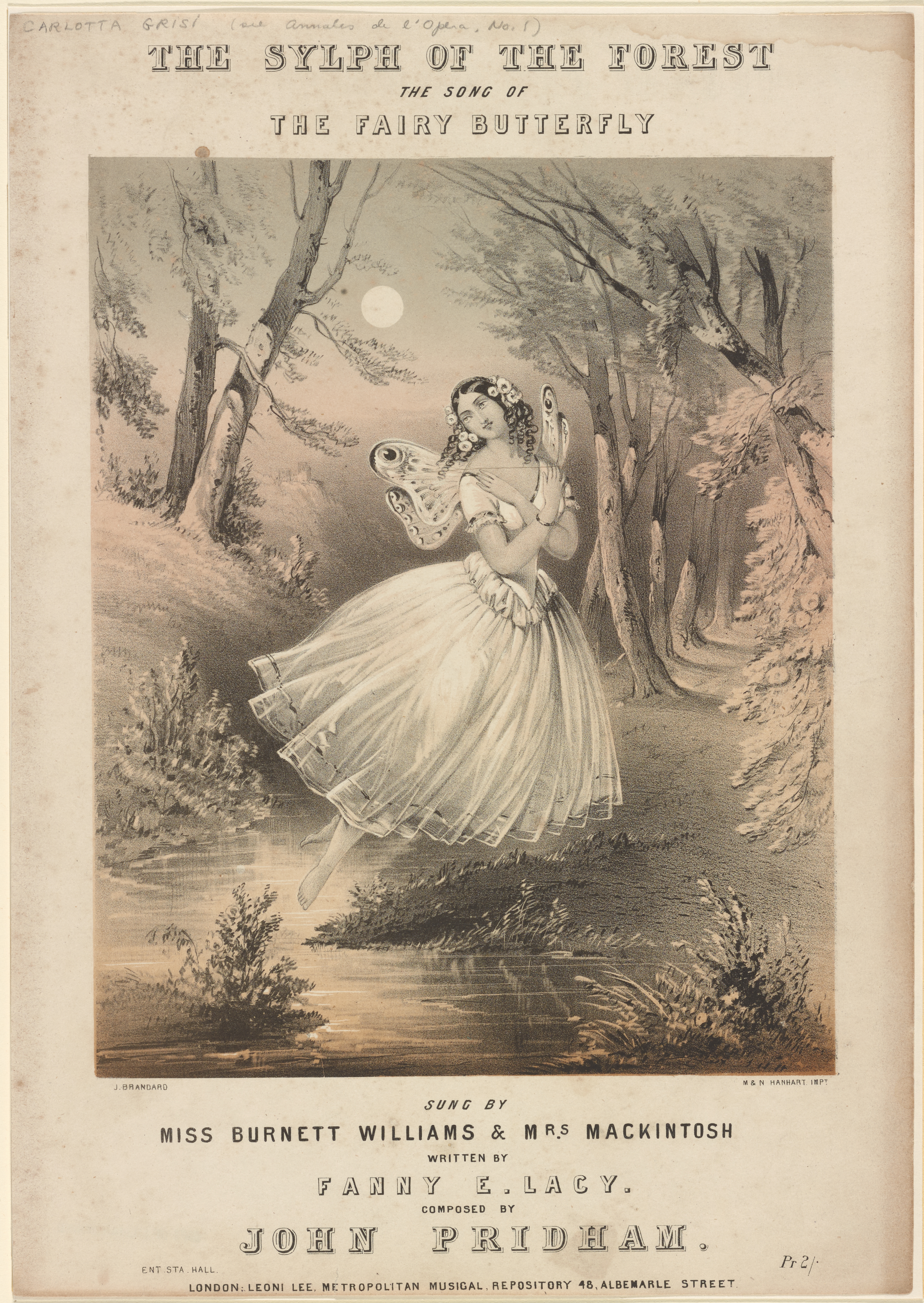
Cover of the sheet music for "The Sylph of the Forest", with lyrics by Lacy

Lacy wrote and composed songs, including children's pieces issued as sheet music in the United States. Her booklet Juvenile Songs: Jack and Jill, published by Oliver Ditson in Boston, sets the nursery rhyme "Jack and Jill" for piano and voice. She also composed a separate setting of "Little Jack Horner", likewise published by Ditson. Another song, "The World of Flowers", is also attributed to her.

Lacy also wrote texts set by other composers in pieces including "Come Friends and Neighbours", "Lillian", "The Fruit Gatherers' Song", "The World of Flowers" and "The Sylph of the Forest: The Song of the Fairy Butterfly".

=== Other writing ===
Lacy contributed regularly to 19th-century periodicals, especially The Mirror of Literature, Amusement, and Instruction and the Mirror Monthly Magazine. Her fiction included tales such as "The True History of the Celebrated Blue Beard", "The Story of Little Red Riding-Hood", "Cinderella; or, The Little Glass Slipper", "The Disagreeable Lodger", "Jeremy Jollyboy's Pantomime; or, An Old Bachelor's Garret-Window", and "The Vision of the Snow-Storm; A Tale for a Winter Night". She also wrote historical and exotic stories including "Judith and Holofernes", "The Nabob's Arrival" and "The Serpent-Charmer of Cashmere: A Tale of Hindoostan". Her poetry appeared both as individual pieces, such as "The Fruit Gatherers", "Let Us Pray" and "A Wish for the New Year", and in recurring series titled "Pencillings of Poesy" and "Lays from Shakespeare".

In the 1850s, Lacy published several volumes of fiction and poetry. Her collection The Visitor in Grey, and Other Tales was dedicated, with permission, to Lord Shaftesbury. One of her poems appeared in the Ragged School Magazine, a periodical associated with educational reform. Merry Sparks for a Winter Hearth was dedicated to her literary mentor Albert Smith and was promoted in newspaper advertisements. Labyrinth and the Path: A Sacred Poem was dedicated to the Reverend John Cumming and included Hindu themes, together with a poem about a character named Basa who is socially ostracised after converting to Christianity.

=== Death ===
Lacy died in 1869, aged 83, at 12 Lansdowne Villas in Fulham, London. She was buried in Brompton Cemetery on 11 December.

== Legacy ==
Lacy is listed in John Foster Kirk's bibliographical work A Supplement to Allibone's Critical Dictionary of English Literature and British and American Authors. She also appears in David James O'Donoghue's 1912 reference work The Poets of Ireland: A Biographical Dictionary of Irish Writers of English Verse.

Literary historians have identified Lacy among 19th-century British writers, including James Duncan and Sarah Clubb, who incorporated vegetarian themes into fiction between the 1840s and 1870s. Gregory writes that this material was limited in extent and received little contemporary attention, but formed part of writing linked to the vegetarian movement.

Lacy has also been discussed in scholarship on the historical connections between vegetarianism, animal welfare and women's rights. Her short story "The Vegetarian; or, a Visit to Aunt Primitive" has been described as an early example of literature expressing feminist-vegetarian ideas. It has been considered alongside the work of Mary Shelley, Martha Brotherton and Beatrice Webb as part of a group of Victorian women writers who used vegetarianism to imagine utopian social change.

In later surveys of vegetarianism's literary and cultural reach, Lacy is mentioned with Punch, Charles Walter Forward, Edward Carpenter and Henry S. Salt as one of several figures whose writings presented vegetarianism to Victorian readers. Samples notes that Lacy's work has received limited detailed study.

== Selected publications ==
- Sheridan, Louisa Henrietta, ed. (1834). "A Trifling Commission". The Comic Offering, Or, Ladies' Melange of Literary Mirth. London: Smith, Elder and Company. pp. 308–317.
- "A Sketch of Character". Metropolitan Magazine. No. 180. April 1846.
- "The Vegetarian; or, a Visit to Aunt Primitive" (PDF). Metropolitan Magazine. April 1847.
- "Invitation to the Physiological Festival". Truth-Tester. Vol. 1. 1847. p. 20.
- The Visitor in Grey, and Other Tales. London: W. Tweedie. 1853.
- Merry Sparks for a Winter Hearth. London: Hardwicke. 1855.
- The Labyrinth and the Path: A Sacred Poem. Chelsea: W. Tweedie. 1856.
- A Very Old Story: Dedicated to an Enlightened Nation. London: W. Tweedie. 1857.
- Centenary Tribute to Robert Burns. London: W. Tweedie. 1859.

== See also ==
- History of vegetarianism
- Vegetarianism in the Victorian era
- Women and vegetarianism and veganism advocacy
- Women in the Victorian era
