= Duncan James (disambiguation) =

Duncan James (born 1978) is a British singer and member of the band Blue.

Duncan James may also refer to:

- Duncan James (Australian singer) (fl. 2003–04), Australian singer
- Duncan Airlie James (born 1961), kickboxer

== See also ==
- James Duncan (disambiguation)
