= Joseph Gould (Canadian cultural figure) =

Joseph Gould (28 January 1833 in Penn Yan, New York – 27 March 1913 in Montreal, Quebec) was an American-born Canadian businessman, choir director, editor and composer.

== Life and work ==
Gould moved with his family to Montreal as a teenager in 1848. About 1864, in association with Freedom Hill, he took over a former piano and music business to create the firm of Gould & Hill, and afterwards maintained an organ and piano warehouse under his own name until 1881. He also played a leading part in the city's musical life, having founded the Mendelssohn Choir of Montreal in 1864. He managed this for the next thirty years and conducted there a repertoire largely of part songs and miscellaneous pieces. For several years he was also the vice-president of the Montreal Philharmonic Society and in 1892 he declined an invitation by some of Montreal's leading musicians to head a new conservatory.

In addition Gould founded the semi-monthly Arcadia, a Journal devoted exclusively to Music, Art, and Literature, between May 1892 – March 1893, which was notable at this period for its cosmopolitan coverage. And in a personal capacity he helped bring the first operas of Richard Wagner to Montreal.

As a composer Gould wrote several vocal pieces under the pseudonym Sydney Percival. Three choral works, "Out of the Depths", "Ave Verum" and "Panis Angelicus", have been reprinted by the Canadian Museum of History; other manuscripts are held at the National Library of Canada and at McGill University. His setting of the words of "Laus Deo" by Mary Baker Eddy was sung at the dedication of The First Church of Christ, Scientist in 1895. Some of his part-songs were based on nursery rhymes, of which the score for "Little Tommy Tucker" is held at the Library of Congress and two others, "Jack and Jill" and "Georgie Porgie", were recorded with other Victorian material in 2012.

== Bibliography ==
"Joseph Gould" in The Canadian Encyclopedia
