= Jack and Jill =

English nursery rhyme

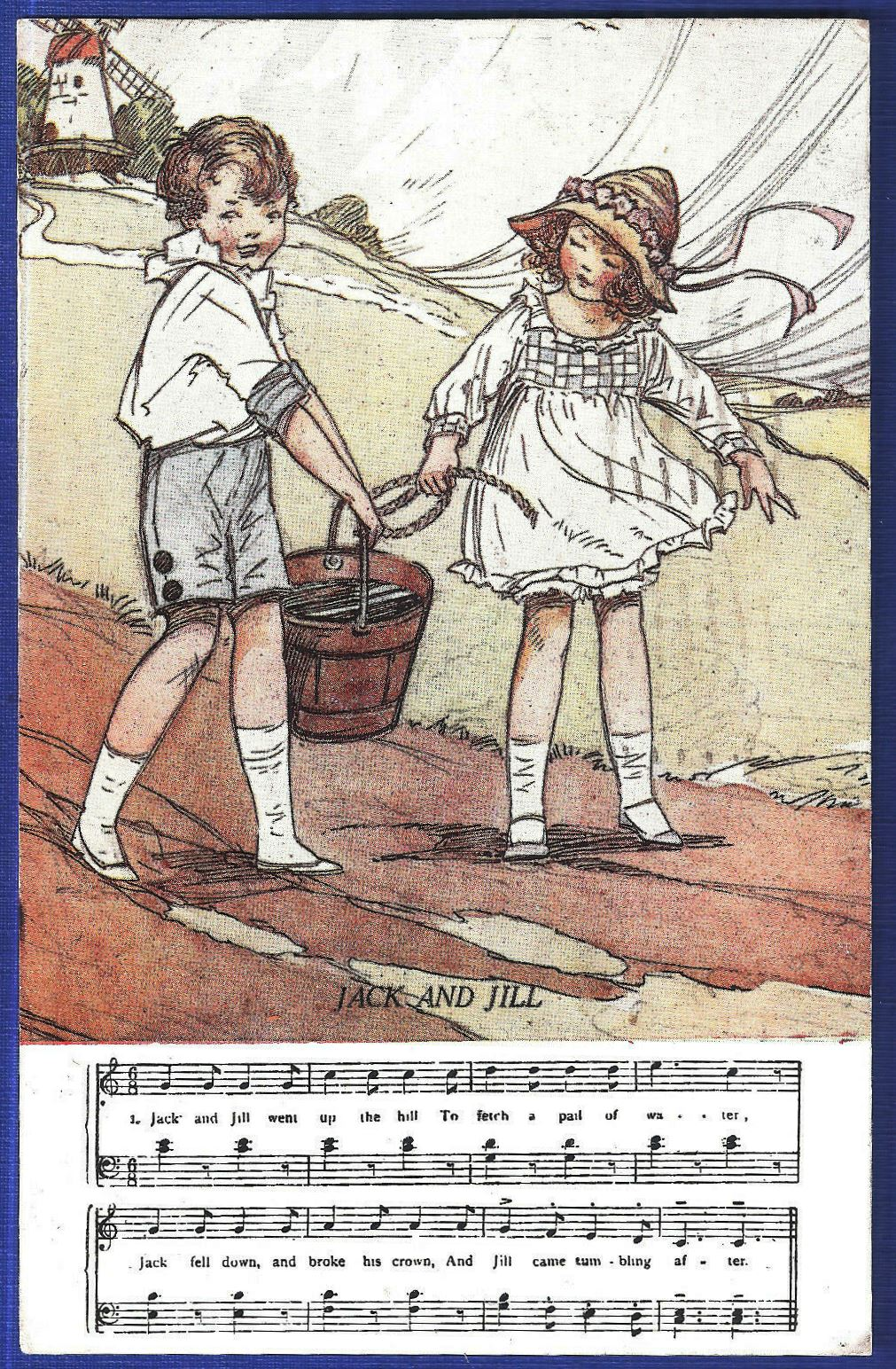
A postcard of the rhyme using Dorothy M. Wheeler's 1916 illustration

"Jack and Jill" (sometimes "Jack and Gill", particularly in earlier versions) is a traditional English nursery rhyme. The Roud Folk Song Index classifies the commonest tune and its variations as number 10266, although it has been set to several others. The original rhyme dates back to the 18th century and different numbers of verses were later added, each with variations in the wording. Throughout the 19th century new versions of the story were written featuring different incidents. A number of theories continue to be advanced to explain the rhyme's historical origin.

== Text ==
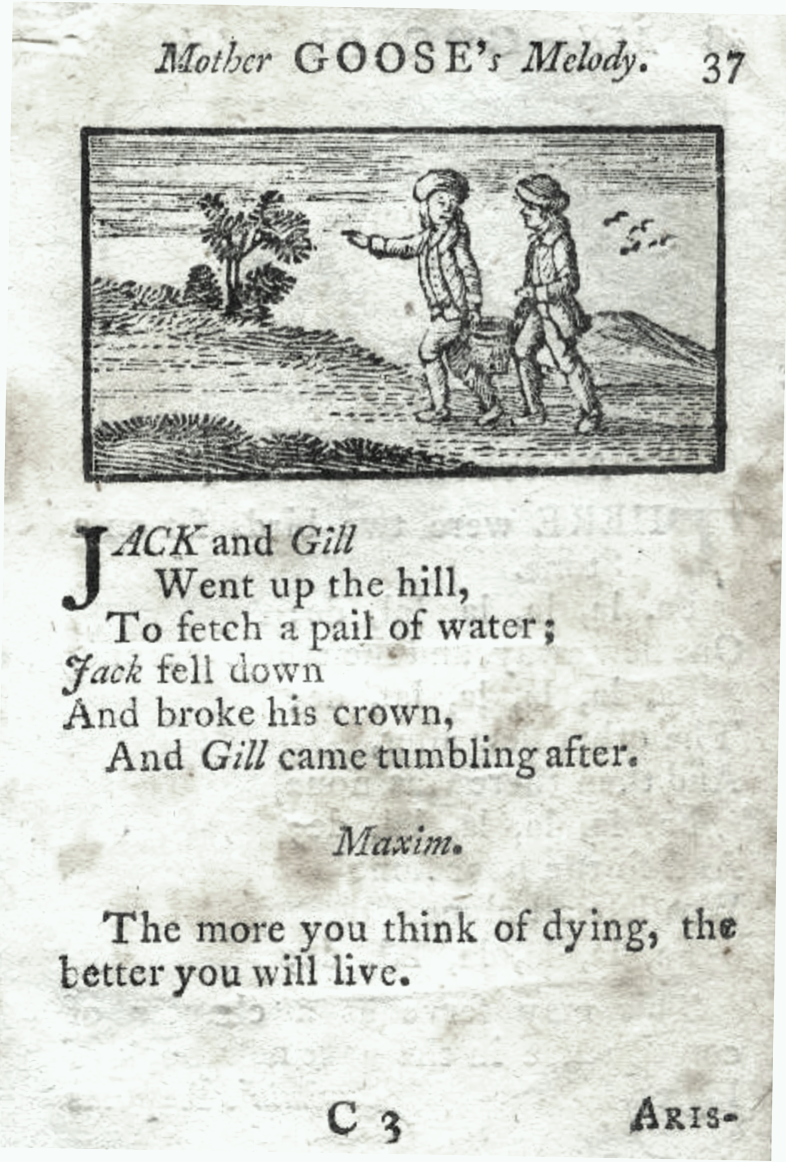
From Mother Goose's Melody (1791 edition)

The earliest version of the rhyme was in a reprint of John Newbery's Mother Goose's Melody, thought to have been first published in London around 1765. The rhyming of "water" with "after" was taken by Iona and Peter Opie to suggest that the first verse might date from the 17th century. Jill was originally spelled Gill in the earliest version of the rhyme and the accompanying woodcut showed two boys at the foot of the hill.

Jack and Gill went up the hill
To fetch a pail of water;
Jack fell down and broke his crown
And Gill came tumbling after.

Later the spelling was changed to Jill and more verses were added to carry the story further, of which the commonest are:

Up Jack got and home did trot,
As fast as he could caper;
Went to bed to mend his head
With vinegar and brown paper.

Jill came in and she did grin
To see his paper plaster;
Mother, vex’d, did whip her next
For causing Jack's disaster.

As presented over the following century, the rhyming scheme of the six-line stanzas is AABCCB and they are trochaic in rhythm. Alternatively, when given the form of internally rhymed quatrains, this would be an example of the ballad form commonly used for nursery rhymes.

The phrase "Jack and Jill" existed earlier in England to indicate a boy and girl as a generic pair. It is so used, for example, in the proverb "Every Jack (shall/must) have his Jill", to which there are references in two plays by William Shakespeare dating from the 1590s. The compress of vinegar and brown paper to which Jack resorted after his fall was a common home cure used to heal bruises.

== New versions ==
Though approximately the words above are what have survived of the nursery rhyme to the present, their sense is preserved at the start of a 15-stanza chapbook, Jack & Jill and Old Dame Gill, published in 1806. The work dates from the period when children's literature was beginning to shift from instruction to fun in the wake of the success of Old Mother Hubbard and kindred works. This change of emphasis was signalled by the book's coloured illustrations and introductory epigraph: "Read it who will, They’ll laugh their fill". In this version the trio of Jack, Jill, and their mother Dame Gill experience further mishaps involving the dog Ball, an attack from a goat, falls from a see-saw, a swing and a pig, followed by a parental whipping for getting dirty. Many pirated editions of the work followed from both London and provincial presses, accompanied by black and white as well as coloured woodcuts. Sometimes there were several different editions from the same press, such as, for example, the Banbury editions of John Golby Rusher (1784–1877) between 1835 and 1845. The wording also varied in these, and there were multiplications of the creatures involved in the adventures of the three protagonists – a donkey, a reindeer, a bull, a goose and a camel.

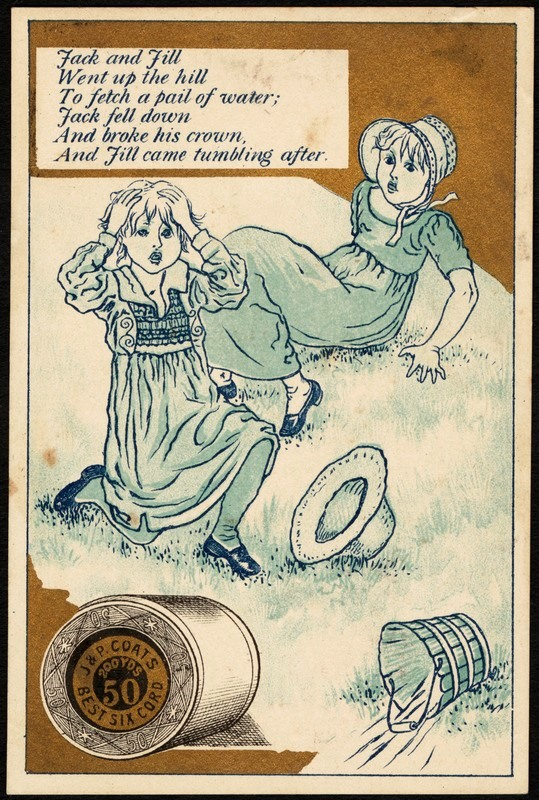
An advertising card based on Kate Greenaway's 1881 illustration of the rhyme

As the decades advanced there were changes in form as well as wording. An 1840s edition from Otley, titled The adventures of Jack & Jill and old Dame Jill, was written in longer and more circumstantial quatrains of between ten and twelve syllables, rhymed AABB. Among other changes in the poem, Jack's injuries are treated, not with vinegar and brown paper, but "spread all over with sugar and rum".

There were also radical changes in the telling of the story in America. Among the Juvenile Songs rewritten and set to music by Fanny E. Lacy (Boston 1852) was a six-stanza version of Jack and Jill. Having related their climb and fall from the hill, the rest of the poem is devoted to a warning against social climbing: "By this we see that folks should be/ Contented with their station,/ And never try to look so high/ Above their situation." There is a similar tendency to moral instruction in the three "chapters" of Jack and Jill, for old and young by Lawrence Augustus Gobright (1816–1879), published in Philadelphia in 1873. There the pair have grown up to be a devoted and industrious married couple; the fall is circumstantially explained and the cure afterwards drawn out over many, many quatrains. In the introduction to his work, Gobright makes the claim that the two-stanza version of the original nursery rhyme was, in earlier editions, followed by two more:

Little Jane ran up the lane
To hang her clothes a-drying;
She called for Nell to ring the bell,
For Jack and Jill were dying.
Nimble Dick ran up so quick,
He tumbled over a timber,
And bent his bow to shoot a crow,
And killed a cat in the window.

No such verses are found in English editions, although they do appear in a later American edition of Mother Goose's nursery rhymes, tales and jingles (New York 1902).

Yet another American variation on the story appeared in the Saint Nicholas Magazine. This was Margaret Johnson's "A New Jack and Jill", in which the brother and sister constantly return with an empty bucket because they have not noticed that there is a hole in it. Clifton Bingham (1859–1913) followed it with "The New Jack and Jill", which appeared in the children's album Fun and Frolic (London and New York, 1900), illustrated by Louis Wain. Here there is a return to the six-line stanza form:

Jack and Jill
Went up the hill
To fetch a pail of milk, oh!
Jack was drest
In his Sunday best,
And Jill in her gown of silk, oh!

But the cow objects and chases them down again. The exclamatory style used in all three stanzas replicates that used only in the sixth stanza of the popular Jack and Jill and Old Dame Gill.

== Musical settings ==
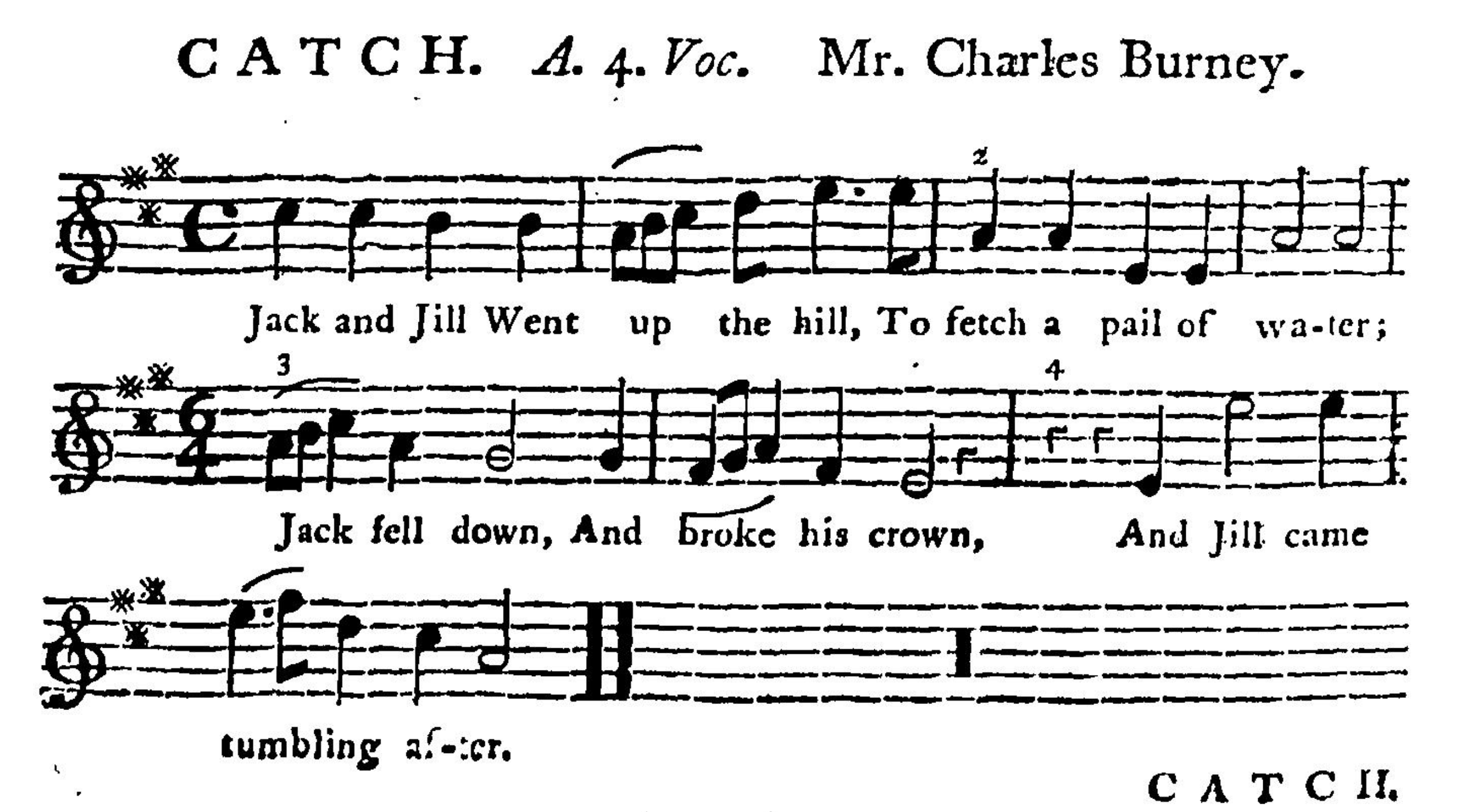
Musical setting by Charles Burney (1777)

A musical arrangement of the rhyme as a catch by Charles Burney was published in 1777, at a date earlier than any still existing copy of Mother Goose's Melody. But the melody commonly associated with the rhyme was first recorded with the three stanza version by the composer and nursery lore collector James William Elliott in his National Nursery Rhymes and Nursery Songs (1870), which was published in America as Mother Goose Set to Music the following year. And in 1877 the single-stanza version illustrated by Walter Crane appeared in The Baby's Opera (London 1877), which described itself as "a book of old rhymes in new dresses, the music by the earliest masters".

The Victorian composer Alfred James Caldicott, who distinguished himself by setting several nursery rhymes as ingenious part songs, adapted "Jack and Jill" as one in 1878. These works were described by the Dictionary of National Biography as a "humorous admixture of childish words and very complicated music…with full use of contrast and the opportunities afforded by individual words". Among American adaptations of his work for female voices, there were settings by E. M. Bowman (New York, 1883) and Charles R. Ford (Boston, 1885). In Canada, Spencer Percival was responsible for a part-song of his own for four voices, first performed in 1882.

Sigmund Spaeth was eventually to have fun with the rhyme by adapting it to a number of bygone musical styles as The musical adventures of Jack & Jill in Words & Music: A Book of Burlesques, (Simon and Schuster, 1926). These included a Handel aria, Italian operatic and Wagnerian versions. Later on the English composer Geoffrey Hartley (1906–1992) set the original as a chamber piece for horn and two bassoons, or for wind trio (1975), and later reset it as a bassoon trio.

== Interpretations ==
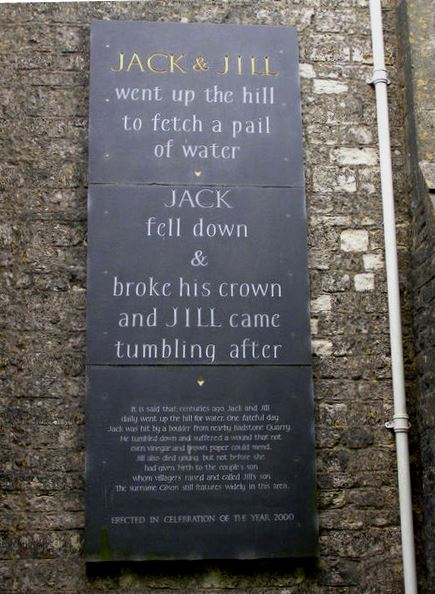
The plaque erected in 2000 at Kilmersdon to commemorate the village's association with the rhyme

There are several theories concerning the origin of the rhyme. Most such explanations postdate the first publication of the rhyme and have no corroborating evidence. S. Baring-Gould suggested that the rhyme is related to a story in the 13th-century Icelandic Gylfaginning in which the brother and sister Hjuki and Bil were stolen by the Moon while drawing water from a well, to be seen there to this day.

Other suggestions rooted in history include a reference to the executions of Richard Empson and Edmund Dudley in 1510, or to a marriage negotiation conducted by Thomas Wolsey in 1514. Alternatively it has been taken to satirise an attempt by King Charles I of England to raise extra revenue by ordering that the volume of a jack (1/8 pint) be reduced, while the tax remained the same. In consequence of this, the gill (1/4 pint) "came tumbling after".

There is also a belief in Somerset that the rhyme records events in the village of Kilmersdon when a local girl became pregnant; the putative father is said to have died from a rockfall and the woman afterwards died in childbirth. The local surname of Gilson is therefore taken to derive from Gill's son.

A more prosaic origin of the rhyme is suggested by historian Edward A. Martin, who notes that pails of water may readily have been collected from dew ponds, which were located on the tops of hills.

== See also ==
- List of nursery rhymes
