= Georgie Porgie =

Popular English language nursery rhyme

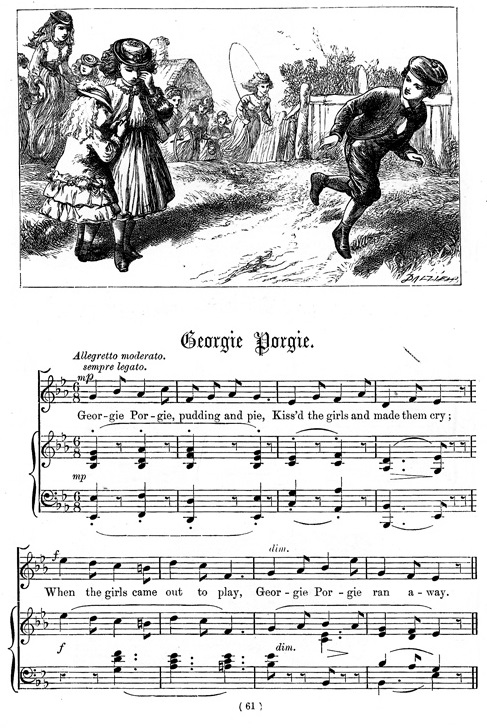
A Victorian musical setting and illustration of the rhyme

"Georgie Porgie" is a popular English language nursery rhyme. It has the Roud Folk Song Index number 19532.

== Origins and variations ==
Originally the lyrics were:

Georgie Porgie, pudding and pie,
Kissed the girls and made them cry,
When the girls came out to play,
Georgie Porgie ran away.

These appeared in The Kentish Coronal (1841), where the rhyme was described as an "old ballad" with the name spelled "Georgy Peorgy". That version persisted through most of the 19th century and was later illustrated by Kate Greenaway in 1881. It was also quoted by Rudyard Kipling in the story named after it, published in 1891.

James Halliwell-Phillipps did not record the words in his first collection of The Nursery Rhymes of England, but in the fifth edition of 1853 he included a variant:

Rowley Powley, pumpkin pie,
Kissed the girls and made them cry;
When the girls begin to cry,
Rowley Powley runs away.

And a Cheshire dialect version was quoted in 1887 with the variant "picklety pie" in place of Halliwell's "pumpkin pie".

By 1884 a version had appeared in which the third line read "When the boys came out to play", and it was this reading which Iona and Peter Opie chose to perpetuate in their day in The Oxford Dictionary of Nursery Rhymes (1951). They also mentioned there various unsubstantiated conjectures that link the character Georgie Porgie to British historical figures, including King George I and George Villiers, 1st Duke of Buckingham, claims that have been copied in other works of reference to this day.

Among children the verse has been used as a rhyming taunt for boys called George, or else of fat boys. It is also used to harass a boy who is considered not sufficiently manly, either because he is thought to fancy a girl, or (with a switch of sexes in line two) who is accused of being homosexually inclined. It can also be used to tease a girl who fancies a boy, where, with other appropriate changes, she is addressed as "Rosie Posie".

== Musical versions ==
"Georgie Porgie" (1924), by Billy Mayerl and Gerald "Gee" Paul
Billy Mayerl and Gerald "Gee" Paul's 1924 arrangement of "Georgie Porgie"

The rhyme was included in National Nursery Rhymes (London, 1870), a volume illustrated by George Dalziel and Edward Dalziel, where the words were set to music by James William Elliott. And in 1885 they were set as a part song by the Canadian composer Joseph Gould under his musical pseudonym, Spencer Percival.

In 1924, Billy Mayerl and Gerald "Gee" Paul adapted the first two lines into the chorus of a novelty foxtrot which was featured in the revue The Punch Bowl by Norman O'Neill and subsequently covered by various jazz bands.

The 1978 song "Georgy Porgy" by Toto also features the first two lines of the rhyme.
