= Little Tommy Tucker =

Nursery rhyme

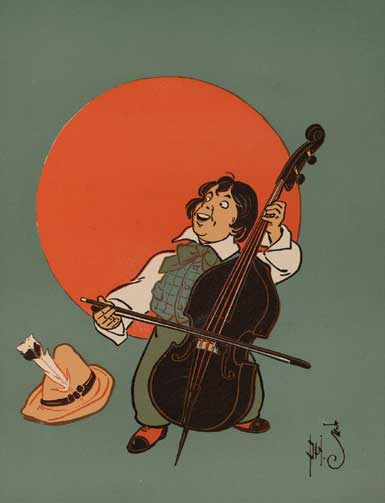
- 1901 illustration by William Wallace Denslow

Nursery rhyme
- Published: c. 1744
- Songwriter: Unknown

"Little Tommy Tucker" is an English language nursery rhyme. It has a Roud Folk Song Index number of 19618.

== Lyrics ==
Common modern versions include:

Little Tommy Tucker

Sings for his supper.

What shall we give him?

White bread and butter.

How shall he cut it

Without a knife?

How will he be married

Without a wife?

== Origins ==
According to Peter and Iona Opie, the earliest version of this rhyme appeared in Tommy Thumb's Pretty Song Book (c. 1744), which recorded only the first four lines. The full version was included in Mother Goose's Melody (c. 1765).

To 'sing for one's supper' was a proverbial phrase by the seventeenth century. Early in that century, too, possible evidence of the rhyme's prior existence is suggested by the appearance of the line "Tom would eat meat but wants a knife" in An excellent new Medley (c. 1620), a composite work in which each line incorporates a reference to a contemporary song. Another possible reference occurs in Robert Herrick's epigram “Upon Tuck” that appears in Hesperides (1648):

At post and pair, or slam, Tom Tuck would play
This Christmas, but his want wherewith says nay.

The reference in the first line here is to stakes or forfeits in contemporary games of cards.

Once the rhyme entered the nursery repertoire it was frequently included in collections of such lore and tunes were then fitted to it. The Library of Congress preserves an 1885 round for four voices by the Canadian Sydney Percival (musical pseudonym of Joseph Gould) in which Tommy is "singing for his supper. What shall he have but white bread and butter? How shall he cut it without any knife, How shall he marry without any wife?" In 1924 the English composer Peter Warlock set it as the fifth piece in his Candlelight: a cycle of nursery jingles. The rhyme was also included in Carl Orff and Gunild Keetman’s children's musical education project, Schulwek (1950).
