= Jim Duncan (footballer) =

English footballer (born 1938)

Personal information
- Full name: James Robert Duncan
- Date of birth: 2 April 1938 (age 88)
- Place of birth: Hull, England
- Position: Inside forward

Senior career*
Years	Team	Apps	(Gls)
1955–1960	Hull City	26	(3)
1960–1961	Bradford City	18	(5)
- Bridlington Town
Total		44	(8)
- * Club domestic league appearances and goals

James Robert Duncan (born 2 April 1938) is an English former professional footballer who played as an inside forward.

== Career ==
Born in Hull, Duncan played for Hull City, Bradford City and Bridlington Town.
