= James Duncan (missionary) =

Scotish minister (1813–1907)

James Duncan (1 February 1813 – 30 December 1907) was a New Zealand missionary and Presbyterian minister.

He was born in Airdrie, Lanarkshire, Scotland on 1 February, 1813. He left Scotland in 1843 and travelled to Manawatu, becoming the first Presbyterian missionary to the Maori people.

He served in Wanganui and Foxton, and went on to become Moderator of the Presbyterian Church of New Zealand.
