= James William Elliott =

James William Elliott (1833–1915), usually cited as J. W. Elliott, was an English collector of nursery rhymes. Together with engravers George and Edward Dalziel, he published Mother Goose's Nursery Rhymes and Nursery Songs Set to Music in the 1870s.

He is cited as the author of the hymn tune "Church Triumphant" which is used to sing "I know that my Redeemer lives."
