= James Elmslie Duncan =

English Chartist poet (1822–1854)

- Born: 7 March 1822; London, England
- Died: 21 May 1854 (aged 32); London, England
- Other name: James Elmzlie Duncan
- Occupations: Poet; editor; writer; activist
- Years active: 1844–1851

James Elmslie Duncan (Note: Duncan also spelled his middle name as Elmzlie.) (7 March 1822 – 21 May 1854) was an English Chartist poet, editor, writer, and activist for social and moral reform, vegetarianism, and temperance. He was also a phrenologist and shorthand tutor.

Duncan was born in London in 1822. He was a poet and secretary of the Concordium. He edited the Morning Star and later The Sunbeam, contributed to radical and reform periodicals, and wrote Defence of a Vegetable Diet. He was active in the Chartist movement in 1848 and was arrested after political meetings and street activity. His literary works included Flowers and Fruits and the novel Edward Noble. In 1851, Duncan was admitted to Colney Hatch Lunatic Asylum, where he died from epilepsy in 1854, aged 32.

== Biography ==
=== Early life ===
James Elmslie Duncan was born in London on 7 March 1822 and christened at All Hallows-on-the-Wall on 2 June 1822. He described himself as a "Londoner of Birth, Scottish by Parentage, Divinarian in principle". Duncan was the second son of James Duncan and his wife Ann. His father was a merchant and accountant born in Scotland and based in Wapping.

=== Literary and reform career ===
Duncan was associated with the Concordium, becoming its secretary by 1848. George Jacob Holyoake later described him as the community's poet and "a young enthusiast".

Duncan edited the Morning Star or Herald of Progress from December 1844 to January 1847 in Whitechapel and later edited The Sunbeam. The Morning Star was associated with J. A. Etzler, leader of the Tropical Emigration Society, and included articles on tropical vegetable products and foods. Duncan's contributions included a sketch of the Scottish poet William Thom. The Sunbeam, planned as a bi-monthly penny magazine, had one known issue in 1846 and included extracts from Duncan's collection Flowers and Fruits and his novel Edward Noble.

Duncan wrote Defence of a Vegetable Diet around 1843, with a second edition in 1844. The work was praised by Cleave's Gazette and the Mirror, and extracts were published in the Cheltenham Free Press. Flowers and Fruits received a favourable review from Lloyd's Newspaper, which described it as "a very respectable little collection for a mental feast." His novel Edward Noble, the Utopian; or the Dawning Glories of the Age of Love included idealised vegetarian and communist characters and fictionalised figures associated with reform, including Owen, Etzler, and Cobden. Its completion is unclear; two parts were known by March 1848.

In 1844, Duncan taught Pitman shorthand at Tower Hill and joined the Phonographic Corresponding Society. He produced the periodical Sunbeam and delivered lectures, including one in December 1846 titled On the Signs of the Times. His poetry was discussed in the Reasoner's 1847 review of H. S. Sutton's The Evangel of Love.

=== Chartist activities ===
Duncan took part in Chartist activity in 1848. In March, he recited "Tocsin against Tyranny" at a celebration of the French Revolution. After police intervention at a Chartist meeting in Bethnal Green, where Duncan was injured, he dedicated a poem to "The Murdered Chartist". In late May, he addressed a crowd in Clerkenwell Green, where his statement that he was a teetotaller and vegetarian received mixed reactions.

=== Arrest, asylum and death ===
The Times reported that Duncan had been charged with creating a nuisance in the Strand. In late July 1848, he was arrested in Upper East Smithfield after returning from a meeting of Chartists, socialists, repealers and sympathisers. He was carrying a pocket pistol, which he said was for self-protection because of earlier police violence. On 15 December 1848, he was discharged after being charged with obstructing a public thoroughfare by selling Chartist publications.

George Holyoake criticised Duncan's "professional eccentricity" and described his literary work as "wretched trash". Thomas Frost later described Duncan as a young man of ardent temperament whom he considered mentally unbalanced. In June 1851, Duncan's father brought him to court for stealing from the family business. According to James Gregory, the charge followed Duncan taking money from the business for personal use. After a struggle in the courtroom, the magistrate concluded that Duncan was insane and ordered him to be held in the workhouse before admission to an asylum.

Duncan was admitted to Colney Hatch Lunatic Asylum in July 1851. His condition was described in institutional records as "moral insanity accompanied with epilepsy". He died after a series of epileptic seizures on 21 May 1854, aged 32.

== Publications ==
- Flowers and Fruits; or, Poetry, Philosophy, and Science. 1843.
- Vegetable Diet. 1843.
- Edward Noble, Or, the Utopian. 1843.
