= List of international sports federations =

This is a list of international sports federations, each of which serves as a non-governmental governing body for a given sport and administers its sport at a world level, most often crafting rules, promoting the sport to prospective spectators and fans, developing prospective players, and organizing world or continental championships. Some international sports federations, such as World Aquatics and the International Skating Union, may oversee multiple activities referred to in common parlance as separate sports: World Aquatics, for example, governs swimming, diving, synchronised swimming, and water polo as separate "disciplines" within the single "sport" of Aquatics.

International sports federations form an integral part of the Olympic and Paralympic movements. Each Olympic sport is represented by its respective international sports federation, which in turn helps administer the events in its respective sport during the Games. For a sport to become an Olympic sport, its international sports federation must be recognized by the International Olympic Committee.

Likewise, an international sports federation must be recognized by the International Paralympic Committee for its sport to become a Paralympic sport, though in the latter case, several Paralympic Sports are governed by a dedicated committee of the International Paralympic Committee itself, under the World Para branding; for example, track and field athletics for disabled athletes is governed by the IPC itself, under the name "World Para Athletics". Other Paralympic sports are governed within the structure of the able-bodied equivalent; for example, the UCI governs both able-bodied and Paralympic cycling.

== Federations recognized by the International Olympic Committee (IOC) ==
=== Association of Summer Olympic International Federations (ASOIF) ===
International federations may apply to become a full member if they govern a core Summer Olympic sport or govern a sport which featured in the three most recent Summer Olympics. They may apply to become an associate member if they govern a sport included on the programme for future editions of the Summer Olympic Games or govern a sport which has featured in any five editions of the Summer Olympic Games since 1988.

As of June 2025, the Association of Summer Olympic International Federations (ASOIF) has 30 full member and six associate member international federations.

==== Full members ====
Sport	International federation	Acronym	Confederations	National associations	Year founded	President	Official website	Notes
Aquatics	World Aquatics	WAQU	5	209	1908	(Kuwait) Husain Al-Musallam	worldaquatics.com	
Archery	World Archery	WA	6	163	1931	(United States) Greg Easton	worldarchery.sport	(Note: Also a member of International World Games Association (IWGA).)
Athletics	World Athletics	WATH	5	214	1912	(United Kingdom) Sebastian Coe	worldathletics.org	
Badminton	Badminton World Federation	BWF	5	188	1934	(Thailand) Khunying Patama Leeswadtrakul	bwfbadminton.com	(Note: Also a member of The Association for International Sport for All (TAFISA).)
Basketball and 3x3	International Basketball Federation	FIBA	5	212	1932	(Qatar) Saud Ali Al Thani	fiba.basketball	
Canoeing	Paddle Worldwide	ICF	5	181	1924	(Germany) Thomas Konietzko	paddleworldwide.com	
Cycling	International Cycling Union	UCI	5	205	1900	(France) David Lappartient	uci.org	
Equestrian	International Federation for Equestrian Sports	FEI		134	1921	(Belgium) Ingmar De Vos	fei.org	
Fencing	International Fencing Federation	FIE	5	152	1913	(Egypt) Abdel Monem El-Husseiny (interim)	fie.org	
Field hockey	International Hockey Federation	FIH	5	128	1924	(Macau) Tayyab Ikram	fih.hockey	
Football, futsal and beach soccer	International Association Football Federation	FIFA	6	211	1904	(Switzerland) Gianni Infantino	fifa.com	
Golf	International Golf Federation	IGF		147	1958	(Sweden) Annika Sörenstam	igfgolf.org	
Gymnastics	World Gymnastics	WG	5	148	1881	(Japan) Morinari Watanabe	gymnastics.sport	
Handball	International Handball Federation	IHF	6	209	1946	(Egypt) Hassan Moustafa	ihf.info	
Judo	International Judo Federation	IJF		207	1951	(Romania) Marius Vizer	ijf.org	
Modern pentathlon	International Modern Pentathlon Union	UIPM	6	110	1948	(United States) Rob Stull	uipmworld.org	
Roller sports	World Skate	WSK	5	141	1924	(Italy) Sabatino Aracu	worldskate.org	
Rowing	World Rowing	FISA	5	159	1892	(France) Jean-Christophe Rolland	worldrowing.com	
Rugby union	World Rugby	WR	6	117	1886	(Australia) Brett Robinson	world.rugby	
Sailing	World Sailing	WS		140	1907	(China) Li Quanhai	sailing.org	
Shooting	International Shooting Sport Federation	ISSF		161	1907	(Italy) Luciano Rossi	issf-sports.org	
Climbing	World Climbing	WC		95	2007	(Italy) Marco Maria Scolaris	worldclimbing.com	
Surfing	International Surfing Association	ISA		113	1964	(Argentina) Fernando Aguerre	isasurf.org	
Table tennis	International Table Tennis Federation	ITTF		226	1926	(Sweden) Petra Sörling	ittf.com	
Taekwondo	World Taekwondo	WT		212	1973	(South Korea) Choue Chung-won	worldtaekwondo.org	
Tennis	World Tennis	ITF		207	1913	(United States) David Haggerty	itftennis.com	
Triathlon	World Triathlon	TRI	5	172	1989	(Spain) Antonio Fernández Arimany	triathlon.org	
Volleyball and beach volleyball	International Volleyball Federation	FIVB	5	222	1947	(Brazil) Fabio Azevedo	fivb.com	
Weightlifting	International Weightlifting Federation	IWF	5	192	1905	(Iraq) Mohamed Jalood	iwf.sport	
Wrestling, International grappling and Amateur MMA	United World Wrestling	UWW	5	180	1912	(Serbia) Nenad Lalović	uww.org	

==== Associate members ====
Sport	International federation	Acronym	Confederations	National associations	Year founded	President	Official website	Notes
American football	International Federation of American Football	IFAF	5	75	1998	(France) Pierre Trochet	americanfootball.sport	(Note: Also a member of Association of IOC Recognised International Sports Federations (ARISF).)
Baseball, Baseball5 & Softball	World Baseball Softball Confederation	WBSC	5	143	2013	(Italy) Riccardo Fraccari	wbsc.org	
Boxing	World Boxing	WB	5	106	2023	(Kazakhstan) Gennady Golovkin	worldboxing.org	
Cricket	International Cricket Council	ICC	5	105	1909	(India) Jay Shah	icc-cricket.com	
Lacrosse	World Lacrosse	WL	4	92	2008	(United States) Bob DeMarco	worldlacrosse.sport	
Squash	World Squash	WSF	5	115	1967	(United Kingdom) Zena Wooldridge	worldsquash.sport	

=== Winter Olympic Federations (WOF) ===
International sports federations that govern a sport in the programme of the Winter Olympic Games are members of the WOF. As of March 2025, it has seven full members and one associate member.

==== Full members ====
Sport	International federation	Acronym	National associations	Year founded	President	Official website	Notes
Biathlon	International Biathlon Union	IBU	61	1993	(Slovenia) Tim Farcnik	biathlonworld.com	
Bobsleigh & Skeleton	International Bobsleigh and Skeleton Federation	IBSF	74	1923	(Germany) Heike Groesswang	ibsf.org	
Curling	World Curling		71	1966	(United States) Beau Welling	worldcurling.org	
Ice hockey	International Ice Hockey Federation	IIHF	84	1908	(Germany) Franz Reindl	iihf.com	
Luge	International Luge Federation	FIL	53	1957	(Latvia) Einars Fogelis	fil-luge.org	
Ice skating	International Skating Union	ISU	101	1892	(South Korea) Kim Jae-youl	isu.org	
Skiing & Snowboarding	International Ski and Snowboard Federation	FIS	132	1924	(Liechtenstein) Alexander Ospelt	fis-ski.com	

==== Associate members ====
Sport	International federation	Acronym	National associations	Year founded	President	Official website	Notes
Ski mountaineering	International Ski Mountaineering Federation	ISMF	55	2008	(Switzerland) Regula Meier	ismf-ski.com	

=== Association of IOC Recognised International Sports Federations (ARISF) ===
The ARISF's members are recognised by the International Olympic Committee whose sport is currently not competed in either the Summer or Winter Olympics. As of March 2025, 40 governing bodies are members of the ARISF:

Sport	International federation	Acronym	National associations	Year founded	Official website	Notes
Air sports (Note: includes Aerobatics, Air racing, Hot air ballooning, Gliding, Hang gliding & Parachuting)	International Air Sports Federation	FAI	88	1905	fai.org	
American football (Note: includes Flag football)	International Federation of American Football	IFAF	74	1998	americanfootball.sport	(Note: Also an associate member of Association of Summer Olympic International Federations (ASOIF).)
Automobile sport	International Automobile Federation	FIA	145	1904	fia.com	
Bandy	Federation of International Bandy	FIB	28	1955	worldbandy.com	
Baseball, Baseball5 & Softball	World Baseball Softball Confederation	WBSC	207	2014	wbsc.org	
Basque pelota	International Federation of Basque Pelota	FIPV	33	1929	fipv.net	
Cue sports (Note: includes Carom billiards, Pool & Snooker)	World Confederation of Billiards Sports	WCBS	135	1992	wcbs.sport	
Boxing	World Boxing	WB	111	2023	worldboxing.org	(Note: Provisional member, pending ratification by ARISF general assembly.) (Note: Also a member of Alliance of Independent Recognized Members of Sport (AIMS).)
Boules (Note: includes Pétanque, Bocce volo, Raffa)	World Pétanque and Bowls Federation	WPBF	162	1985	fipjp.org	
Bowling (Note: includes Nine-pin bowling & Tenpin bowling)	International Bowling Federation	IBF	115	1926	bowling.sport	
Contract bridge	World Bridge Federation	WBF	97	1958	worldbridge.org	
Cheerleading	International Cheer Union	ICU	116	2004	cheerunion.org	
Chess	International Chess Federation	FIDE	201	1924	fide.com	
Climbing & Mountaineering	International Climbing and Mountaineering Federation	UIAA	97	1932	theuiaa.org	
Cricket	International Cricket Council	ICC	105	1909	icc-cricket.com	
Dancesport	World DanceSport Federation	WDSF	98	1957	worlddancesport.org	
Floorball	International Floorball Federation	IFF	81	1986	floorball.sport	
Frisbee sports	World Flying Disc Federation	WFDF	122	1985	wfdf.sport	
Ice stock sport	International Federation Icestocksport	IFI	56	1950	icestock.sport	
Karate	World Karate Federation	WKF	200	1970	wkf.net	
Kickboxing	World Association of Kickboxing Organizations	WAKO	143	1972	wako.sport	
Korfball	International Korfball Federation	IKF	71	1933	korfball.sport	
Lacrosse	World Lacrosse	WL	91	1974	worldlacrosse.sport	
Lifesaving	International Life Saving Federation	ILSF	180	1910	ilsf.org	
Motorcycle sport	International Motorcycling Federation	FIM	120	1904	fim-moto.com	
Muay Thai	International Federation of Muaythai Associations	IFMA	148	1993	muaythai.sport	
Netball	World Netball	WN	84	1960	netball.sport	
Orienteering	International Orienteering Federation	IOF	79	1961	orienteering.sport	
Polo	Federation of International Polo	FIP	76	1982	fippolo.com	
Powerboating	International Powerboating Union	UIM	65	1922	uim.sport	
Racquetball	International Racquetball Federation	IRF	73	1979	internationalracquetball.com	
Sambo	International Sambo Federation	FIAS	124	1984	sambo.sport	
Ski mountaineering	International Ski Mountaineering Federation	ISMF	47	1999	ismf-ski.com	(Note: Also an associate member of Winter Olympic Federations (WOF).)
Squash	World Squash	WS	118	1967	worldsquash.sport	
Sumo	International Sumo Federation	IFS	87	1992	International Sumo Federation	
Tug of war	Tug of War International Federation	TWIF	75	1960	tugofwar-twif.org	
Underwater sports	World Underwater Federation	CMAS	156	1959	cmas.org	
University sports	International University Sports Federation	FISU	164	1949	fisu.net	
Water skiing & Wakeboarding	International Waterski & Wakeboard Federation	IWWF	90	1946	iwwf.sport	
Wushu	International Wushu Federation	IWUF	160	1990	iwuf.org	

== Federations recognized by SportAccord, GAISF, or AIMS ==
Federations whose sports are either included in the Olympic Games (ASOIF, WOF) or recognized by the IOC (ARISF) are also stakeholders of SportAccord, after the dissolution of the Global Association of International Sports Federations (GAISF) in 2023. Other stakeholders of SportAccord (non-IOC recognized) compose the Alliance of Independent Recognized Members of Sport (AIMS).

=== Alliance of Independent Recognized Members of Sport (AIMS) ===
AIMS is a stakeholder of SportAccord that represents sports federations that were not yet recognized by the International Olympic Committee (IOC). As of September 2025, AIMS has 20 full member federations.

Sport	International federation	Acronym	National associations	Official website	Notes
Aikido	International Aikido Federation	IAF		aikido-international.org	
Angling (sport fishing)	Confédération Internationale de la Pêche Sportive	CIPS	113	cips-fips.com	
Arm wrestling	World Armwrestling Federation	WAF		waf-armwrestling.com	
Casting	International Casting Sport Federation	ICSF		icsf-castingsport.com	
Darts	World Darts Federation	WDF		dartswdf.com	
Dragon boat	International Dragon Boat Federation	IDBF		dragonboat.sport	
Draughts	World Draughts Federation	FMJD		fmjd.org	
Fistball	International Fistball Association	IFA	67	ifa-fistball.com	
Fitness & Bodybuilding	International Fitness and Bodybuilding Federation	IFBB		ifbb.com	
Go	International Go Federation	IGF		intergofed.org	
Sport Ju-Jitsu	Ju-Jitsu International Federation	JJIF		jjif.sport	
Kendo	International Kendo Federation	FIK	64	kendo-fik.org	
Miniature golf	World Minigolfsport Federation	WMF	64	gov.minigolfsport.com	
Powerlifting	International Powerlifting Federation	IPF		powerlifting.sport	
Practical shooting	International Practical Shooting Confederation	IPSC		ipsc.org	
Savate	Federation Internationale de Savate	FISav		savate.sport	
Sepak takraw	International Sepaktakraw Federation	ISTAF		sepaktakraw.one	
Sled dog sports	International Federation of Sleddog Sports	IFSS		sleddogsport.net	
Soft tennis	International Soft Tennis Federation	ISTF		softtennis-istf.com	
Teqball	International Federation of Teqball	FITEQ		fiteq.org	

==== Associate Members ====
As of September 2025, AIMS has 9 associate members.

Sport	International federation	Acronym	National associations	Year founded	Official website	Notes
American football	International Federation of American Football	IFAF	74	1998	americanfootball.sport	Now in ARISF
Cheerleading	International Cheer Union	ICU	116	2004	cheerunion.org	Now in ARISF
Frisbee sports	World Flying Disc Federation	WFDF	122	1985	wfdf.sport	Now in ARISF
Ice stock sport	International Federation Icestocksport	IFI	56	1950	icestock.sport	Now in ARISF
Kickboxing	World Association of Kickboxing Organizations	WAKO	143	1972	wako.sport	Now in ARISF
Lacrosse	World Lacrosse	WL	91	1974	worldlacrosse.sport	Now in ARISF
Muay Thai	International Federation of Muaythai Associations	IFMA	148	1993	muaythai.sport	Now in ARISF
Sambo	International Sambo Federation	FIAS	124	1984	sambo.sport	Now in ARISF
Ski mountaineering	International Ski Mountaineering Federation	ISMF	47	1999	ismf-ski.com	Now in ARISF

=== Observers of GAISF ===
Before the dissolution of GAISF in 2023, the GAISF Observer Status could be requested by the applicants for GAISF membership interested to obtain support and guidance in their path to fulfil the GAISF membership criteria. At the time of dissolution, it had 11 observers:

Sport	Organisation	Acronym	Official website	Notes
Dodgeball	World Dodgeball Association	WDA	dodgeball.sport	
Footgolf	Federation for International FootGolf	FIFG	fifg.org	
Jump rope	International Jump Rope Union	IJRU	ijru.sport	
Kettlebell lifting	International Union of Kettlebell Lifting	IUKL	giri-iukl.com/en	
Obstacle racing	World Obstacle	FISO	worldobstacle.org	
Padel	International Padel Federation	IPF	padelfip.com	
Poker	International Federation of Match Poker	IFMP	matchpoker.sport	
Pole sports	International Pole and Aerial Sports Federation	IPSF	ipsfsports.org	
Rafting	International Rafting Federation	IRF	internationalrafting.com	
Rugby league	Rugby League International Federation	IRL	intrl.sport	
Table football/soccer	International Table Soccer Federation	ITSF	tablesoccer.org	

=== Associate members of GAISF ===
Before the dissolution of GAISF in 2023, other than full members (composing ASOIF, AIOWF, ARISF and AIMS), there have been Associate members of GAISF. After the dissolution of GAISF, the proposal has been for its former associate members to be granted observer status at the SportAccord General Assembly. The following were associate members:

Sport	Federation
Commonwealth Games	Commonwealth Games Federation (CGF)
Masters Games	International Masters Games Association (IMGA)
Mediterranean Games	International Committee of Mediterranean Games (ICMG or CIJM)
Military World Games	International Military Sports Council (CISM)
World Mind Sports Games	International Mind Sports Association (IMSA)
	World Olympians Association (WOA)
	Panathlon International (PI)
Paralympic Games	International Paralympic Committee (IPC)
School Sports	International School Sport Federation (ISF)
Special Olympics	Special Olympics (SOI)
	International Association for Sports and Leisure Facilities (IAKS)
	International Federation of Sports Chiropractic (FICS)
Sports for the Deaf	International Committee of Sports for the Deaf (CISS)
	International Federation of Sports Medicine (FIMS)
	International Sports Press Association (AIPS)
CSIT World Sports Games	International Workers and Amateurs in Sports Confederation (CSIT)
World Games	International World Games Association (IWGA)
	World Union of Olympic Cities
	World Federation of the Sporting Goods Industry

== Federations recognized by the International Paralympic Committee (IPC) ==
There are 18 international federations recognized by the IPC, while the IPC itself serves as the international federation for five sports. IPC recognises also 3 International Organisations of Sports for the Disabled. And there are another 15 federations which are recognised by the IPC but are not eligible to be IPC members.

=== Sports directly governed by IPC ===
On 30 November 2016, the IPC adopted the "World Para" brand for all 10 of the sports that it directly governed at that time. At the 2021 IPC General Assembly, IPC members provided a strong mandate for the IPC to cease acting as the international federation for 10 sports by the end of 2026. Para-alpine skiing, para cross country skiing and para snowboard were transferred to FIS, and Para biathlon was transferred to IBU to be overseen by a joint steering committee involving IBU and FIS. Para dance sport was transferred to World Abilitysport as of 1 January 2024. Currently IPC acts as the international federation for five sports:

Sport	IPC sport committee name
Para athletics	World Para Athletics
Para ice hockey	World Para Ice Hockey
Para powerlifting	World Para Powerlifting
Shooting para sport	World Shooting Para Sport
Para swimming	World Para Swimming

=== International Federations ===
International Federations are independent sport federations recognised by the IPC as the sole representative of a Paralympic sport. As of August 2025, the IPC recognises 18 International Federations representing 20 parasports:

Sport	Federation
Para alpine skiing, para cross-country skiing, para snowboard	International Ski and Snowboard Federation (FIS)
Para archery	World Archery (WA)
Para badminton	Badminton World Federation (BWF)
Boccia	Boccia International Sports Federation (BISFed) (Note: Branded as "World Boccia".)
Para biathlon	International Biathlon Union (IBU) (Note: In cooperation with FIS.)
Para equestrian	International Equestrian Federation (FEI)
Paracanoe	International Canoe Federation (ICF)
Paraclimbing	International Federation of Sport Climbing (IFSC)
Para cycling	Union Cycliste Internationale (UCI)
Para rowing	World Rowing Federation (FISA)
Sitting volleyball	World ParaVolley (WPV)
Para table tennis	International Table Tennis Federation (ITTF)
Para taekwondo	World Taekwondo (WT)
Para triathlon	World Triathlon
Wheelchair basketball	International Wheelchair Basketball Federation (IWBF)
Wheelchair curling	World Curling Federation (WCF)
Wheelchair rugby	World Wheelchair Rugby
Wheelchair tennis	International Tennis Federation (ITF)

=== International Organisations of Sports for the Disabled ===
International Organisations of Sports for the Disabled (IOSDs) are independent organisations recognised by the IPC as the sole representatives of a specific impairment group. The IPC currently recognises 3 IOSDs:

Sport	Federation
Wheelchair fencing, powerchair hockey, world para dance sport, frame running, wheelchair slalom, frame football	World Abilitysport
Blind football, goalball, para judo	International Blind Sports Federation (IBSA)
For athletes with an intellectual disability	International Virtus Sports Federation

Following two years of talks, and relevant decisions by both their General Assemblies, on 1 January 2023, the Cerebral Palsy International Sports and Recreation Association (CPISRA) and the International Wheelchair and Amputee Sports Federation (IWAS) were merged to form World Abilitysport.

=== IPC-recognised international sports federations (not eligible for membership) ===
The IPC recognises a number of international sports federations which are not eligible to be IPC members, but contribute to the development of sport opportunities for athletes associated with the Paralympic Movement and have organisational goals that are compatible with the Vision and Mission of the IPC. The following 15 are IPC-recognised international sport federations:

Sport	Federation
Armwrestling	World Armwrestling Federation (WAF)
Blind SAMBO	International SAMBO Federation (FIAS)
Bobsleigh	International Bobsleigh & Skeleton Federation (IBSF)
Bowling	International Bowling Federation (IBF)
CP football	International Federation of CP Football (IFCPF)
Flying Disc	World Flying Disc Federation (WFDF)
Golf	International Golf Federation (IGF)
Handball	International Handball Federation (IHF)
Field hockey	International Hockey Federation (FIH)
Karate	World Karate Federation
Modern pentathlon	International Modern Pentathlon Union (UIPM)
Powerchair football	International Federation of Powerchair Football (FIPFA)
Sailing	World Sailing
Surfing	International Surfing Association (ISA)
Para Bowls	World Bowls

== Non-SportAccord and non-GAISF federations that are TAFISA members ==
The international federations listed below, for the time being, are not members of Global Association of International Sports Federations (GAISF) or SportAccord, but are among the international members of The Association for International Sport for All (TAFISA).

Sport	Organisation	Official website	Notes
Alysh	International Federation of Wrestling on Belts (Alysh)		
Arm wrestling	International Armwrestling Federation	armsportfederation.com	
Baton twirling	International Baton Twirling Federation Inc	www.ibtf-batontwirling.org	
Beach tennis	International Federation of Beach Tennis	ifbt.eu	
Bodybuilding, fitness physique, athletic physique, sports physique and model physique	World Bodybuilding & Physique Sports Federation	wbpsf.org	
Brazilian jiu-jitsu	Sport Jiu-Jitsu International Federation (SJJIF)	sjjif.com	
Bocce	Confederazione Boccistica Internationale	cbi-prv.org	
Cardio	International Association of Cardio HIIT Sports (IACHS)	cardiohiit.org	
Sports Chanbara (Spochan)	International Sports Chanbara Association	internationalsportschanbara.net	
Cheerleading	International Federation of Cheerleading	ifccheer.org	
Dancesport	World Dance Council Ltd.	wdcdance.com	
Dancesport	International Dance Organisation (IDO)	ido-dance.com	
Dancesport	International Dance Sport Association	idsa.com.ua	
Darts	International Dart Federation	idfdarts.org	
Dodgeball	World Dodgeball Federation	worlddodgeballfederation.com	
Draughts	International Draughts Federation	fmjd64.org , idf64.org	
e-Sports	International e-Sports Federation (IeSF)	iesf.org	
Field archery	International Field Archery Association	ifaa-archery.org	
Functional fitness	International Functional Fitness Federation	functionalfitness.sport	
Hangung	World Hangung Association	hangung.org (archived)	
Hapkido	World Hapkido Confederation	worldhapkido.info	
Hapkido	World Hapkido Federation	(WHF) (archived)	
Jiu-jitsu	World Jiu Jitsu Confederation	jujitsu4all.org	
Judo	World Judo Federation – Judo for All	worldjudofederation.online	
Jukskei	International Jukskei Federation (IJF)	jukskei-international.co.za/	
Kabaddi	International Kabaddi Federation (IKF)	kabaddiikf.com	
Kabaddi	World Kabaddi	theworldkabaddi.org (archived)	
Kempo	International Kempo Federation	kempoikf.com	
Kettlebell sport	World Kettlebell Sport Federation	wksf.site	
Kūdō	Kudo International Federation	ku-do.org	
Kungfu Dragon & Lion Dance	World Kungfu Dragon & Lion Dance Federation	plbsi.org	
Martial arts	World Martial Arts Committee (WMAC)	wmac.info	
Majorette sport	Majorette-Sport World Federation	majorettes-mwf.net	
NaB Golf	International NaB Golf Federation	nabgolf.org (archived)	
Nordic walking	International Nordic Walking Federation (INWA)	inwa-nordicwalking.com	
Pahuyuth	World Pahuyuth Federation	pahuyuth.org	(Note: It is a supporter member of TAFISA.)
Pilates	World Pilates Confederation	worldpilatesconfederation.com	
Police martial arts	International Police Martial Arts Federation		
Quadball	International Quadball Association (formerly International Quidditch Association) (IQA)	iqasport.org/	
Qwan Ki Do	International Qwan Ki Do Federation and Associated Disciplines (IQKDF)	iqkdf.org	
Rafting	World Rafting Federation (associated with International Canoe Federation (ICF))	worldrafting.com	
Shotokan karate	Shotokan Karate Do of United Nations	skdun.org	
Silambam	World Silambam Association (WSA)	silambam.world	
SPOQCS	International SPOQCS Federation	SIF	
Taekwondo	International Taekwon-do Federation	itftkd.sport	
Taekwondo	World Association of Taekwondo for All		
Tchoukball	International Tchoukball Federation	tchoukball.org	
Traditional karate	International Traditional Karate Federation (ITKF)	itkf.global	
Traditional Taekwondo	International Traditional Taekwon-do Federation	ittaf.com	
Zurkhaneh	International Zurkhaneh Sports Federation (IZSF)	izsf.ch/en/	

== Other federations ==
The international federations listed below are not related to either of Global Association of International Sports Federations, SportAccord or The Association for International Sport for All (TAFISA):

Sport	Federation
Aesthetic group gymnastics	International Federation of Aesthetic Group Gymnastics (IFAAG)
Amputee football	World Amputee Football Federation (WAFF)
Arnis	World Eskrima Kali Arnis Federation (WEKAF)
Australian rules football	Australian Football International (AFI)
Axe throwing	International Axe Throwing Federation (IATF)
Beach handball	World Beach Handball Association (WBHA)
Beach soccer	Beach Soccer Worldwide (BSWW) (associated with Fédération Internationale de Football Association (FIFA)
Beeni	World Beeni Federation (WBF)
Brazilian jiu-jitsu	Sport Jiu-Jitsu International Federation (SJJIF)
Bodyboarding	International Bodyboarding Corporation (IBC)
Bodybuilding, fitness, figure, bikini, physique and wellness	International Federation of Bodybuilding & Fitness Professional League (IFBB Pro League)
Boot throwing	International Bootthrowing Association (IBTA)
Bowls	Professional Bowls Association (PBA)
Bowls	World Bowls (WB)
Boxing	International Boxing Association (IBA)
Boxing	World Professional Boxing Federation (WPBF)
Broomball	International Federation of Broomball Associations (IFBA)
Camel racing	World Camelids Sports (WCS)
Card games (Gin Rummy, Guandan, Two Against One, Open Face Poker)	Federation of Card Games (FCG)
Catch wrestling	The Snake Pit (Wigan)
Chess boxing	World Chess Boxing Organization (WCBO)
Circle rules football	Circle Rules Federation
Correspondence chess	International Correspondence Chess Federation (ICCF)
Croquet	World Croquet Federation (WCF)
Crossminton	International Crossminton Organisation (ICO)
Debating	World Universities Debating Council (WUDC)
Debating (in Spanish)	Consejo Mundial de Debate (CMD)
Disc golf	Professional Disc Golf Association (PDGA)
Dueball	International Dueball Association
eSports	Global Esports Federation (GEF)
Elephant polo	World Elephant Polo Association (WEPA)
Floor tennis	World Floor Tennis Federation (WFTF)
Footvolley	International Footvolley Federation (FIFv)
Footvolley	European Footvolley League (EFVL)
Futnet / Football Tennis	Union Internationale de Futnet (UNIF)
Futnet / Football Tennis	Federation International de Footballtennis Association (FIFTA)
Futsal	Asociación Mundial de Futsal (AMF)
Gateball	World Gateball Union (WGU)
Gillidanda	Gilli Danda International Federation (GDIF)
Gorodki	International Federation of Gorodki Sport (IFGS)
Greyhound racing	World Greyhound Racing Federation (WGRF) [non-regulatory body]
Ground golf	International Ground Golf Federation (IGGF)
Ham radio contesting, amateur radio direction finding, and high speed telegraphy / Radiosport	International Amateur Radio Union (IARU)
International fronton / Wallball / One-wall handball	International Ball game Confederation (CIJB)
International fronton / Wallball / One-wall handball	World Handball Council (WHC)
International fronton / Wallball / One-wall handball	World Wall Ball Association (WWBA)
Hapkido	World Hapkido Federation (WHF)
Hapkido	The World Hapkido General Federation
Hapkido boxing	Hapkido Boxing International Organization (HBIO)
Harness horse racing	Harness Horsemen International (HHI)
Harness horse racing	European Trotting Union(UET)
Horseback archery	International Horseback Archery Alliance (IHAA)
Horse racing	International Federation of Horseracing Authorities (IFHA)
Ice cross downhill	All Terrain Skate Cross Federation (ATSX)
Intercrosse	Fédération Internationale d'Inter-Crosse (FIIC)
Jeu de paume and related ball games	International Ball game Confederation (CIJB)
Juggling	World Juggling Federation (WJF)
Jorkyball	Jorkyball International Federation (JIF)
Kendo	World Kendo Association
Kho kho	International Kho Kho Federation (IKKF)
Kickball	World Adult Kickball Association (WAKA)
Kickboxing	International Kickboxing Federation (IKF)
Kin-Ball	International Kin-Ball Sport Federation (FIKB/IKBF)
Kite sports	International Federation of Kitesports Organisations (IFKO)
Krav maga	International Krav Maga Federation (IKMF)
Kung-Do	International Kung-Do Federation (IKDF)
Lethwei	World Lethwei Federation (WLF)
Land sailing	World Landsailing Organisation (FISLY)
Leg cricket	International Leg Cricket Council
Mahjong	Mahjong International League (MIL)
Mahjong	World Mahjong Organization (WMO)
Majorette sport and Twirling	World Association of Majorette-sport and Twirling (WAMT)
Mallakhamb	Mallakhamb Confederation of World (MCW)
Mallakhamb	Vishwa Mallakhamb Federation (VMF)
Minifootball	World Minifootball Federation (WMF)
Mixed martial arts	International Mixed Martial Arts Federation (IMMAF)
Mixed martial arts	Global Association of Mixed Martial Arts
Mixed martial arts	Asian Mixed Martial Arts Association/Federation of International Mixed Martial Arts
Modern Arnis	International Modern Arnis Federation (IMAF)
Mountain running	World Mountain Running Association (WMRA) (associated with World Athletics)
Mountainboarding	International Mountainboard Association (IMA)
Muay Thai	World Muaythai Council (WMC)
Obstacle sports (O-sport)	World O-Sport Federation (WOF)
Othello	World Othello Federation (WOF)
Padbol	International Federation of Padbol Associates (FIPA)
Parkour	World Freerunning Parkour Federation (WFPF)
Pencak Silat	International Pencak Silat Federation (IPSF)
Pickleball	International Pickleball Federation (IPF), World Pickleball Federation (WPF), Global Pickleball Federation (GPF), United Pickleball Association of America (UPF-A)
Pitch and putt	Federation of International Pitch and Putt Associations (FIPPA)
Pitch and putt	International Pitch and Putt Association (IPPA)
Pogo stick	World Pogo Stick Federation (WPSF)
Polocrosse	International Polocrosse Council (IPC)
Puzzle	World Puzzle Federation (WPF)
Quizzing	International Quizzing Association (IQA)
Racketlon	International Racketlon Federation (FIR)
Radio-controlled car racing	International Federation of Model Auto Racing (IFMAR)
Real Tennis	International Real Tennis Professionals Association (IRTPA)
Renju	Renju International Federation (RIF)
Ringball	International Ringball Federation (IRF)
Ringette	International Ringette Federation (IRF)
Rogaining	International Rogaining Federation (IRF)
Roll Ball	International Roll Ball Federation (IRBF)
Rope skipping	World Rope Skipping Confederation (WRSC)
Rope skipping	World Inter-School Rope Skipping Organisation (WIRSO)
Rope skipping	International Rope Skipping Organisation (IRSO)
Rope skipping	World Rope Skipping Federation (WRSF)
Roundnet	International Roundnet Federation (IRF)
Rubik's Cube	World Cube Association (WCA)
Scootering	International Scooter Federation (ISF)
Shooting sport	International Shooting Federation of Hunting Sport Weapons (FITASC)
Shooting sport	International Clay Target Shooting Federation (ICTSF)
Shooting sport	International Confederation of Fullbore Rifle Associations (ICFRA)
Shooting sport	International Metallic Silhouette Shooting Union (IMSSU)
Shooting sport	International Precision Rifle Federation (IPRF)
Shooting sport	Muzzle Loaders Associations International Committee (MLAIC)
Shooting sport	Single Action Shooting Society (SASS)
Shooting sport	Steel Challenge Shooting Association (SCSA)
Shooting sport	World Association PPC 1500 (WA1500)
Shuttlecock	International Shuttlecock Federation (ISF)
Silambam	International Silambam Committee (ISC)
Skateboarding	World Skateboarding Federation (WSF) (separate from World Skate)
Skibobbing	International Skibob Federation (FISB)
Slacklining	International Slacklining Association (ISA)
Slamball	Slamball League
Slot car racing	International Slot Racing Association (ISRA)
Socca	International Socca Federation (ISF)
Sport stacking	World Sport Stacking Association (WSSA)
Spinning Top	International Top Spinners Association (ITSA)
Ssireum	World Ssireum Federation (WSF)
Stratego	International Stratego Federation (ISF)
Street and ball hockey	International Street and Ball Hockey Federation (ISBHF)
Strongman (and Para-Strongman)	World Strongman International Union (WSM)
Sqay	International Council of Sqay (ICS)
Surf kayak	World Surf Kayak Association (WSKA)
Table hockey	International Table Hockey Federation (ITHF)
Tag	World Chase Tag
Tank biathlon	International Federation of Tank Biathlon (Международная федерация танкового биатлона)
Targetball	International Targetball Federation (ITF)
Tennis polo	Tennis Polo Association (TPA)
Tent pegging	International Tent Pegging Federation (ITPF)
Throwball	International Throwball Federation (ITF)
Touch football	Federation of International Touch (FIT)
Trail running	International Trail Running Association (ITRA) (associated with World Athletics)
Ukrainian National Wrestling on Belts	International Federation on Ukrainian National Wrestling on Belts
Ultra running	International Association of Ultrarunners (IAU) (associated with World Athletics)
Unicycling	International Unicycling Federation (IUF)
Va'a	International Va'a Federation (IVF) (associated with International Canoe Federation (ICF))
Valari	International Valari Federation (IVF)
Volksmarching	International Volkssport Federation (IVV)
Virtual motorsport	Global Virtual Motorsport Association (GVMA)
Vovinam	World Vovinam Federation (WVVF)
VX (formerly Rock-It-Ball)	Global VX (formerly International Rock-It-Ball Federation (IRIBF))
Waveski surfing	World Waveski Surfing Association (WWSA) (associated with International Canoe Federation (ICF)))
Wheel gymnastics	International Wheel Gymnastics Federation (IRV)
Wingfoiling	Global Wingsports Association (GWA)
Wingfoiling	International Wing Sports Association (IWSA) (both associated with World Sailing)
Xiangqi	World Xiangqi Federation (WXF)
Yoga	Yogasports Confederation of World (YCW)
Yoga	International Yoga Sports Federation (IYSF)
Yo-Yo	International Yo-Yo Federation (IYYF)

=== Defunct federations ===
Sport	Federation
Baton twirling	World Baton Twirling Federation (merged with NBTA Global Alliance and formed IBTF)
Bodyboarding	International Bodyboarding Association (IBA)
Rope Skipping	International Rope Skipping Federation (IRSF), World Jump Rope Federation (WJRF) (merged and formed IJRU)
Strongman	International Federation of Strength Athletes (IFSA)

=== Miscellaneous ===
- International Game Fish Association (IGFA)
- International Gay Bowling Organization (IGBO)
- International Federation of Corporate Football (FIFCO)

== Sports governed by national associations ==
Certain sports are currently not governed by international federations, but rather by national associations.

Sport	Federation
American handball	United States Handball Association (USHA)
Cageball	Norwegian Football Association, Hungarian Cageball Association, Japan Cageball Association
Canadian five-pin bowling	Canadian 5 Pin Bowlers Association (C5PBA)
Charreria	Federación Mexicana de Charrería
Gaelic football, Gaelic handball, Hurling, and International rules football	Gaelic Athletic Association (GAA)
Greyhound racing	American Greyhound Track Operators Association (AGTOA), Greyhound Board of Great Britain (GBGB)
Horseshoes	National Horseshoe Pitchers Association of America (NHPA)
Jombola	Jombola Association Malaysia
Oină	Romanian Oină Federation
Paddleball	National Paddleball Association (NPA)
Paleta frontón	Federación Peruana de Paleta Frontón (FDPPF)
Paso Fino	Paso Fino Horse Association (PFHA)
Pato	Federación Argentina de Pato y Horseball (FAP)
Pesäpallo (Finnish baseball)	Suomen Pesäpalloliitto Ry (Finnish Pesäpallo Association)
Pigeon racing	Royal Pigeon Racing Association (RPRA)
Rodeo	Professional Rodeo Cowboys Association (PRCA)
Rounders	Rounders England (formerly National Rounders Association (NRA)), Gaelic Athletic Association (GAA)
Rugby fives	Rugby Fives Association (RFA)
Shinty	Camanachd Association
Underwater football	Manitoba Underwater Council
Wallyball	American Wallyball Association (AWA)

== See also ==
- Sport
- Olympic sports
- Paralympic sports
- World Games sports
- International Olympic Committee
- International Paralympic Committee
- Association of Summer Olympic International Federations
- Winter Olympic Federations
- Association of IOC Recognised International Sports Federations
- SportAccord
- International World Games Association
- Global Association of International Sports Federations
