= Jump rope (disambiguation) =

Jump rope is a sport, or its namesake piece of equipment.

Jump rope may also refer to:

- "Jump Rope", a song from the album Approaching Normal by Blue October
- "Jump Rope", a song from the album Gone Fishing by The Cool Kids
- "Jump Rope", a song from the album One Man's Trash by Trey Anastasio
- "Jump Rope", a song by Three Loco
- "Jump-Rope", a song from the album Flapjacks from the Sky by Gandalf Murphy and the Slambovian Circus of Dreams

== See also ==
- Rope jumping, a sporting activity similar to bungee jumping but with a less elastic tether
- Chinese jump rope
