= Look ma, no hands =

Look ma, no hands and similar phrases may refer to:

- Look Mom... No Hands, a 2004 album by American hip hop musician Vast Aire
- "Look Ma No Hands", a track on the 2004 Flapjacks from the Sky album by Gandalf Murphy and the Slambovian Circus of Dreams
- Look Ma! No Hands Productions, film producer who released, e.g., 2009 film Virtuality
- "Look Ma No Hands", a 2011 instrumental track by American rapper André 3000
- Look Ma, No Hands (book), a 2025 book by Gabrielle Drolet

== See also ==
- No Hands
- Look Mom No Head!
- Look Heart, No Hands
- Look Ma, No Brains!
