= Skipping-rope rhyme =

Rhyme chanted by children while skipping

A skipping rhyme (occasionally skipping-rope rhyme or jump-rope rhyme), is a rhyme chanted by children while skipping. Such rhymes have been recorded in all cultures where skipping is played. Examples of English-language rhymes have been found going back to at least the 17th century. Like most folklore, skipping rhymes tend to be found in many different variations. This article includes chants used by English-speaking children.

== History ==
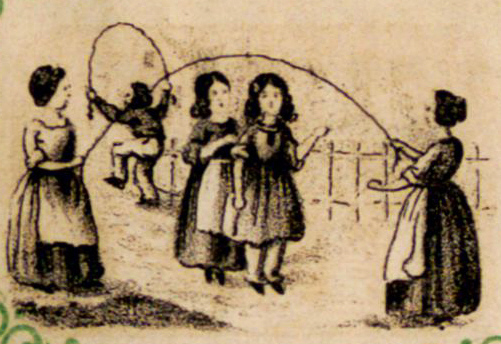
German illustration of girls skipping, c. 1860

Explorers reported seeing Aboriginal Australians jumping with vines in the 16th century. European boys started jumping rope in the early 17th century. The activity was considered indecent for girls because they might show their ankles. There were no associated chants. This changed in the early 18th century as girls began to jump rope. They added the chants, owned the rope, controlled the game, and decided who participated.

In the United States, domination of the activity by girls occurred when their families moved into the cities in the late 19th century. There, they found sidewalks and other smooth surfaces conducive to jumping rope, along with a host of contemporaries. American educator Lucy Nulton studied the rhymes of jumping rope in the mid-20th century.

Another source suggests that, prior to 1833, the invention of pantalettes enabled girls to jump rope without displaying ankles.

Chants are intended to structure the game and are secondary, which explains the nonsense or irrational lyrics. These chants are unusual inasmuch as they were transmitted from child to child usually without an underlying reason, as opposed to nursery rhymes which were transmitted from adult to child and often contained a moral. Chants may contain girlish references to boyfriends or marriage. Chants rhyme at the end of the lines and they are catchy with a rhythm that is easy to pick up.

== Examples of chants ==
Two children with a long rope stand about 12 feet (3.7 m) apart and turn the rope as other children take turns jumping. If one is not a good jumper, they can become an 'Ever-Laster'; that is, they would perpetually turn the rope. When it is a child's turn to jump, they enter as the rope is turned, and jump to the rhyme until they miss. Then they become a rope-turner, and the next child in line takes their place.

=== Jump in, jump out ===
For a line of potential jumpers, the jumpers are restricted on time by the length of the chant. They jump in at the beginning, jump out at the end, and the next jumper takes their turn.

Charlie Chaplin went to France
To teach the ladies how to dance.
First the heel, then the toe,
Then the splits, and around you go!
Salute to the Captain,
Bow to the Queen,
And turn your back on the Nazi submarine!

In another version, the teacher is "Benjamin Franklin." In the Charlie Chaplin rhyme, the child jumping has to follow directions as the rope is turning: touching the heel of one foot on the ground; touching the toe of the same foot on the ground; doing a (short) split of the feet, turning around, saluting, bowing, and jumping out from the turning rope on the last line. This rhyme, c. 1942, reflects children's awareness of World War II.

An Australian version of the Charlie Chaplin Skipping Song, as sung at Salisbury Primary School in Brisbane, Australia in the mid-1950s, is as follows:

Charlie Chaplin went to France,
To teach the ladies how to dance,
First he did the Rumba,
Then he did the twist,
Then he did the Highland Fling,
And then he did the splits.

There is also "Betty Grable went to France,/To teach the soldiers how to dance." (The rest is the same.)

Had a little car car,
Two-forty-eight,
Ran around the cor-(skipper jumps out, and turners continue the syllable until they reenter)-ner
and slammed on the brakes, but the brakes didn't work,
So I bumped into a lady who bumped into a man,
Who bumped into a police car, man, oh man!
Policeman caught me
Put me on his knee,
Asked me a question
Will you marry me?
Yes, No, Maybe So (repeated)

All in together, birds of a feather:
January, February, March, April, May, etc. (each child had to jump in during the month they were born).

I see London, I see France,
I see (xxx)s underpants,
Not too big, not too small,
Just the size of Montreal (or just the size of cannonball, Berlin Wall, etc.)

Another variation:

I see London, I see France, I see (xxx)s underpants.
Are they blue? Are they pink? I don't know but they sure stink!
Teacher, teacher, I declare, I see (xxx)s underwear (or bottom's bare)

==== Political statement ====
In Dublin, Ireland, the visits of inspectors known as "glimmer men" to private houses to enforce regulations to prevent the use of coal gas in restricted hours during the Emergency gave rise to:

Keep it boiling on the glimmer, if you don't you get no dinner.

=== Counting rhymes ===
Most rhymes are intended to count the number of jumps the skipper takes without stumbling. These are essentially restricted to times when there were relatively few jumpers and time was abundant. These rhymes can take very simple forms.

This chant was collected in London in the 1950s:

Big Ben strikes one,
Big Ben strikes two,
Big Ben strikes three,
(etc.)

and

Applesauce, mustard, cider
How many legs has a spider?
1, 2, 3, etc.

alternatively, "Salt, vinegar, mustard, pepper. How many legs does a spider have? 1,2,3, etc."

Butterfly, butterfly: turn around. [jumper turns while jumping]
Butterfly, butterfly: touch the ground [jumper touches the ground as they are jumping]
Butterfly, butterfly: show your shoe. […thrusts out their shoe]
Butterfly, butterfly: [n] to do.
One, two, three, ... [up to the count of n, which increases by 1 with each set of jumpers]

Another rendition substitutes, "teddy bear" for "butterfly". This can be dated no earlier than the early 20th century, to the term of Theodore Roosevelt.

In another skipping rhyme, once the alphabet finishes, participants continue with numbers until the skipper catches the rope. It is natural for participants to use the letter that the skipper lost on and to use it to find someone's name following the rule of either best friend or boyfriend, depending on what is chosen at the beginning.

Ice cream, Soda pop, cherry on top,
Who's your best friend, let's find out;
Goes A! B! C!

or

Ice cream soda, cherry on top
Who's your boyfriend/girlfriend, I forgot;
Is it an A! B! C!

or

Ice cream sundae, banana split
[Name of jumper]'s got a boyfriend/girlfriend,
Who is it?
A! B! C!

or

Ice cream soda, Delaware Punch,
Tell me the name of my honey-bunch.
A, B, C, etc.

Another counting rhyme:

Cinderella dressed in yellow, went upstairs (or downstairs) to kiss her fellow, kissed a snake, by mistake, how many doctors will it take? 1, 2, 3, 4, 5, 6, 7, 8, 9, 10 etc. (Go to 20 then go down to the next line)
Cinderella dressed in blue, went upstairs to tie her shoe, made a mistake and tied a knot, how many knots will she make? 1, 2, 3, etc.
Cinderella dressed in green, went downtown to buy a ring, made a mistake and bought a fake, how many days before it breaks? 1, 2, 3, etc.
Cinderella dressed in lace, went upstairs to fix her face, oh no oh no, she found a blemish, how many powder puffs till she's finished? 1, 2, 3, etc.
Cinderella dressed in silk, went outside to get some milk, made a mistake and fell in the lake, how many more till she gets a break? 1, 2, 3, etc.

The counting continues as long as the jumper avoids faulting. If they do then the counting starts again.

=== Miscellaneous ===
Skipping chants need not always be rhymes, they can be games, such as a game called "School". In "Kindergarten" (the first round), all skippers must run through rope without skipping. In "First Grade", all skippers must skip in, skip once, and skip out without getting caught in the rope, and so on. Also, there is "Mouse Trap", where there is a special pattern, and players must run through rope without getting caught. If caught, the jumper caught must hold the rope.

"Diamonds" pattern (the letters spelling "Diamond" are chanted)

Chinese jump rope patterns are often accompanied by chants. The diamonds pattern is accompanied by the letters which spell "diamond" ("D-I-A-M-O-N-D-S."), while the Americans pattern, as are many patterns, is accompanied by the names of the moves made while carrying out the pattern ("right, left, right, left, in, out/open, in, on.").

=== Speed rhymes ===
Some rhymes are intended to test the agility of the jumper by turning the rope more rapidly. The key word to start turning fast is often "pepper" to indicate speed, such as:

Mable, Mable,
Set the table,
Don't forget the salt,
Vinegar,
Mustard,
Pepper! (rapid turning follows)

When "red hot peppers" was called, the turners would turn the rope as fast as they could.

=== Pretty Little Dutch Girl ===
"Pretty Little Dutch Girl" was a lengthy song, much too long for a simple chant, but often excerpted for jumping rope. "My husband's name is Fatty. He comes from Cincinnati…" Or alphabetical, "My husband's name is Alfred, He comes from Atlanta, He works in the attic…" All made up on the spur of the moment. The jumper may be obliged to jump out upon finishing a letter, or be allowed to continue until either failing to invent new lyrics, or faulting.

=== Historical rhymes ===
Other rhymes are highly topical, and sometimes survive long after the events that inspired them have disappeared from the headlines. Perhaps the most notorious rhyme of this type is one that began circulating during the 1892 trial of Lizzie Borden. Despite Borden's desire to stay out of the public eye – and despite the fact that she was found not guilty – children would follow her around and chant the rhyme. It later started being used as a rhyme used when skipping rope:

Lizzie Borden took an axe
She gave her mother forty whacks,
After she saw what she had done,
She gave her father forty-one.
Lizzie Borden got away,
For her crime she did not pay.

Variations of this following rhyme, a wordplay on "influenza," were heard around the time of the 1918 flu pandemic:

I had a little bird,
And its name was Enza.
I opened the window
And in-flew-enza.

This one from Prohibition:

No, I won't go to Casey's any more, more, more,
There's a big fat policeman by the door, door, door.
He grabs you by the collar,
And makes you pay a dollar.
No, I won't go to Casey's any more.

== See also ==
- Chinese jump rope
- Clapping game
