= Gandalf Murphy and the Slambovian Circus of Dreams =

American folk-rock band

The Slambovian Circus of Dreams
- Also known as: The Slambovian Circus of Dreams, The Grand Slambovians, Gandalf Murphy & the Slambovian Circus of Dreams
- Origin: Sleepy Hollow, New York
- Genres: Folk rock, Americana, psychedelia
- Instruments: Guitar, harmonica, mandolin, accordion, flute, ukulele, melodica, theremin, cello, bass, percussion
- Years active: 1998–present
- Labels: Storm King Records, Talking Elephant Records UK
- Members: Joziah Longo, Sharkey McEwen, Tink Lloyd, Bob Torsello, RJ McCarty, Matthew Abourezk
- Past members: Tony Zuzulo, Chen Longo, Orien Longo, Eric Puente, Felipe Torres
- Website: www.slambovia.com

The Slambovian Circus of Dreams is a Hudson Valley, New York based band which was founded in Sleepy Hollow in 1998. The band's music is a form of folk rock, americana and is sometimes described as "Hillbilly Pink Floyd," or "Punk Classical Hillbilly Floyd. Their sixth studio album, A Very Unusual Head was released Jan 2022 on their own label, Storm King Records and in May 2022 on Talking Elephant Records for UK/EU release. A Box of Everything a greatest hits compilation was released April 1, 2014, on the Red River Entertainment label.

The band regularly plays the major americana/folk venues, clubs, theaters, and music festivals in the Northeastern, and East North Central United States and Canada. They also tour in other regions of the United States, including California and Florida. In August 2008 they made their first appearance outside of North America, at the Rhythm Festival in England. Their reception there was so enthusiastic that they were invited back for the 2009 festival, as well as several other UK festivals in the summer of 2009. The band performed at Glastonbury Festival in 2010 and toured the UK in subsequent years. The band returns to the UK in August 2022. Performances include the legendary Fairport Cropredy Festival, Wickham Festival and several high profile venues.

The vibe of the band is best captured by a live concert, or in live recordings. The band is noted for the dedication and support shown by fans. Some fans travel hundreds of miles to attend concerts. A high point of the year for many fans are the band's Halloween shows (Grand Slambovian Hillbilly Pirate Ball, Grand Slambovian Surrealist Ball, Rock'n'Roll Seance, etc.) and Very Slambovian Christmas shows.

== Members ==
The band's current lineup is:

- Joziah Longo – lead vocals, guitar, harmonica
- Sharkey McEwen – lead guitar, backing vocals, mandolin
- Tink Lloyd – accordion, cello, flute, piccolo, theremin, backing vocals.
- Bob Torsello – bass
- RJ McCarty – keyboards, bass, guitar, saxophone, banjo, backing vocals
- Matthew Abourezk – drums

== History ==
In the late 1980s and early 1990s Joziah, Tink, and Sharkey were members of a progressive rock band called The Ancestors, which released three albums: The Ancestors (1988), The Enemies Dance (1991), and Brigadoon (1994).

The Ancestors had some degree of success but the band broke up in 1995, and they took a hiatus from the music industry. During that hiatus Joziah and Tink took courses in computer graphic design and video production at the Westchester Community College, SUNY and met Tony Zuzulo, who was one of their multi-media professors. In 1998 they formed The Circus and added Tony when they discovered that he was a drummer after class one day...

== Discography ==
Year	Title	Comments
1999	A Good Thief Tips His Hat	Studio recording
2000	Live from WDST - Acoustic Breakfast	Live recording. Out of print.
2000	Suddenly It's Christmas	CD single.
2001	Live at the Towne Crier	Live recording. Out of print, but available from iTunes.
2004	Flapjacks from the Sky	Studio recording
2005	A Night at the Puppet House	Live recording.
2005	The Christmas Show 2004	Live recording.
2005	Flapjacks from the Sky 12" vinyl	Studio recording
2006	"Flapjacks from the Sky" Concert DVD – Live at The Depot Theatre	Live DVD of a performance of the entire Flapjacks album
2007	Falcon Ridge Folk Festival, Hillsdale NY - July 21, 2006	Live recording.
2007	Roots on the River, Bellows Falls, VT - June 9, 2007	Live recording.
2007	Ancient Murphy Greatest Hits of the 20th Century	A collection of tracks by a previous incarnation of the band as The Ancestors.
2008	The Great Unravel	Studio recording
2008	A Very Slambovian Christmas	Live Recording
2010	The Circus Does Dylan	Live Recording
2011	The Grand Slambovians	Studio recording
2013	Folk!	Studio recording
2014	Box Of Everything	Compilation and one studio recording
2022	A Very Unusual Head	Studio recording
2026	13 - Live	Live Recording
