= Sharkey McEwen =

American musician

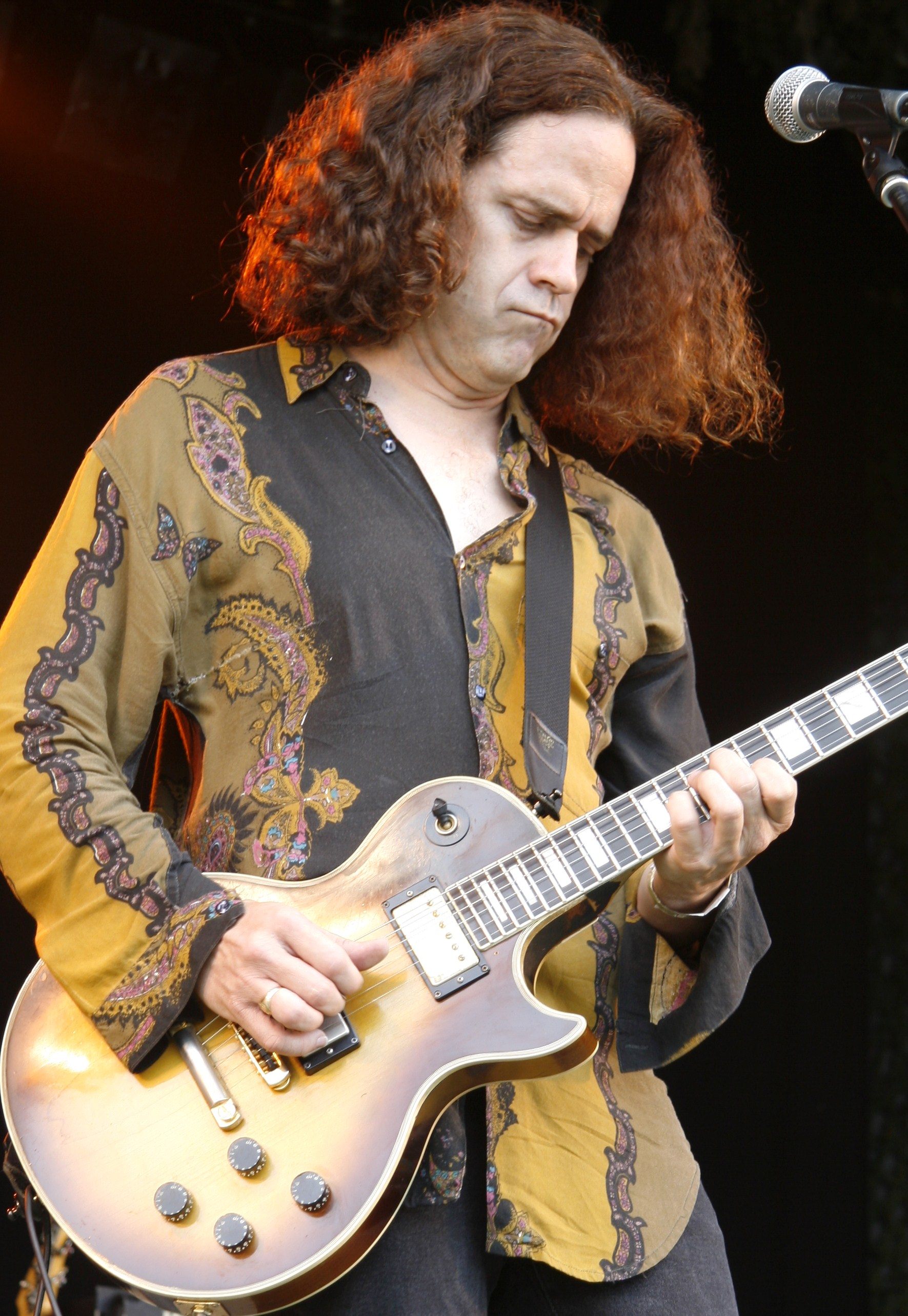
Sharkey McEwen

Mark "Sharkey" McEwen is an American, California-born musician and record producer, currently living in the Hudson Valley area of New York . He is the lead guitarist for the group The Slambovian Circus of Dreams, aka The Grand Slambovians, where he also plays mandolin and provides backup vocals.

== Biography ==
Born into a musical family, Mark "Sharkey" McEwen began learning to play the electric guitar from his older brother from the age of 11. In the mid to late 1970s, he performed in a number of rock groups around his home turf of northern California, and was performing professionally by the age of 17. In 1980 McEwen moved to Hollywood, CA and in 1981 was a founding member of the LA based group Boy along with Freddy Moore, who released the EP "Boy Next Door" in 1983. From 1985, McEwen took a few years off from music in pursuit of a deeper purpose. Shortly after moving to New York in 1990, Sharkey joined the New York City based hard rock group, The Ancestors, who released the album Brigadoon in 1994 which he co-produced. In 1998, Joziah Longo, Tink Lloyd, Tony Zuzulo and Sharkey McEwen formed the Hudson Valley-based group, Gandalf Murphy and the Slambovian Circus of Dreams, with whom he continues to perform. His son Ben McEwen plays with him from time to time performing at local venues under the name Sharkey & The Sparks.

== Discography ==
- Parasite - Boy (Film soundtrack) (1982)
- Next Door - Boy Radioactive Records (1983)
- Scarred (Film Soundtrack) - Boy (1984)
- The Ancestors - The Ancestors (1988)
- The Enemies Dance - The Ancestors (1991)
- Brigadoon (1994)
- Big Brown Sofa (session musician) - Pat McGuire Band (1997)
- Love Songs For Astronauts (musician, co-writer, co-producer) - Pat McGuire Band (2001)
- A Good Thief Tips His Hat - Gandalf Murphy and the Slambovian Circus of Dreams (1999)
- Live from the Puppet House - Gandalf Murphy and the Slambovian Circus of Dreams (1999) [out of print]
- Time of Wonder (Producer) - Stefan des Lauriers (1999)
- Live from WDST - Acoustic Breakfast - Gandalf Murphy and the Slambovian Circus of Dreams [out of print]
- Live at the Towne Crier - Gandalf Murphy and the Slambovian Circus of Dreams (2001)
- Stand (session musician) - The Kennedys (2003)
- Flapjacks from the Sky - Gandalf Murphy and the Slambovian Circus of Dreams (2004)
- Christmas at the Towne Crier - Gandalf Murphy and the Slambovian Circus of Dreams (2004)
- On A Night Before Christmas (Live) - Sloan Wainwright (with Gandalf Murphy and the Slambovian Circus of Dreams) (2005)
- A Night at the Puppet House - Gandalf Murphy and the Slambovian Circus of Dreams (2005)
- Flapjacks from the Sky 12" vinyl - Gandalf Murphy and the Slambovian Circus of Dreams (2005)
- Flapjacks from the Sky Live Concert DVD - Gandalf Murphy and the Slambovian Circus of Dreams (2006)
- Collected Works 2007 - Boy. General Records (2007)
- "Falcon Ridge Folk Festival" - Hillsdale NY - July 21, Live recording (2006)
- "Roots on the River", Bellows Falls, VT - June 9, Live recording (2007)
- "Ancient Murphy Greatest Hits of the 20th Century" A collection of tracks by a previous incarnation of the band as The Ancestors. (2007)
- "The Great Unravel" Gandalf Murphy and the Slambovian Circus of Dreams Studio recording (2008)
- "A Very Slambovian Christmas" Gandalf Murphy and the Slambovian Circus of Dreams Live Recording (2008)
- "The Grand Slambovians" Gandalf Murphy and the Slambovian Circus of Dreams Studio recording (2011)
- "Folk!" Gandalf Murphy and the Slambovian Circus of Dreams Studio recording (2013)
- "A Box Of Everything" Gandalf Murphy and the Slambovian Circus of Dreams Studio recording (2014)
