= Guandan =

Chinese card game

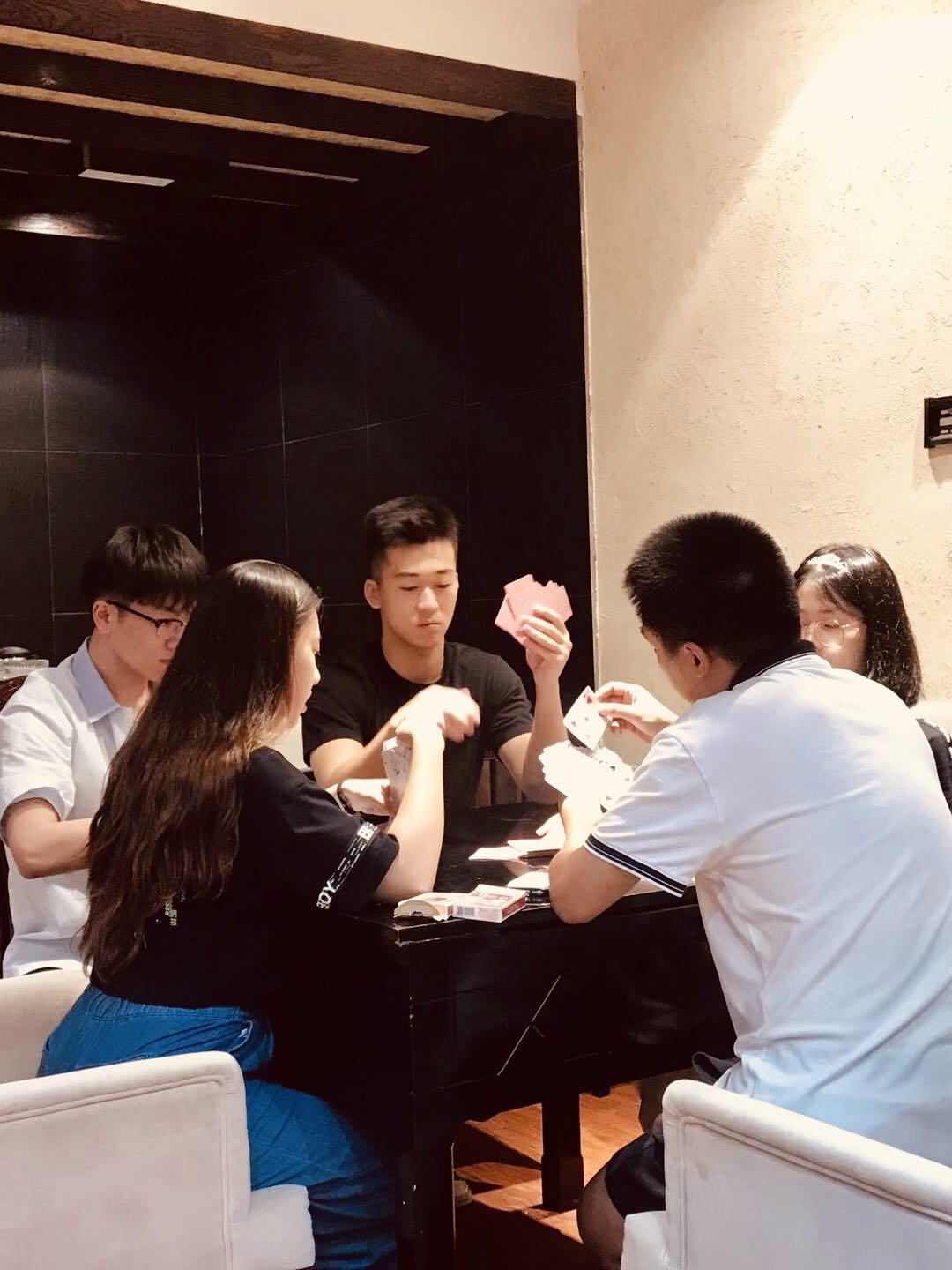
- People play Guandan in Nanjing in 2019
- Genres: Mind sport
- Players: 4
- Setup time: 30 seconds
- Playing time: Dependent on variation or rules
- Skills: Observation, Analysis, Memory, Strategies

Guandan is a shedding-type card game that originated in Jiangsu province, China.

The game is played by four players, in two teams (sitting across from each other).

A game consists of a series of hands. Each team has a level, starting at two and progressing (in the manner of a deck of cards) up to Ace. A team levels up from two to Ace by winning hands. Once a team has leveled up to Ace, they can win the game by winning the next hand.

A team wins a particular hand if one of their players is the first to discard all of their cards. Within a hand, discards are done across several tricks, and can only be done in specific sets.

== Etymology ==
The characters in Guandan (摜蛋/掼蛋) literally mean "Throwing Eggs". The second character is a homophone of the character 弹, meaning bomb, which is also suggested as an origin for the game's name. An alternative name for the game is Huai'an Running Fast (淮安跑得快), referencing the city where the game originated.

== History ==
Guandan was invented in Huai'an, Jiangsu in the 1960s. From there, it spread to neighboring cities of Huai'an such as Nanjing in the 1990s. In 2020, it was estimated that there were over 20 million people who played this game in the Jiangsu and Anhui provinces. Certain television channels have specific TV programs for Guandan, and certain websites contain online Guandan games.

Guandan
- Traditional Chinese: 摜蛋
- Simplified Chinese: 掼蛋
Transcriptions
Standard Mandarin
- Hanyu Pinyin: guàndàn

Alternative Chinese name
- Traditional Chinese: 淮安跑得快
- Simplified Chinese: 淮安跑得快
Transcriptions

== Rules ==
=== Cards and Player Setting ===
Guandan uses two decks of standard international cards, plus both Jokers, for a total of 108 cards in the deck. Therefore, each player will have 27 cards in each hand.

=== Card Ranks and Set Types ===
For comparing cards, Guandan (generally) ignores the suit. Cards are valued in ascending order from: 2-10, J, Q, K, A, Black Joker, Red Joker. Since two decks are shuffled together, there are eight of each card type 2->Ace, two Black Jokers, and two Red Jokers.

An exception to this is the Level Cards, discussed below.

==== Leadable Set Types ====
These sets can be led at the beginning of a trick. Other players can discard on top of this, but only if they follow with the same type of set in a higher rank.

Single card: Any single card
Pair: Two cards of the same number regardless of suit. A pair of Jokers must be of the same color.
Triple: "Three of a Kind", having the same number regardless of suit.
Plate: The plate is a combination of two consecutive triples. For example, three 4s and a three 5s.
Tube: The tube is three consecutive pairs. For example, a pair of 10s, a pair of Js and a pair of Qs.
Full House: The Full House is a triple and a pair. When comparing two Full Houses, we consider only the triplet.
Straight: Straight is five consecutive cards. Ace can be high or low. For example, the lowest-ranking straight is A, 2, 3, 4, 5 and the highest-ranking 10, J, Q, K, A.

Note: Players familiar with other card games (such as Poker) may be tempted to see this as a hierarchy (e.g.: Three of a Kind beats a Pair). This does not apply for this type of set. Each trick only involves one of the above set types, so it's more accurate to see this list as a menu of options to start a trick. However, the bombs listed below do constitute a hierarchy more familiar to Poker players.

==== Bomb Set Types ====
On a particular trick, a player may decide to override normal play by "throwing a bomb". Once a bomb is played, any subsequent plays on this trick must be a higher-level bomb. A "higher-level" bomb is either 1) a bomb of the same type, but with higher card values, or 2) a bomb of a higher type. The bomb types, in ascending order, are:

Set of 4 or 5 matching cards: This bomb represents a set of 4 or 5 cards of the same value, regardless of suit. A set of 5 cards is always higher than one of 4 cards.
Straight Flush: Straight flush is a straight with all cards of the same suit.
Set of 6 or more matching cards: This is a set of 6 or more cards of the same value, regardless of suit. The length of set could go as high as 10 with wild cards. As above, the value of the bomb is first calculated by the number of cards, then by the rank of the cards.
Joker Bomb: The Joker Bomb is all four jokers. It is regarded as the largest bomb in the game.

==== Level Cards and Wild Cards ====
===== Level Cards =====
Each hand has a level, which starts at 2 for the first hand. On subsequent hands, the level of the hand is the level of the team that has the Banker from the previous hand. The level can go up to Ace, as the teams level up.

The cards with the same value as the hand level become the Level Cards. Level Cards rank above Aces but below Jokers. For example, if the team that went out first on the previous hand leveled up to the Queen level, then Queens are the Level Cards and rank above an Ace.

Level cards cannot be played as their original value, except as part of a straight. For instance, on a level-2 hand, a set of 2-2-3-3-4-4 cannot be a Tube because the pair of 2s is no longer consecutive. However, a straight of A-2-3-4-5 is still valid.

====== Wild cards ======
The two Level Cards in hearts are wild. They can be played as any card (except Joker) to form a combination with other cards. However, when played as a single card they only count as normal level card.

For example, when the level of the hand is 7, the 7 of hearts can make a bomb when combined with three 8s, but as a single card it ranks above an Ace and below a Joker.

==== Glossary ====
English	Chinese	English	Chinese
Reporting Area (R)	报牌区	Single Card	单张
Playing Area	出牌区	Pair	对子
Fold Area	收牌区	Tubes	三连对
Tribute	贡牌	Triples	三同张
Level Card	级牌	Plates	钢板
Free Card	“逢人配”	Full Houses	三带二
Banker	上游	Straights	顺子
Follower	二游	Flush Straights	同花顺
Third	三游	Bombs	炸弹
Dweller	下游	Joker Bomb	天王炸
Double-Dweller	双下游		

=== Playing Guandan ===
==== Preparation ====
For the first hand, the deck is shuffled and placed face-down on the table. One of the players cuts the deck, draws a card and flips it face up. If it is not a joker, the players will decide who is going to draw cards first by counting counterclockwise from the player who draws the first card from the top of the pile. The player who draws the last card will open the play.

==== Playing a Hand ====
Players will play in counterclockwise order. The first player can play any type of set from their hand. As described above, other players must follow with the same type of set, or with a bomb. When a player does not wish to follow/bomb, they will declare a "Pass". When there are three passes in a row, the trick is finished. The player who made the last discard leads off a new trick, with the set type of their choosing.

Across a series of tricks, a player will eventually discard all the cards in their hand. The first to go out becomes the "Banker"; their team wins the hand, and will level up. However, in order to determine how many levels the winning team gains, play must continue until we know the 2nd player to go out ("Follower"), and possibly also the third ("Third") - and therefore the Dweller (or the Double-Dweller).

In continuing play, if the player who made the last discard now has no cards, the lead moves to their partner.

==== Reporting ====
A player who has ten or fewer cards in their hand must, upon being asked, declare how many cards remain in their hand.

==== Leveling Up ====
After a hand, the team with the Banker will level up. The number of levels that the team gains depends on the status of the other partner:

- If the partner is the Follower: the team gains 3 levels.
- If the partner is the Third: the team gains 2 levels.
- If the partner is the Dweller: the team gains 1 level.

Example of hand levels and leveling up
Hand	Team level		Hand Level (Level Cards)	Hand Result	Level up
Hand	A	B	Hand Level (Level Cards)	Hand Result	Level up
1	2	2	2	A has Banker + Follower	A +3
2	5	2	5	B has Banker + Third	B +2
3	5	4	4	A has Banker + Dweller	A +1

==== Subsequent Hands ====
When starting a new hand, the Dweller from the previous hand has the lead in the new hand. Note that the Dweller can be on either team. Whichever team has the Banker from the previous hand sets the level of the new hand for determining the Level Cards.

In a Double-Dweller case, the Dweller who paid the highest tribute (below) takes the lead.

==== Tribute ====
From the second hand onward, before play commences, the Dweller from the previous play will pay tribute to the Banker by offering the highest-ranked card in their hand (excluding hearts of the level card). The Banker will select any card from their hand with a rank not exceeding 10 to return to the Dweller. The Dweller will then open the play.

If a Double-Dweller occurs in the previous hand, both Dwellers will pay tribute the previous winning team. The Banker selects the tribute payer with the higher-ranked card, while the Follower selects the lower-ranked card, with corresponding returns.

If the tribute cards are of equal rank, tribute shall be paid clockwise, with corresponding returns.

When returning tribute, cards must be placed face down, but both tribute-givers will reveal their tribute cards. After the tribute return, the player who paid higher tribute would open the play.

If any Dweller holds both red jokers, the Dweller(s) do not have to pay tribute. In that case, the Banker would open the play.

==== Winning Conditions ====
A team that wins a hand after they've reached the Ace level wins the game. However, a team cannot win on a hand where one of the partners is the Dweller from the previous hand.

== Governmental crackdown in 2024 ==
According to an article published in The Guardian on August 24, 2024, guandan now appears to have fallen out of favor with the ruling Communist party, and it is blamed not only for encouraging a “passive attitude” towards work, but for supposedly encouraging the formation of cliques among party cadres. The report states that «A recent run of articles in the state-run Beijing Youth Daily described guandan as intoxicating and “decadent”, warning that it was “time to control the trend of ‘laying flat’ among all guandan players”. Laying flat (tangping in Chinese) is the term given to a social trend among young people who are rejecting high-pressure jobs for an easier lifestyle, which has alarmed authorities.» The effectiveness of the move, though, remains unclear because of the widespread opposition to this governmental criticism of guandan.
