= International Jump Rope Union =

World governing body for the sport of jump roping

The International Jump Rope Union (IJRU) is the highest authority and world governing body for the sport of jump roping and rope skipping.

== Background ==
The IJRU was created by a merger of the International Rope Skipping Federation and the World Jump Rope Federation. On July 12, 2021, It became the 10th International Federation to gain Observer status from the Global Association of International Sports Federations.

In March 2021, the IJRU and the Olympic Channel announced an agreement to broadcast and promote a series of jump rope events. The 2024 World Championship aired as part of ESPN8 The Ocho.

== Responsibility ==
To develop the sport of jump rope and rope skipping globally, the IJRU accredits regional jump rope unions across the world and organizes/regulates skipping events.
