= Look Ma, No Hands (book) =

2025 book

- Authors: Gabrielle Drolet
- Language: English
- Genre: Non-fiction, memoir
- Publication date: 2025
- Publication place: Canada

Look Ma, No Hands: A Chronic Pain Memoir is a 2025 memoir by Canadian writer Gabrielle Drolet.

== Overview ==
Gabrielle Drolet is a Canadian writer and cartoonist. She has had pieces published in a range of newspapers and magazines, including Teen Vogue, The Walrus, and The New Yorker.

In an interview with the CBC, Drolet stated that her hope for readers of her book was that they "laugh. I hope they learn something, and I hope people expand what they believe about chronic pain. For those who have chronic pain or who are disabled, I want my book to feel like you're hanging out with a friend, a source of companionship, to find solace."

== Critical reception ==
The CBC Books editors listed the book as one of the best Canadian non-fiction books published in 2025,

Aisling Murphy of The Globe and Mail reviewed the book as "impressive," saying that "Drolet’s writerly voice is funny, punchy and dry, and makes no assumptions about the reader holding the memoir in their hands." Hana Woodbridge of The Montreal Review of Books reviewed the book as "an earnest and intensely honest exploration of art and chronic pain... If you’re looking for a book that will have you laughing out loud while quietly reminding you that you’re not alone, this is it."
