= Dueball =

Sport

- Highest governing body: International Dueball Federation

Characteristics
- Contact: No
- Team members: 12
- Mixed-sex: Yes
- Type: Outdoor, Indoor
- Equipment: Football (indoor or turf football shoes)
- Venue: Dueball court

Presence
- Country or region: Worldwide
- Olympic: No
- Paralympic: No

Dueball is a team sport played between two teams of twelve players, originating from Nagpur, Maharashtra. It is a combination of different sports such as basketball, handball and football in addition to some variety of techniques. According to reports, there are no hard and fast rules to consider Dueball as an outdoor sport, and it can be played indoors as well as on beaches and turf grass. The sport is relatively new in the sporting context and it has a brief history as it was introduced in 2013.

== Format, rules and structure ==
Dueball court where the game Dueball would be played at

Dueball is played with a schedule of two periods consisting of 20 minutes each and with an interval of five minutes. A team consists of 12 players whereas 7 players have to play inside the ground. A team will be adjudged the winner based on the highest score and a team has to score Due (goal) within the Due Board.

== History ==
The sport was invented by former Indian national field hockey player Firoz Khan in Nagpur in 2013. In an exclusive interview, the coordinator for the Dueball Federation of India, Yuvraj Padole accredited the sport as "made in India". September 20 is officially marked as the World Dueball Day. The game has spread to over 25 countries with the collective efforts of the International Dueball Federation and Asian Dueball Federation.

Countries such as Sri Lanka, Bangladesh, Zimbabwe, Yemen, Indonesia have taken part at International Dueball Championships.
