= Lucy Nulton =

American educator (1903–2000)

- Lucy Nulton, from the 1932 yearbook of East Carolina Teachers College
- Born: Lucian M. Nulton; June 18, 1903; Missouri, U.S.
- Died: November 23, 2000 (aged 97); Tallahassee, Florida, U.S.
- Occupation(s): Educator, folklorist

Lucy M. Nulton (June 18, 1903 – November 23, 2000) was an American educator. She taught at East Carolina Teachers College, and worked at the P. K. Yonge Laboratory School at the University of Florida.

== Early life and education ==
Nulton was born in Missouri, the daughter of John Nulton and Letha Ellen Jackson Nulton. She graduated Peabody College in Tennessee in 1928, and earned a master's degree from Teachers College, Columbia University in 1933.

== Career ==
Nulton was on the faculty at East Carolina Teachers College in the 1930s and 1940s. She was second vice-president of the North Carolina Association for Childhood Education. In the 1950s and 1960s, she was a teacher and researcher at the P. K. Yonge Laboratory School at the University of Florida. She was first vice-president of the Alachua County Association for Childhood Education. She was named Gainesville's Teacher of the Year in 1960.

Nulton also played violin, and was a member of the University of Florida Symphony Orchestra. She took a particular interest in children's songs and rhymes, especially those used in jumping rope.

== Publications ==
Nulton was a "prolific" academic writer, and her research appeared in scholarly journals including Peabody Journal of Education, The North Carolina Teacher, Childhood Education, The High School Journal, Educational Leadership, The Journal of American Folklore, and Elementary English.

- "Analyzing and criticizing student teaching in the early elementary grades" (1928)
- "Elementary Child's Play Educative If It Is Supervised" (1930)
- "'Churn, Butter, Churn': A Project from Live-at-Home Week" (1930)
- "Science interests and questions of a second grade" (1930)
- "A comparison of the science interests of two successive second grades" (1930)
- "A Second Grade Experience with Blackboard Drawing" (1930)
- "The Practice of Democracy in Our Public Schools" (1942)
- "Jump Rope Rhymes as Folk Literature" (1948)
- "What should I do about him?: That Silent One" (1952)
- "Adult-Made Time: In which the Child Must Learn to Live" (1953)
- "Eight-Year-Olds Tangled in Charlotte's Web" (1954)
- "A Classroom for Living" (1954)
- "Continuing Curiosity Develops Concepts" (1954)
- "From Manuscript to Cursive--How" (1957)
- "A Loosened Spirit" (1957)
- "Listen! the Children!" (1961, with Lena Rexinger)
- "Environments Today that Invite Learning" (1962)
- "'… but the Children Just Love it!'" (1965)

== Personal life ==
Nulton died in 2000, at the age of 97, in Tallahassee, Florida.
