= Flapjacks from the Sky =

Studio album by Gandalf Murphy and the Slambovian Circus of Dreams
- Released: 2004
- Studio: Sleepy Hollow Studios
- Genre: Folk rock, psychedelia
- Length: 46:23 (Disc 1); 53:25 (Disc 2)
- Label: High Noon
- Producer: Joziah Longo; Sharkey McEwen

Gandalf Murphy and the Slambovian Circus of Dreams chronology
| Live at the Towne Crier (2001) | Flapjacks from the Sky (2004) | A Night at the Puppet House (2004) |

Flapjacks from the Sky is the second studio album by American folk rock group Gandalf Murphy and the Slambovian Circus of Dreams released on High Noon Records in 2004.

== Recording and production ==
The album was recorded at Sleepy Hollow Studios in New York City and produced by band members Sharkey McEwen and Joziah Longo. McEwen also performed the engineering, mixing and mastering. The band started recording the album in late 2001.

== Critical reception ==
Professional ratings
Review scores
| Source | Rating |
|---|---|
| AllMusic | 4/5 stars |

Soon after its release, radio exposure for the album was nearly nationwide in the United States.

Thom Jurek of AllMusic called the album sophisticated, mature, poetic, and funny in a tasteful, nonzany—or obvious—way. He said that despite the album's length, "time flies by" while listening to it. Jurek praised Joziah Longo's songwriting as superior to that of Tom Petty whose voice his resembles. He also lauded Sharkey McEwen as "a bloody natural lead guitarist who never overplays". Jurek called Tink Lloyd, who plays cello, piccolo, flute and accordion, a "musician's musician".

== Track listing ==
All songs written by Joziah Longo.

=== Disc one ===
1. "Rocket" – 3:26
2. "Sunday in the Rain" – 4:41
3. "Kiss from Eve" – 3:24
4. "Moondog House" – 3:42
5. "Baby Jane" – 5:26
6. "I Wish" – 2:45
7. "Better Life" – 3:30
8. "Living with God" – 3:47
9. "Talkin' to the Buddha" – 9:43
10. "Big Eight Wheeler" – 5:54

=== Disc two ===
1. "Jump-Rope" – 3:42
2. "Bike" – 5:20
3. "Glide" – 4:06
4. "Gonna Get Up" – 1:53
5. "In Her Own World" – 4:16
6. "Sullivan Lane" – 4:29
7. "Look Ma No Hands" – 4:15
8. "Fumes" – 4:56
9. "Call to the Mystic" – 6:00
10. "Flapjacks from the Sky" – 7:11
11. "Nighttime (Ancient Murphy Bonus Track)" – 4:50
12. "The Yodel Song" (hidden track) - 2:21

== Personnel ==
=== Gandalf Murphy and the Slambovian Circus of Dreams ===
- Joziah Longo – vocals, acoustic and electric guitars, bass, harmonica, jaw harp
- Tink Lloyd – accordion, cello, flute, piccolo, vocals
- Sharkey McEwen – electric, acoustic and slide guitars, bass, mandolin, keyboards, vocals
- Tony Zuzulo – drums, percussion, glockenspiel

=== Guest artists ===
- Alistair Farrant – organ, piano, harpsichord (on "Look Ma No Hands", "Fumes" and "Flapjacks from the Sky")
- Kolson Pickard – cornet (on "Call to the Mystic")
- Bob Muller – drums (on "Nighttime")
