= VX (sport) =

Ball sport from the United Kingdom

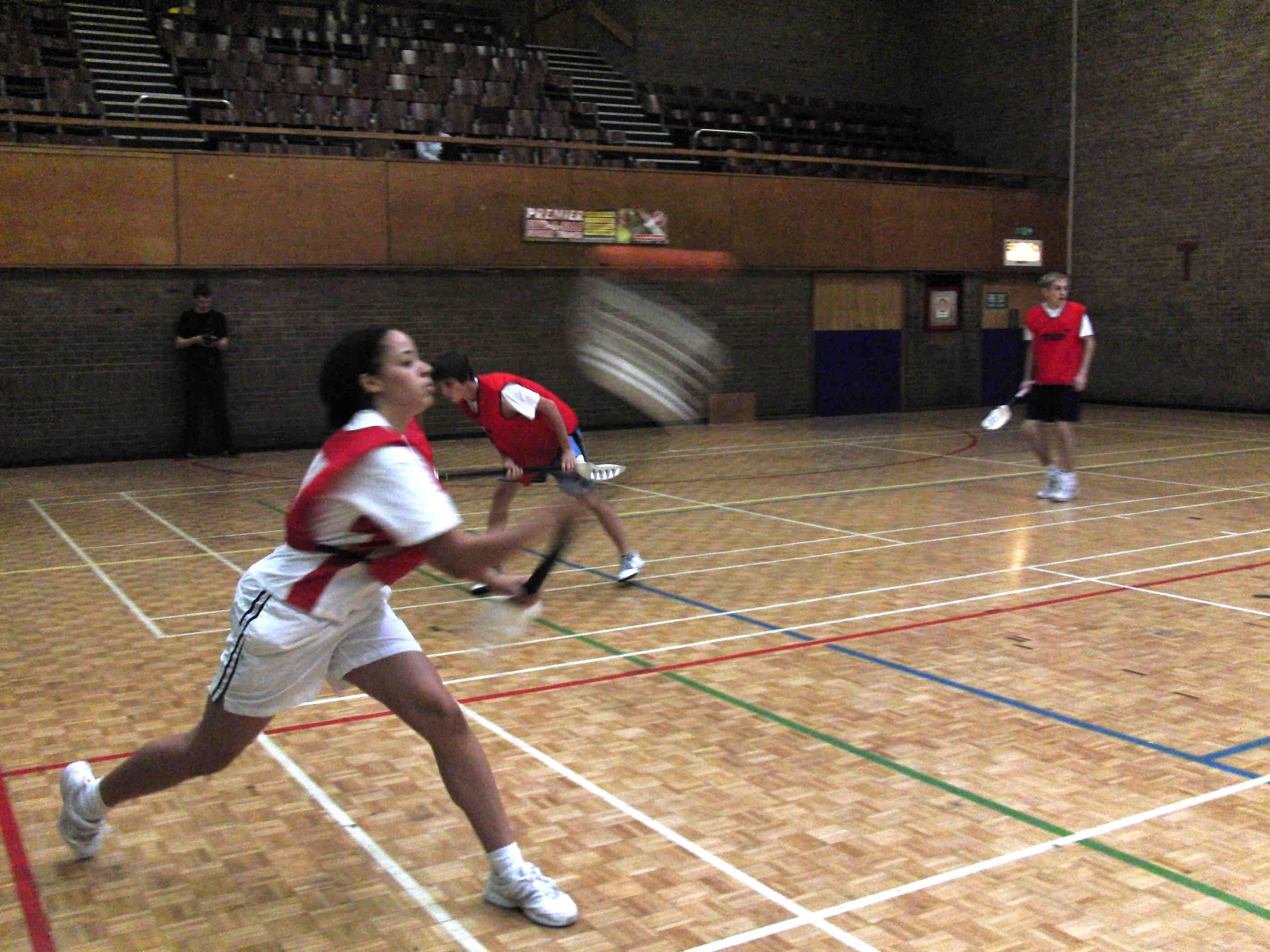
- Highest governing body: Global VX
- First played: 2006

Characteristics
- Contact: No
- Team members: Singles (V2), 1v1v1 (V3), Doubles (V4), Team (5v5, VX)
- Mixed-sex: yes
- Type: Hand sport, Ball sport, Team sport
- Equipment: Low-pressure, low-impact VX ball; VstiX

VX, originally Rock-It-Ball, is a ball sport from the United Kingdom. It developed in North Yorkshire, England, and was launched in February 2006 at the Youth Sport Trust's Sports Colleges Conference. In 2012 the sport's international federation, now called Global VX, renamed it VX to suit its international growth.

The sport is played in schools in the UK and has been taken up by universities, youth organisations, StreetGames and the military. Global VX says that it is played in 25 countries, 15 of which have national governing bodies.

VX is played by men and women on equal terms in all disciplines. It is not an adaptation of a single sport but draws on elements of dodgeball, lacrosse, basque pelota and hockey.

== History ==
Rock-It-Ball spread through schools in the UK. It featured in four Youth Sport Trust programmes and was played regularly in 17 countries, and an international federation and eleven national governing bodies were set up. The federation was established in December 2006. In 2012 it renamed the sport VX, and clubs and national bodies followed, so that leagues and tournaments now run under the VX name.

In August 2017 the sport was recognised at the General Assembly of the Sport Recognised Association.

== Rules ==
VX is played by two teams of five players on a court about the size of a sports hall with four badminton courts. Each player carries a VstiX, a control bar with a thrower/catcher at each end, and can move anywhere on court. Five balls are in play. Players must dribble by rolling the ball between the two ends of the VstiX or by bouncing it on the floor with one end.

A player scores one point by hitting an opponent with the ball between the shoulders and the feet, and three points by catching an opponent's thrown ball. A player who is hit stands still and raises a hand until the referee records the point. Two umpires assist the referee by watching for infringements, each of which costs three points. Violence leads to ejection and disciplinary action. Infringements include:

- failing to acknowledge a hit
- picking up a ball while waiting to play on after being hit ("fishing")
- travelling: a player may take two steps and must then dribble
- striking the ball or a player with the VstiX
- illegal contact, such as deliberately barging an opponent
- knocking the ball out of an opponent's VstiX
- swearing

Formal matches have four quarters of four minutes each.

== Versions ==
The federation introduced three further versions to develop the sport and let individuals set up clubs more easily:

- V2 (singles) is played by two players with three balls on a squash court, in two halves of four minutes.
- V3 is played by three players, each playing alone, with four balls on a squash court. The winner concedes the fewest points. Games last two halves of four minutes.
- V4 (doubles) is played 2v2 with four balls on a squash court, in two halves of four minutes.

== Federation ==
Global VX was established in December 2006 as the International Federation and took its present name when the sport was renamed in 2012. It supports national governing bodies and organises international competition. Its rules committee meets every January.

== Recognition ==
In 2012 two players, Tom Hildreth and Helen Mackenzie, carried the Olympic torch. In 2013 the Easi-RockIts HellCats team won Team of the Year at the Minster FM Local Hero Awards.

The diver Jack Laugher was the sport's official ambassador from 2013.

== World championships ==
V2 (singles) World Champions and runners-up:

Year	Champion	Runner-up
2010	Carl Alsop	
2011	Scott MacMichael (Scotland)	
2012	Tom Hildreth (England)	Scott MacMichael (Scotland)
2013	Tom Hildreth (England)	Scott Snowdon (England)
2014	Jack Brown (England)	Carl Alsop (England)
2015	Scott Snowdon (England)	Carl Alsop (England)
2016	Scott Snowdon (England)	Tom Hildreth (England)
2017	Scott Snowdon (England)	Tom Hildreth (England)
2018	Tom Hildreth (England)	Dan Raper (England)
2019	Scott Snowdon	Tom Hildreth
2023	Tom Hildreth	Ka Lok

The V2 World Championships were cancelled in 2020, 2021 and 2022 because of the COVID-19 pandemic. In the team World Cup, Scotland won in 2007 and 2011, with England runners-up in both years. England won the VX World Championships in 2015 (runners-up India) and 2019.

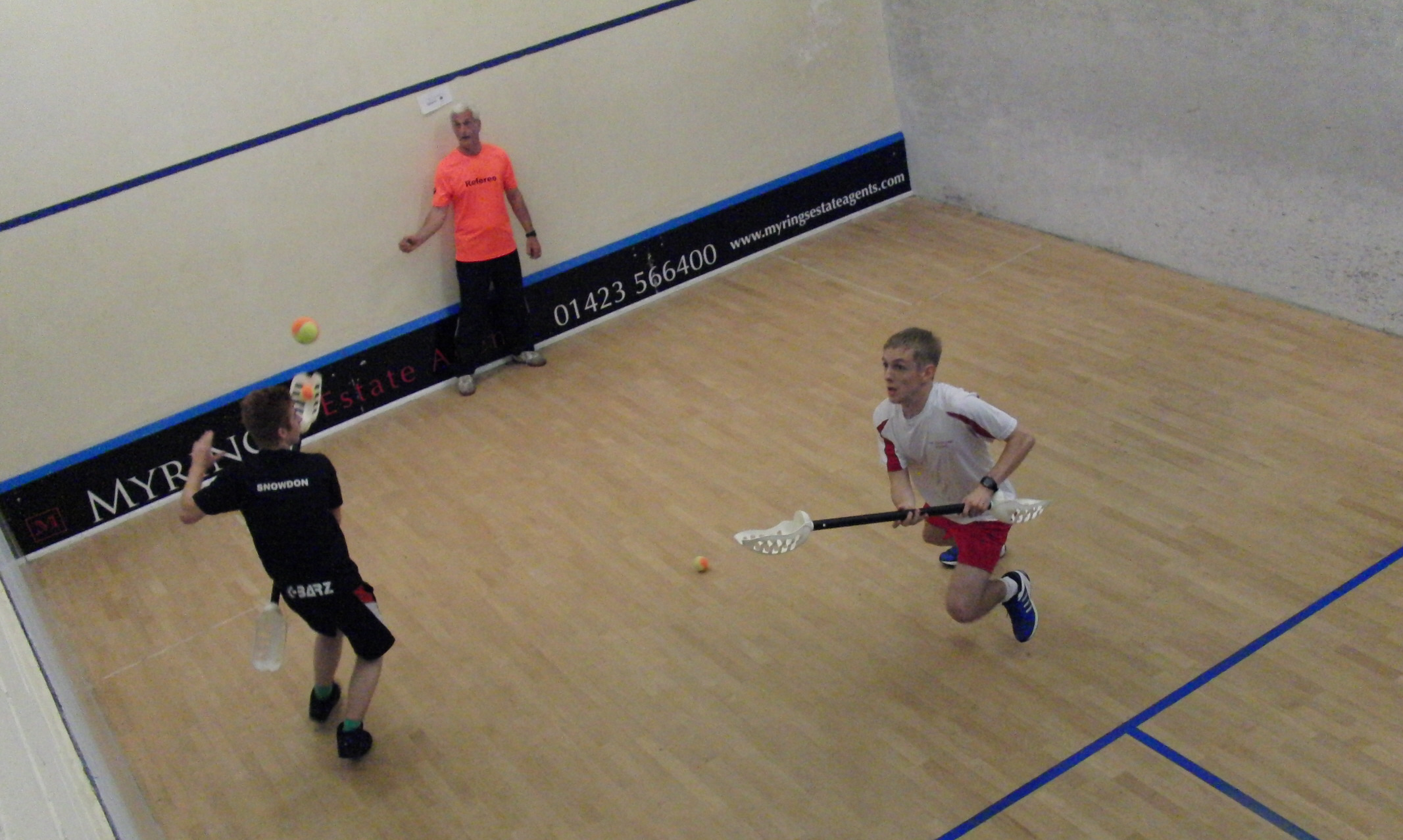
Tom Hildreth in the 2013 V2 World Cup final
