= Chinese jump rope =

Children's game

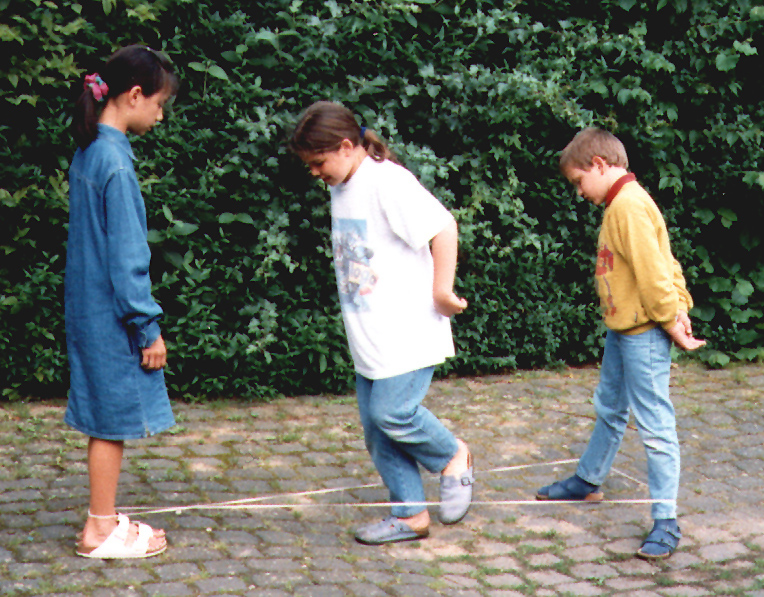
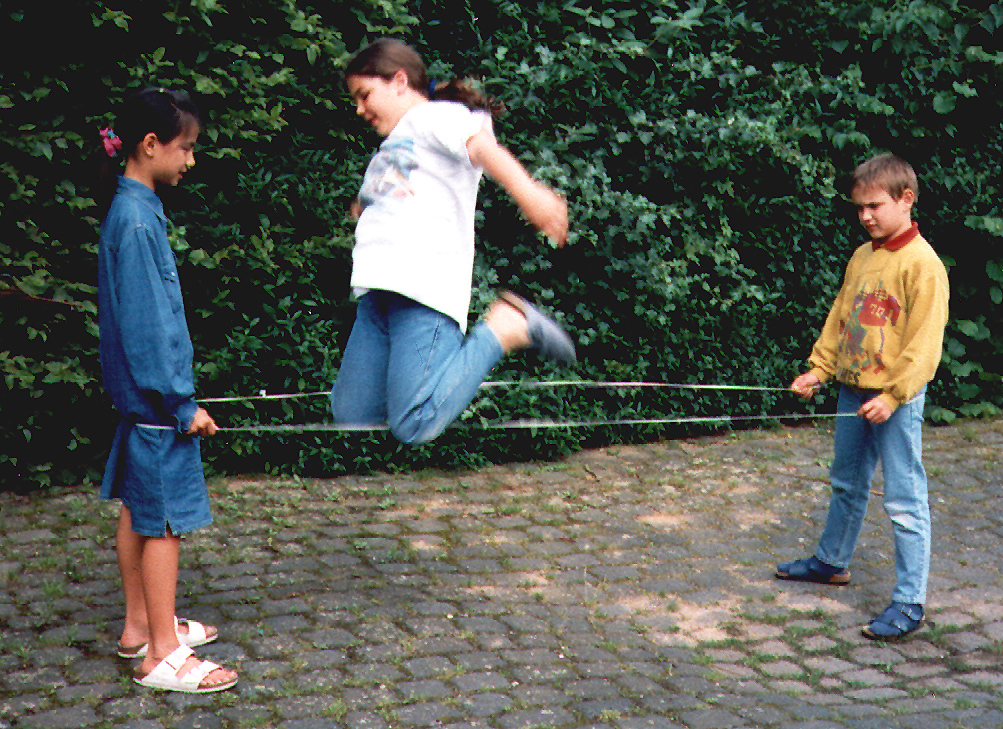
Chinese jump rope being played.

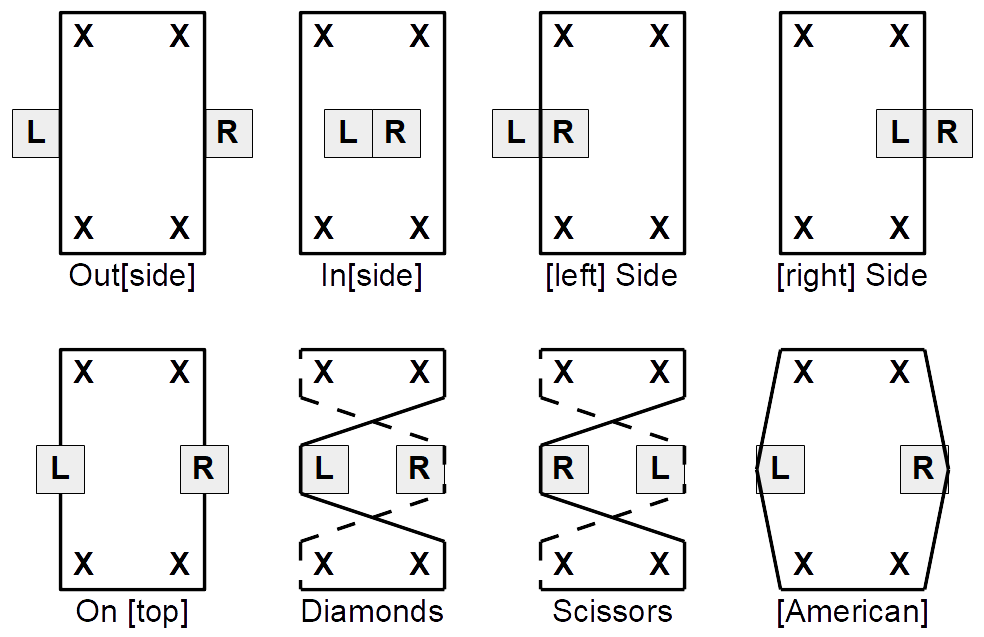
Moves or positions

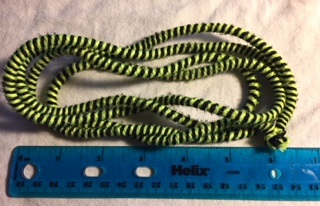
Coiled elastic rope

Chinese jump rope is a children's game resembling hopscotch and jump rope. Various moves (creation of positions or figures) are combined to create patterns which are often accompanied by chants.

The game has spread around the world and as such has many alternative names that vary with regions: Chinese ropes, jumpsies, elastics (British English: Australia, New Zealand, Great Britain), rek (South Africa), yoki (Canada), Super Cali (Newfoundland), French skipping, American ropes/Chinese ropes (in Scotland), and Chinese garter in the Philippines. Some notable names for the game in languages other than English include Chinese: 跳皮筋; pinyin: tiàopíjīn, Japanese: "Rubber Jumping" (ゴムとび, gomutobi), German: gummitwist, and French: "jeu de l elastique".

The game is typically played by three or more players using a string of rubber bands that has been tied into a circle, usually at least six feet long ("approximately 2 feet in diameter"), or an elastic rope. Two of the participants (the holders) face each other several feet apart, and position the string around their ankles so that it is taut. The third player (the jumper) stands between the two sides of the rope and must accomplish a series of increasingly difficult moves without making an error. The position of the string is raised as the jumper moves through the levels, from ankle to waist height and higher. "They are great for stretching. Often a child gets so intrigued with the shapes the rope can make that [the child] stretches much harder than [the child] would have otherwise."

== Moves, patterns, and chants ==
"Americans" pattern The names of the moves may be chanted: "Right, left, right, left, in, out/open, in, on"

"Diamonds" pattern (the letters spelling "Diamonds" are chanted)

"Sailboats" pattern

In this game, the two ends of the rope are tied together so that the rope forms a circle. The two end children stand inside this 'circle' and place it at ankle level, standing just far enough apart so that the rope is held taut between them. The jumper must perform several tasks requiring various degrees of agility in this particular game.

Instead of swinging the rope, the ends of the rope are tied together to form a loop. (Instead of using a regular jump rope, you can use a Chinese jump rope that is made of a stretchy material, sort of like a large rubber band.) The two enders stand with the rope around their ankles, forming a rectangular shape with the rope...If you get through all these steps without missing or stepping on the rope, the game gets harder. The enders move the rope up...The better you do, the higher you have to jump.

The game begins with choosing the jump pattern to follow and with the holders holding the rubberband around their ankles. There are many jump patterns and most are accompanied by a song. This is sometimes called the "first-level". The jumper tries to complete the chosen pattern. If the moves are completed successfully, then the rope is moved farther up and the series is repeated. When the rope gets too high for a normal person to jump over it, the player then kneels and uses his or her hands instead. Some people just stop the game at this point, as the game is much easier when using hands. If the jumper makes a mistake, players rotate their positions and the next player becomes the jumper. Once the player is finished, that person switches with one of the other people, and so on, until everyone has been able to play.

The moves involve jumping and repositioning the feet in some manner. Some of the more common moves are jumping so that both feet land outside the rope, both are inside the rope, one is inside and one is outside, or both are on top of the rope. These moves are called "out" (it may be thought of as "straddling".), "in", "side", and "on" respectively, which the two other participants chant as the player executes them. Some other, less common, moves involve manipulating the rope. A "pull" is when the jumper carries a side of the rope with one's foot or feet, generally crossing it over the other side. Crossing the ropes with one's legs in between them is "diamonds". One of these moves, called "scissors", is executed by starting with both feet outside the rope and then crossing the legs, with the ropes in tow, so that a formation resembling a pair of scissors is formed. The pattern "Chinese" features:

Chinese pattern
Step #	Step name	#	Name	#	Name	#	Name	#	Name
1, 3, 5	Inside	8, 10, 12	R side	15, 17, 19	Out	22, 24, 26	L on/R out	29	Out
2, 4, 6	Out	9, 11, 13	L side	16, 18, 20	On	23, 25, 27	R on/L out	30–36	On
7	Inside	14	R side	21	Out	28	L on/R out	37	Out

There are many variations of the game that are played. Sometimes the rope is crisscrossed so that it makes an X, and the player must move his or her feet into different sections of the X in some pattern. Instead of simply raising the rope, some players create a procession of "levels", similar to a video game, that the player must complete before winning the game. When a player returns to jumping, they continue the game from the last uncompleted level. The player that first completes the levels (usually five to nine, up to neck height) wins the game. These levels often have specific names, such as the "roller coaster," which is a crisscrossed rope that is higher at one end than the other. There is a pattern known as "American" and one known as "the Name Game".

There are many rhymes used when playing, for example

"England, Ireland, Scotland, Wales
Inside, outside
Inside on" (also "Puppy dogs' tails")

Several counting chants are used, such as:

Old Mrs Mason broke her basin
On the way to London Station.
How much did it cost?
One, two, three, four.[..]

and

Charlie Chaplin sat on a pin
How many inches did it go in?
One, two, three, four.[..]

as well as

Cinderella, dressed in yella (yellow) went upstairs to kiss a fella (fellow) she made a mistake and kissed a snake how many doctors did it take? one, two, three, four... (circa 4th grade, 2004, California, USA)

The following pattern is from the Keystone Folklore Quarterly (1966):

No rhyme; The two ends of the rope are tied together to form a circle. The two 'end' children step into this circle, hold it up above the ground at a height of about six inches and stand as far apart as possible so that the rope is taut between them, going around the back of their ankles.
Step 1: The jumper begins by standing with her side to the oval. She puts one foot into the center, without touching either side of the rope, and touches the ground with her toe. She then removes her foot, places it under the rope closest to her and over the second side so that the first side of the rope crosses the second side. She repeats this motion five times, then changes sides and repeats the whole action.
Step 2: For the second step the rope must be raised to the jumper's knee level—or just below it. The jumper begins by standing in the center of the oval. She jumps and throws her feet outside the oval on either side of the ropes. Then she jumps and brings her feet back into the oval. This is repeated five times, facing each direction (front and back).
Step 3: In the third step, the rope must be fixed so that one side is higher than the other. The jumper faces the rope, jumps into the center (over the lower side), then across the higher side. She then repeats this action in reverse (jumping backward over the rope). This is repeated five times.
Step 4: Rope in the position of Step 1—this time the action is performed with the jumper's hands, instead of her feet.
Step 5: Rope is in the position of Step 2: jumper touches the ground with hands as she jumps.
Step 6: Rope is in the position of Step 3; jumper repeats the action of Step 3, but with hands touching the ground as she jumps.
Any miss in the steps requires the jumper to start over!

=== German chants ===
- "Hau-Ruck": Hau Ruck Donald Duck Micky Maus Mitte Raus (trans.: Jerk Chuck, Donald Duck, Mickey Mouse, inside out)
- "Sahne": Sahne Sahne Mitte Grätsche Mitte Raus (trans.: Cream, cream, inside, outside, inside, out)
- "Däumling": Däumeling ist klein wie ein Daumen Raus (trans.: Tom Thumb is as small as a thumb-nail)
- "Zitronenschale": Zi-tro-nen-scha-le Raus (trans.: Le-mon, cit-rus, peel, out)
- "Schneewittchen": Schnee-witt-chen und die eins, zwei, drei, vier, fünf, sechs, sieben Zwerge Raus (trans.: Snow White along with the one, two, three, four, five, six, seven Dwarves, out)

== See also ==
- Tinikling
