= Skipping rope =

Game in which participants jump over a swung rope

Jump rope
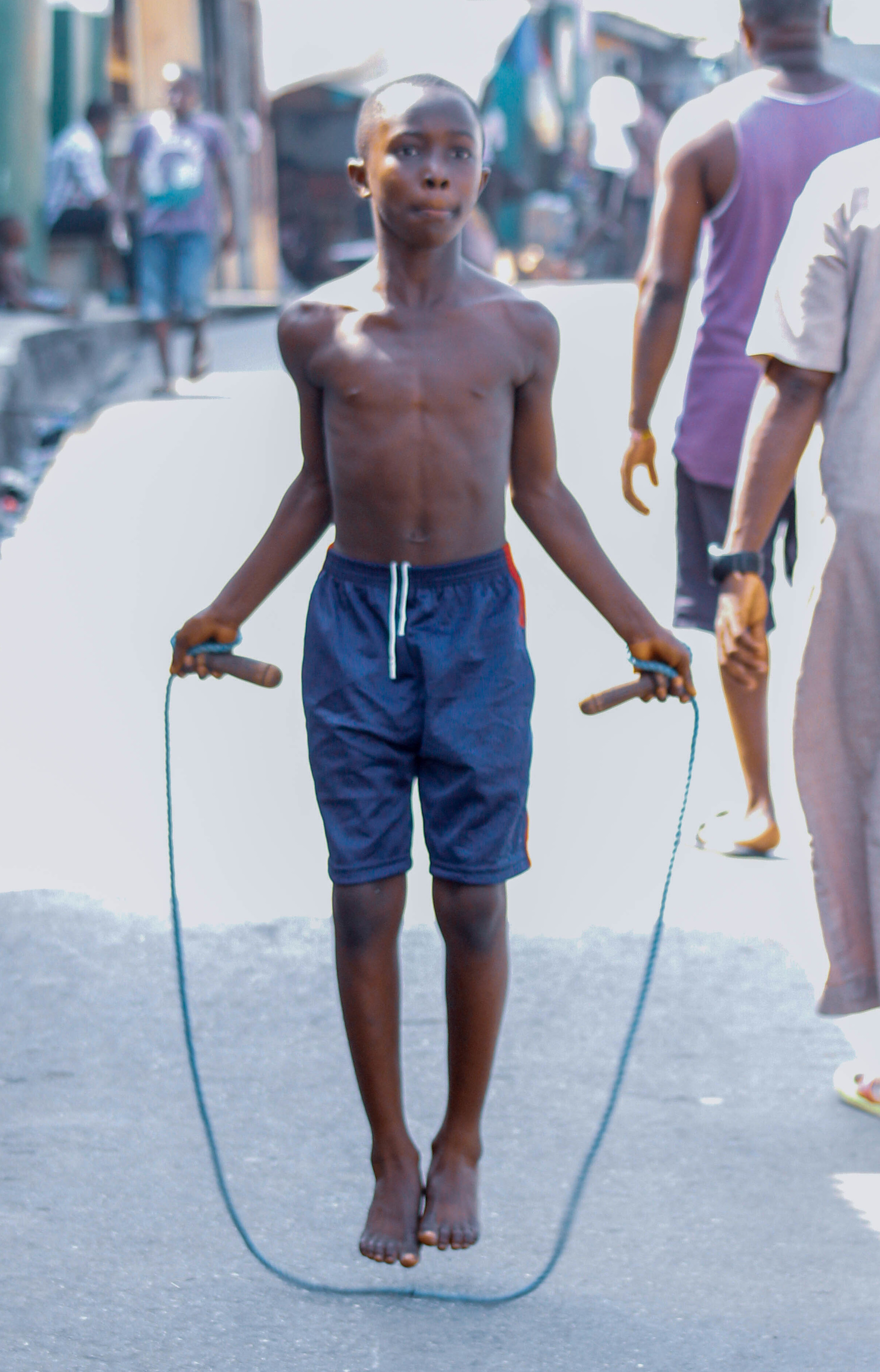
- A Ghanaian boy playing with a jump rope
- Type: toy
- Availability: Ancient times–present

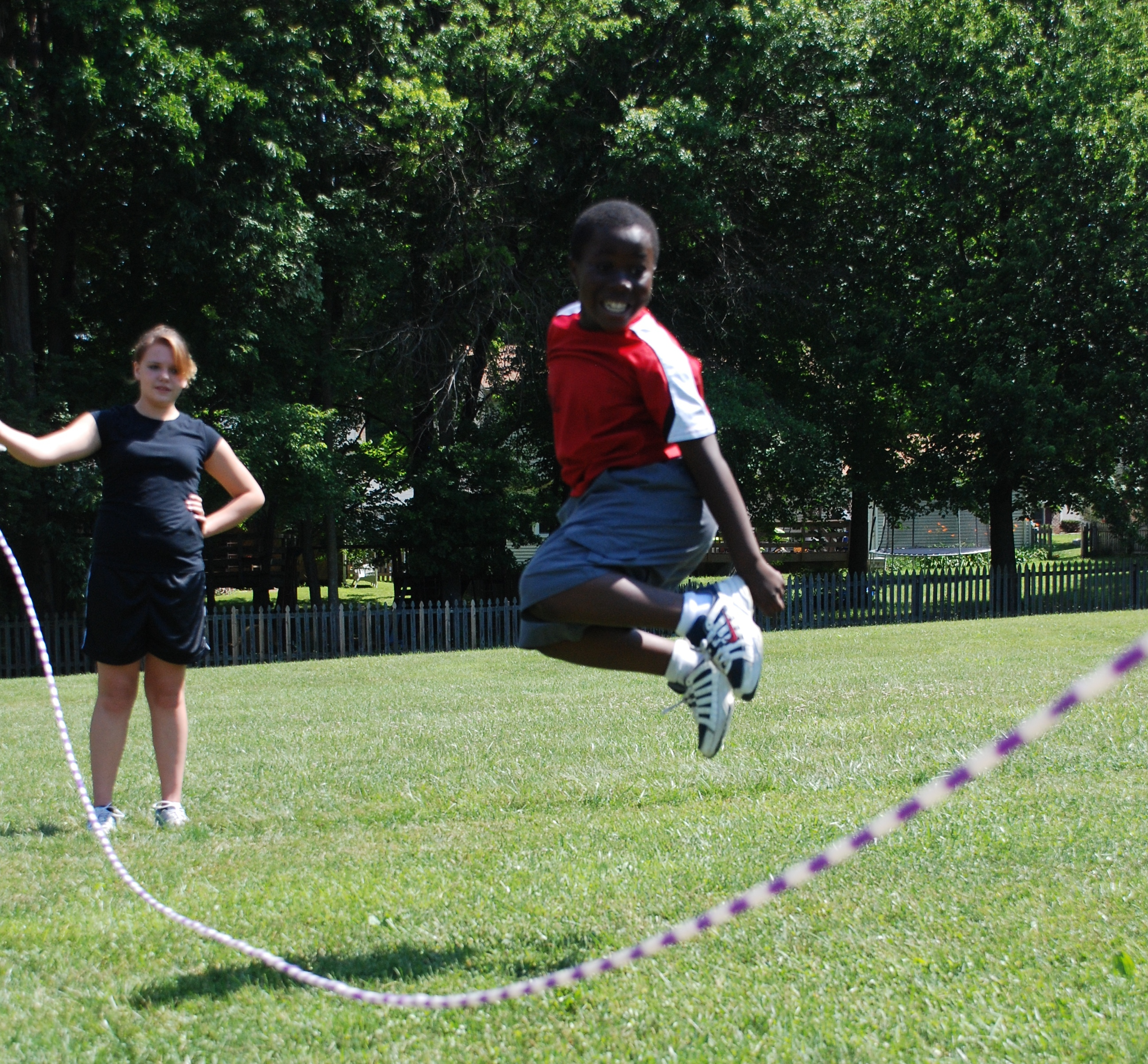
Boy jumping a long rope in Virginia

A child playing with a skipping rope in Japan

A skipping rope (or jump rope) is equipment used in sport and play that involves rhythmically jumping over a rope swung underfoot and overhead. The activity is practiced recreationally and competitively, with disciplines such as freestyle routines (featuring creative, combination techniques) and speed events (maximum jumps within timed intervals).

The activity has a long history across multiple cultures. Evidence of rope-skipping dates back to ancient China, where Han dynasty peoples practiced it as part of New Year celebrations, and to ancient Egypt, where children are depicted jumping over vines. In the 16th century, European explorers recorded vine-jumping activities among Indigenous peoples in Australia. Once treated as a gendered pastime with primarily boys skipping in Europe and America during the 16th and 17th century, it later became popular among girls beginning in the 18th century; by the 19th century, it had flourished in urban settings and children's street culture.

Today, skipping rope is widely used in fitness programs, gyms, and training for combat sports to improve cardiovascular endurance, coordination, rhythm, and footwork. The sport is also overseen internationally by organizations such as the International Jump Rope Union (IJRU), which organize competitions and standardize techniques.

== History ==
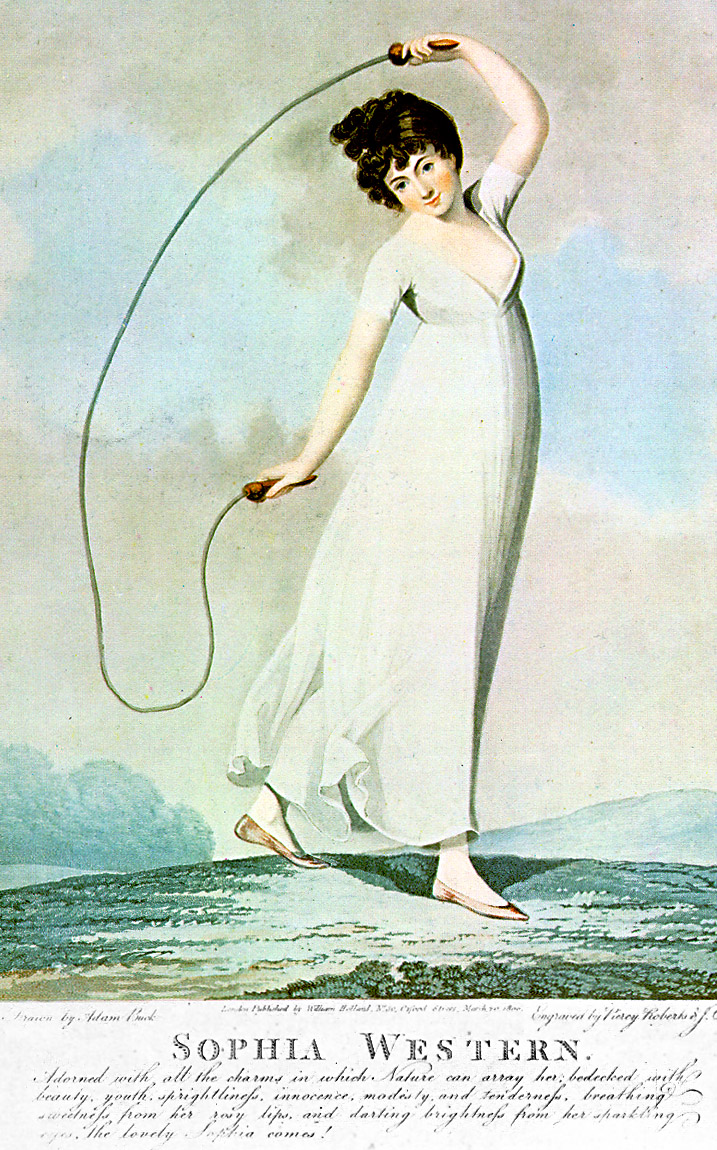
1800 illustration of a woman with a skipping rope

Skipping over rope has a long history across multiple cultures. While its earliest origins are unknown, there is evidence that the activity dates back to ancient China and Egypt. In China, rope‑skipping activities are depicted in Han Dynasty stone sculptures, and the game was known by various names in later dynasties. As an ancient Han folk sport, it served multiple purposes, including entertainment, leisure, and physical fitness. According to the Northeast Georgia History Centre, it was also part of an ancient Chinese New Year celebration, known as the "Hundred Rope Jumping" game (also called "Jumping 100 Threads").

Explorers reported seeing Australian aborigines jumping with vines in the 16th century. Within Europe and America, it was documented that it was primarily boys skipping in the 16th and 17th century. In many communities the activity was initially considered improper for girls, who were discouraged from exposing ankles; participation grew in the 18th century, along with the development of skipping-rope chants and games organized and led by girls, including rules about turn-taking and entry to play.

In the late-19th century in the United States, smooth sidewalks and dense neighborhoods made group play easier. In the mid-20th century, educator Lucy Nulton documented rhymes that American children chanted or sang while jumping rope.

During the COVID-19 pandemic (2020–2023), as gyms closed and lockdowns kept people in their homes, skipping gained popularity as a space-efficient home workout.

== Techniques ==
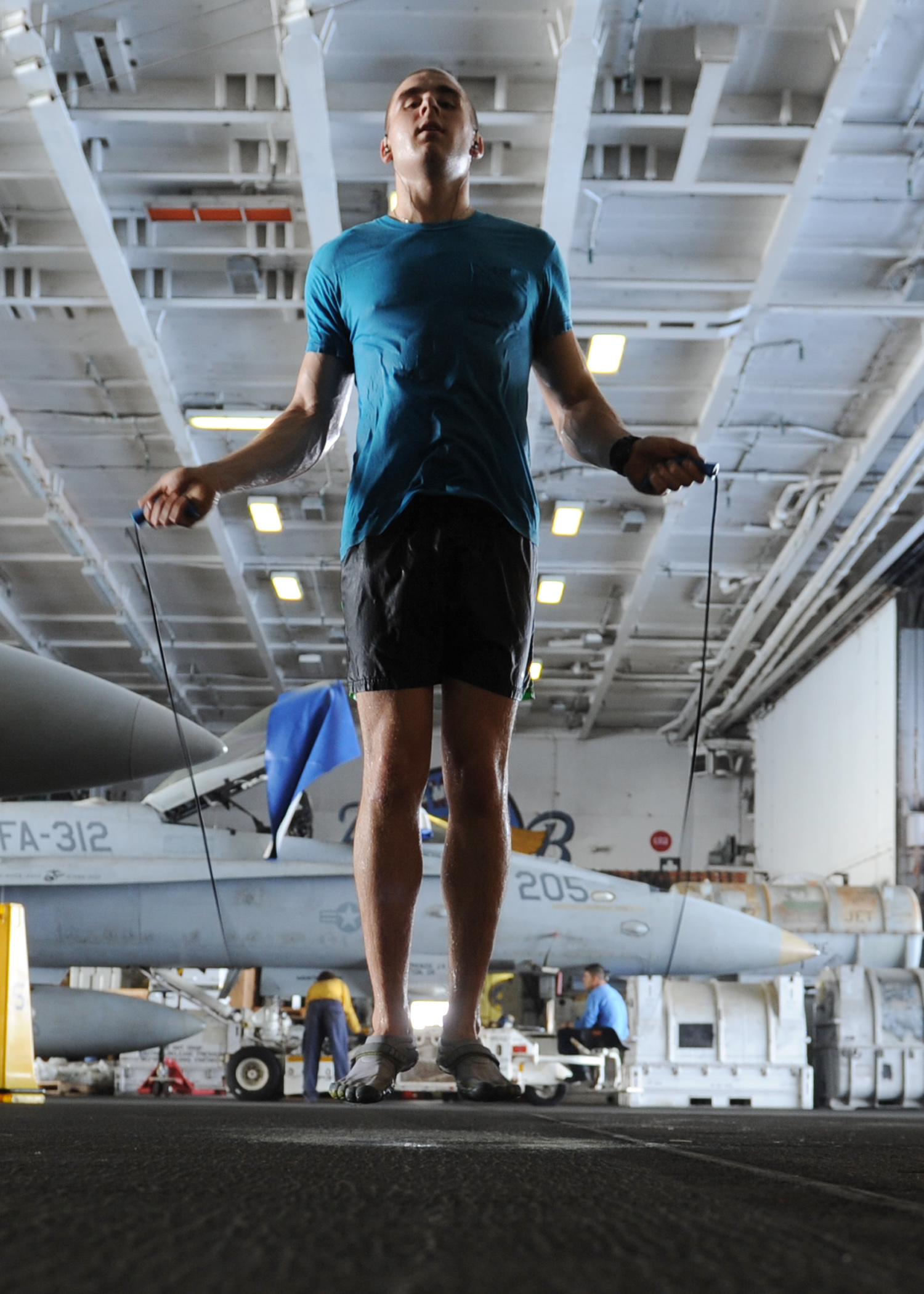
Basic jump technique

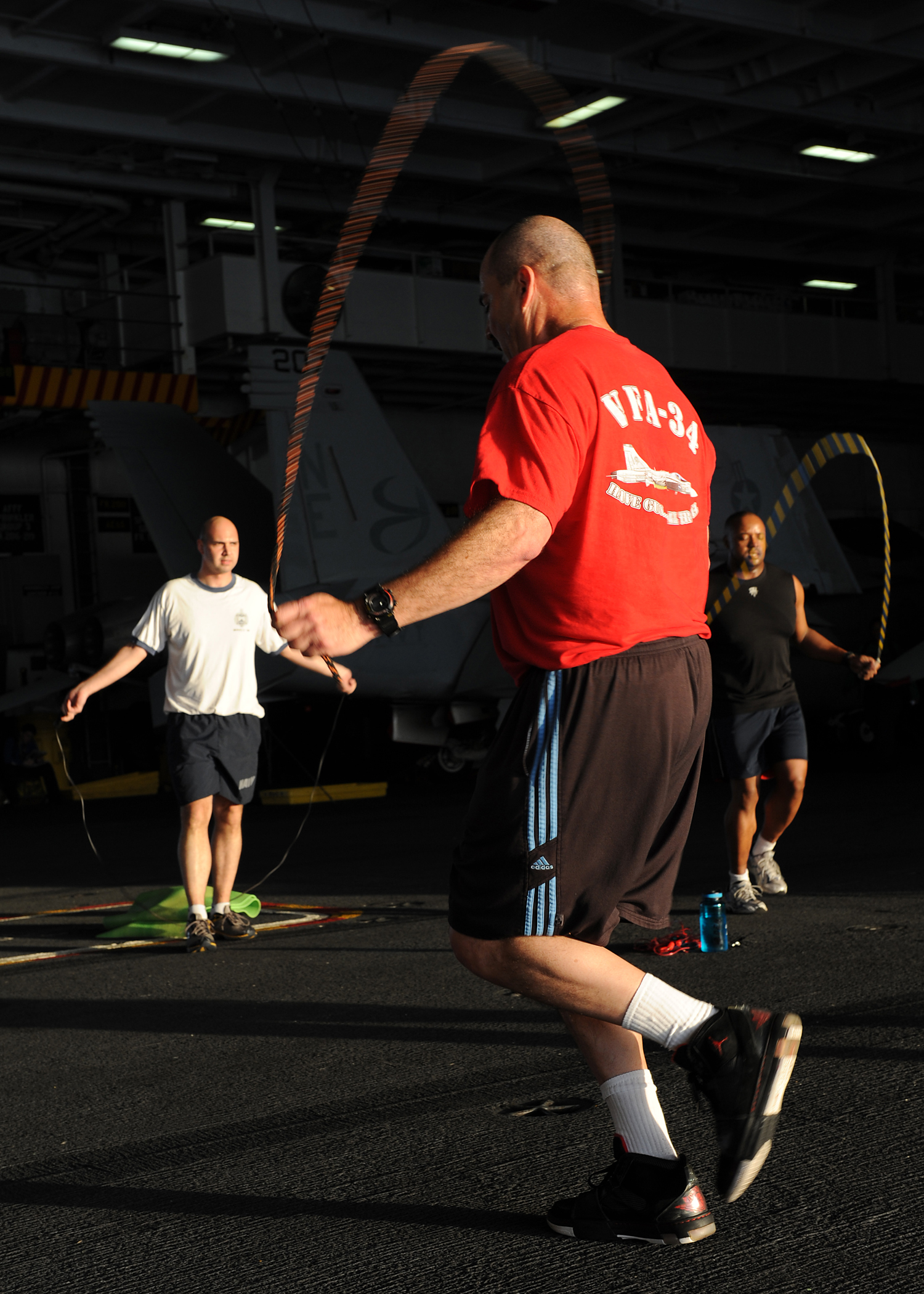
Alternate foot jump technique

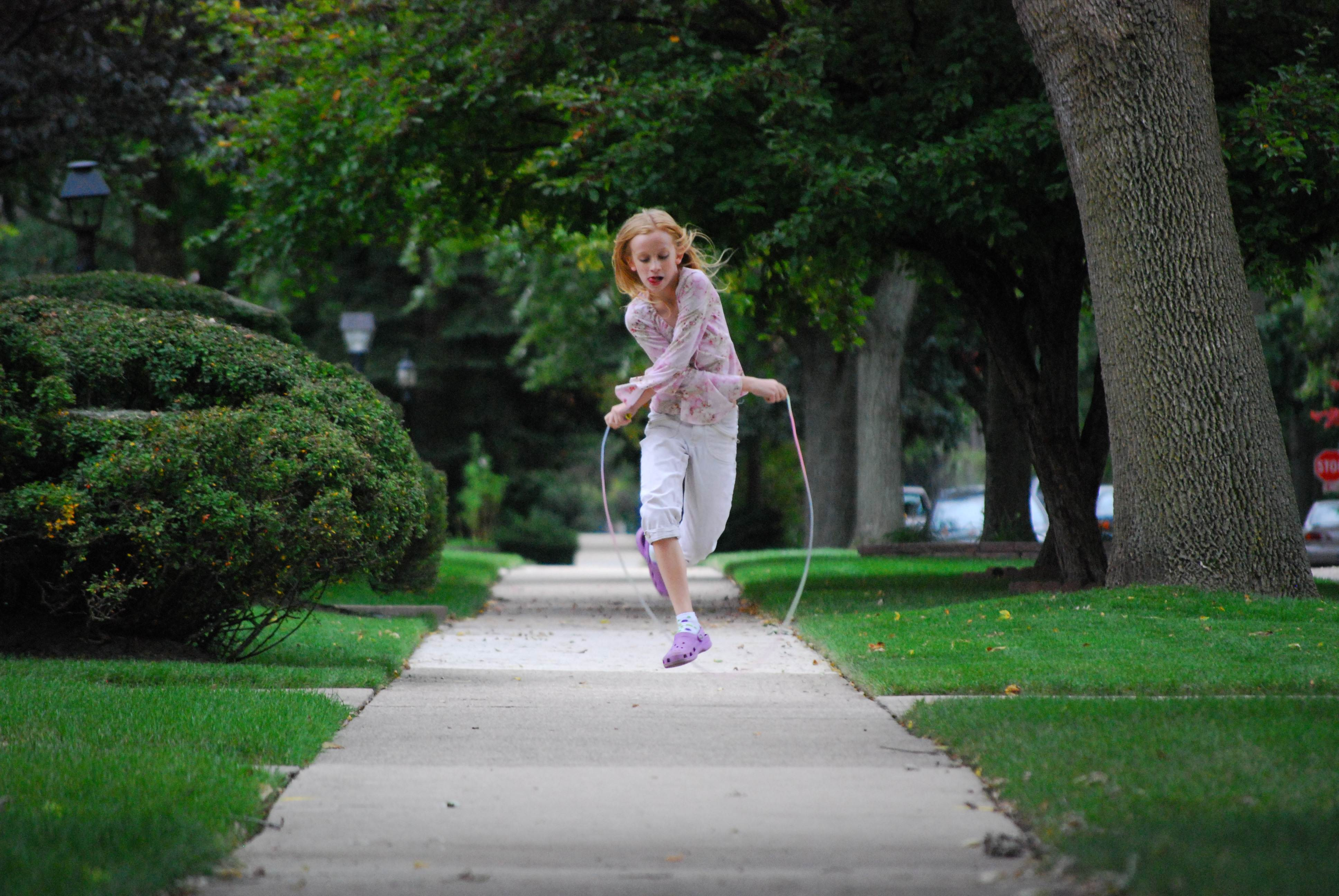
Criss-cross technique

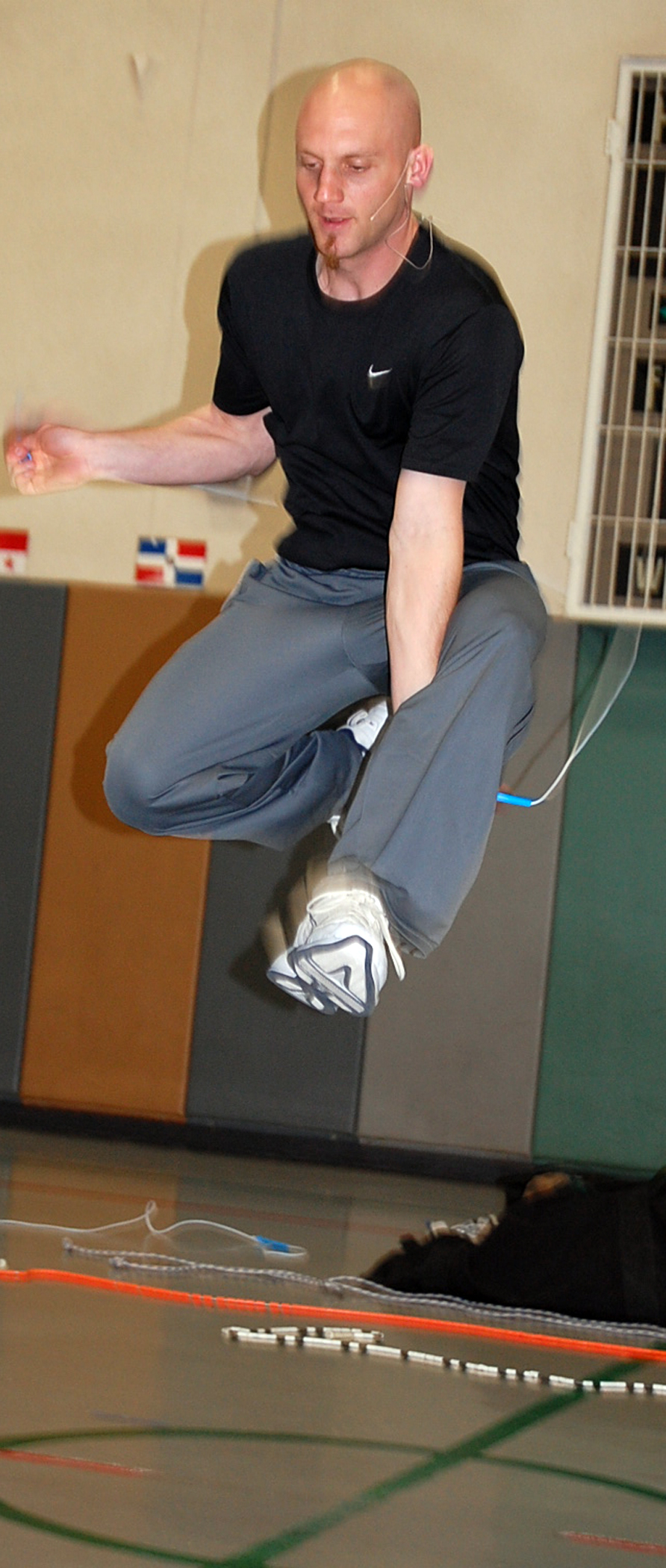
Leg over technique

There are a wide range of skipping techniques which can be performed. They may also be combined together and sequenced into a routine.

For solo jumping, the participant jumps and swings the rope under their feet. The timing of the swing is matched to their jump. This allows them to jump the rope and establish a rhythm more successfully. This can be contrasted with swinging the rope at the feet and jumping, which means that they are matching the jump to the swing. This makes it harder to jump the rope and establish a rhythm.

Examples of skipping techniques include:

=== Basic jump (easy jump) ===
Jump with both feet slightly apart as the rope passes underfoot. Often the first technique learned before moving onto more advanced techniques.

=== Slow (double bounce) ===
Turn the rope slowly and add a light bounce between jumps.

=== Alternate foot jump (speed step) ===
Alternate feet while jumping. Frequently used in speed events and can increase jumps per minute relative to a basic jump.

=== Criss-cross ===
Also known as crossover, cross arms, or a cross. Cross the forearms in front of the body while performing a basic jump.

=== Side swing ===
Swing the rope beside the body without jumping it, often as a transition.

=== EB (front-back cross or sailor) ===
A criss-cross with one arm behind the back.

=== Double under (DU) ===
Complete two rope revolutions per jump with a higher, faster turn. Turning the rope three times is called a triple under. In competitions, participants may attempt quadruple (quads) and quintuple unders (quins) using the same method. The Guinness World Record currently belongs to Kirato Hitaka, who has managed to do 8 revolutions in one jump.

=== Boxer jump rope ===
One foot is positioned slightly forward with one foot slightly back. The person positions their bodyweight primarily over their front foot, with the back foot acting as a stabilizer. From this stance, the person jumps up several times (often 2-3 times) before switching their stance, so the front foot becomes the back foot, and the back foot becomes the front foot. And so forth. An advantage of this technique is that it allows the back leg a brief rest. So while both feet are still used in the jump, a person may find they can skip for longer than if they were using the basic two-footed technique.

=== Toad / inverse toad / elephant ===
Variations of the criss-cross performed while threading an arm under or around a leg; combinations create more complex crosses.

=== Leg over ===
Also known as a Crougar. Hook one arm under the adjacent leg while performing a basic jump. Some find the non-dominant-leg version easier.

=== Awesome Annie (swish) ===
Alternates a leg over and a toad without an intervening open jump.

=== Frog (donkey kick) ===
From a handstand, return to the feet, and clear the rope. A more advanced version turns the rope during the descent.

=== TJ ===
A triple-under combination where the first 'jump' is a side swing, the middle jump is a toad, and the final jump in the open.

=== Mic release / mamba release ===
One hand the handle for side swings and recatches. Continuous side-to-side releases form the mamba patterns. First demonstrated by Mike Fry in 2004.

=== Mamba release ===
One hand lets go of the rope, which is swung on one side, then pulled over to the other side, and back and forth. After a number of swings, the rope is recaught. Jumping can continue throughout.

=== Flick ===
Involves momentarily releasing one handle of the rope and throwing it between the jumper's legs. The rope is then pulled back to the front, caught by the released hand, and the jumper resumes skipping.

=== Chinese Wheel ===
Two jumpers each hold one handle of two ropes. The ropes are turned so that the jumpers alternate their jumps, with the right hands moving together followed by the left hands. Each jumper must coordinate their timing to jump their rope without tripping while the other is in midair.

=== Competition techniques ===
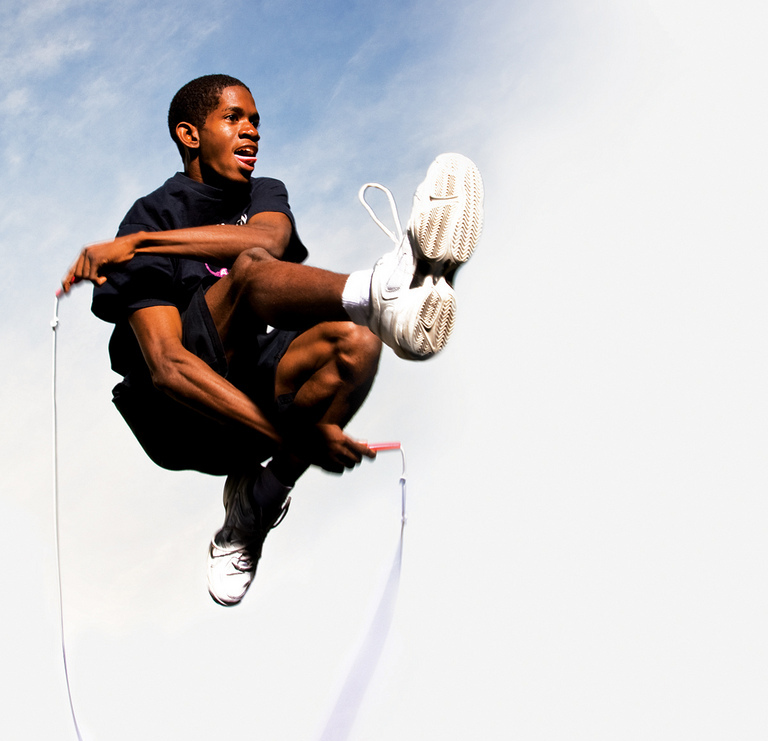
Advanced competition technique

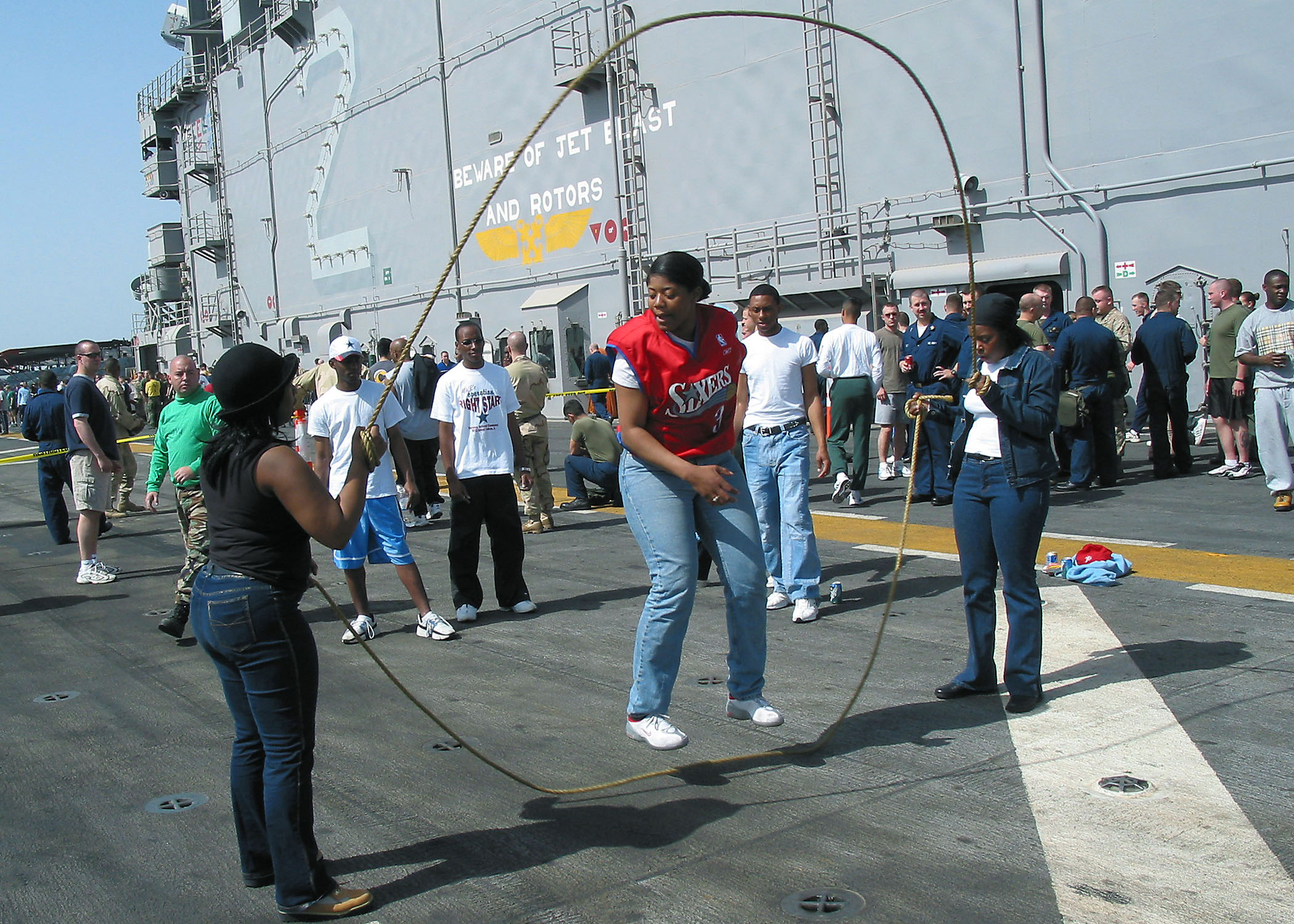
Double Dutch competition during a steel beach picnic on the ship USS Saipan (LHA-2)

In competition, participants are required to demonstrate competence using specific techniques. Required elements and scoring vary by judging system and country, but typically assess difficulty, execution, synchronization (for teams), and speed.

== Fitness and training ==
Skipping is an aerobic exercise comparable to running or cycling at moderate to vigorous intensities. Weighted skipping ropes can increase resistance, and in turn difficulty and effectiveness, of training. The activity is accessible to a wide range of ages and fitness levels and can be performed indoors or outdoors.

It is also widely incorporated in training programs for boxing and other combat sports to improve cardiovascular fitness and coordination, requiring hands and feet to move in sync. It helps boxers develop efficient footwork by training timing, rhythm, balance, and endurance, allowing fighters to move quickly and smoothly even when fatigued.

A 2019 study published in peer-reviewed Gait & Posture journal, found that when compared to running, skipping reduces ground reaction force (GRF) on the knees, producing far less tibiofemoral and patellofemoral contact forces, making it relatively easier on the knees. Despite lower knee impact, skipping has approximately 30% higher metabolic cost than running, making it a more efficient cardiovascular workout and allowing for shorter training sessions.

Because it requires fast, coordinated movements of both the feet and arms, skipping is considered a form of plyometric exercise and can be incorporated into high-intensity interval training (HIIT) routines.

== Competition ==
=== International ===
The world governing body for the sport of jump rope is the International Jump Rope Union (IJRU), formed by the merger of the International Rope Skipping Federation (FISAC-IRSF) and the World Jump Rope Federation (WJRF). FISAC-IRSF previously held biennial world championships, whereas WJRF held annual world championships. IJRU held its first world tournament in Colorado City, Colorado, in 2023 and a second took place in Kawasaki, Japan in 2025. In 2018, IJRU received GAISF Observer status, a step toward recognition within international sport governance.

The International Rope Skipping Organization (IRSO) re-emerged in 2019, and coordinates with national and regional groups outside of IJRU's structure. The organization is headed by Richard Cendali, who is referred to as the grandfather of the sport of jump rope.

=== World Inter School ===
The first World Inter-School Rope Skipping Championship was held in Dubai in November 2015. Subsequent editions took place in Eger, Hungary (2017), Hong Kong (2018), and Belgium (2019), organized by the World Inter School Rope Skipping Organization (WIRSO).

== Locations ==
=== United States ===
Historically, two organizations—the more stunt-oriented International Rope Skipping Organization (IRSO) and the aesthetics-oriented World Rope Skipping Federation (WRSF)—merged in 1995 to form the United States Amateur Jump Rope Federation, later renamed USA Jump Rope (USAJR). USAJR has hosted national tournaments and educational programs since 1995 and participates in the AAU Junior Olympic Games. The "American Jump Rope Federation" (AMJRF), founded in 2016 by former WJRF members, is recognized by IJRU as the U.S. governing body. The National Collegiate Jump Rope Association formed in 2019 to support college-level clubs and events. Few U.S. schools field formal jump-rope teams, and state-sanctioned elementary programs are uncommon.

== Types of jump ropes ==
- Speed ropes are made from a thin vinyl cord or wire and are primarily used for speed jumping or double-unders. They are best for indoor use, because they will wear down fast on concrete or other harsh surfaces.
- Licorice ropes are also made from vinyl cord or PVC and are primarily used for freestyle jumping due to their flexibility and control.
- Beaded ropes provide audible feedback as the beads strike the ground, and are commonly used in rhythmic skipping and double dutch freestyle.
- Leather ropes are thicker and less prone to tangling; they wear down more slowly outdoors.

== See also ==
- Chinese jump rope
- Double Dutch (jump rope)
- Jump Rope Challenge
- Skipping-rope rhyme
