= Variations of golf =

Activities similar to the game of golf

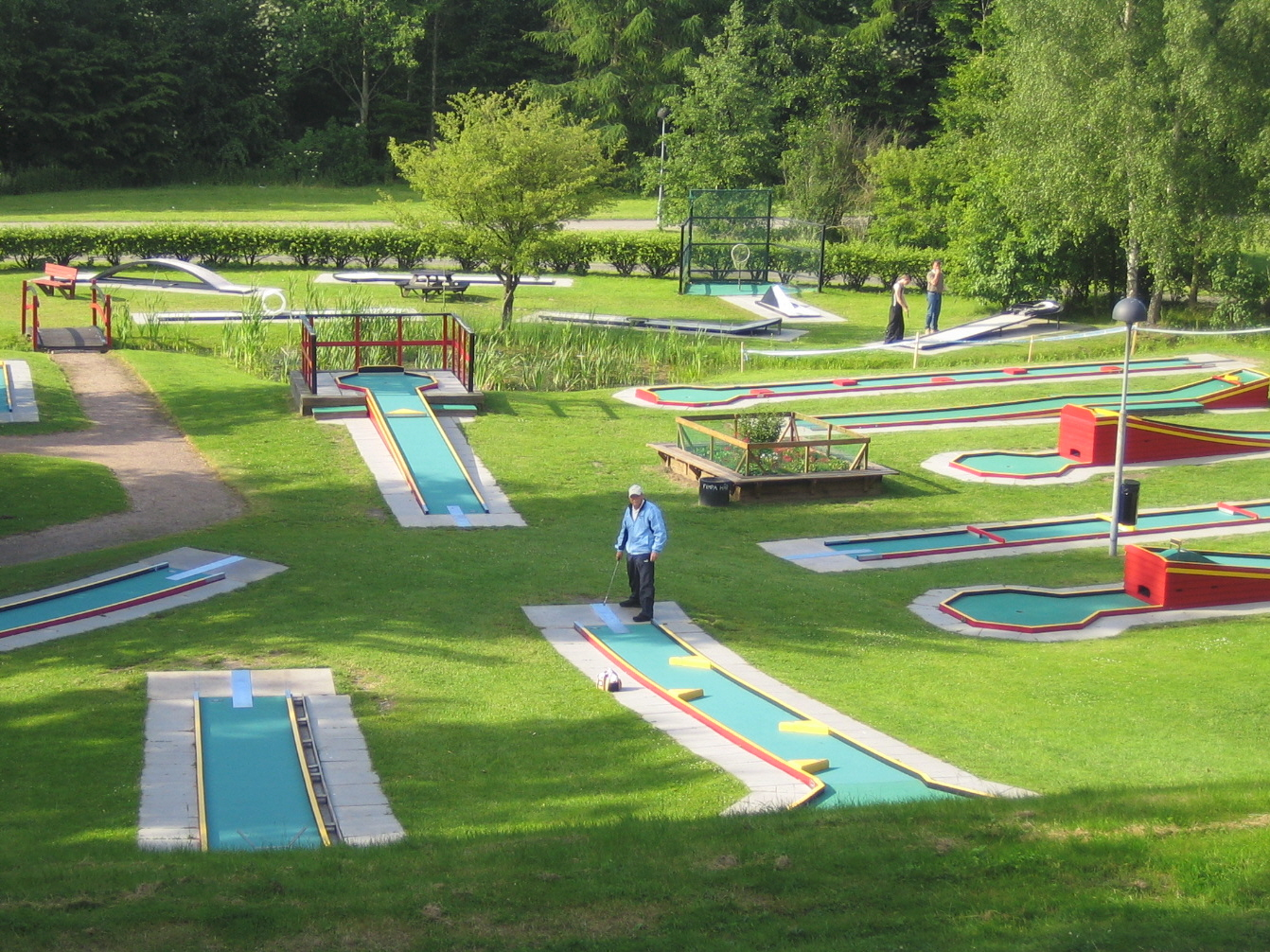
Minigolf course in Bulltoftaparken in Malmö, Sweden

Variations of golf include methods of scoring, starting procedures, playing formats, golf games, and activities based on or similar to the sport of golf which involve golf-like skills or goals.

Some variations are essentially identical to golf, but with only minor differences or focusing on a specific aspect of the game, while others are more distant and arguably not simple variations but distinct games. Many of these variations are played in non-professional settings, without the presence of officials and sometimes without strict adherence to any official rules. Sometimes the rules are in place to provide a structure for side-betting that is independent of the final "traditional" score.

== Scoring formats ==
=== Stroke play ===
In stroke play, the score is derived by counting the total number of strokes taken.

=== Match play ===
In match play, the score is derived by counting the total number of holes "won" and subtracting the number of holes "lost".

=== Stableford ===
Under the Stableford scoring system the player gains points according to the number of strokes taken on each hole in relation to par. Standard scoring is 1 point for a bogey, 2 points for a par, 3 points for a birdie, 4 points for an eagle. The points achieved for each hole of the round or tournament are added to produce the total points score, and the player with the highest score wins.

In Modified Stableford, the standard Stableford system is altered to use different point levels. For example, in professional golf at the Barracuda Championship on the PGA Tour, the points system is: plus 8 for an albatross, plus 5 for an eagle, plus 2 for a birdie, 0 points for par, minus 1 for a bogey, and minus 3 for a double bogey or worse.

=== Par and bogey ===
In par and bogey competitions each participant competes in match play against the course. On each hole, the player competes against par or bogey (in the traditional sense), and "wins" if they score a birdie or better, "lose" if they score a bogey or worse, and "halve" by scoring par. The player with the best win–loss differential is the winner.

== Playing formats ==
In addition to playing as an individual, golf affords the opportunity to play in many pairs and team formats.

=== Foursomes ===
Foursomes, or alternate shot, is a pairs format. Each pair has only one ball in play and players alternate playing strokes until the hole is completed. Foursomes can be played as match play or stroke play.

A variant of foursomes is greensomes, also called Scotch Foursomes or modified alternate shot. In greensomes, both players tee off and then select which ball with which to complete the hole. The player who did not hit the chosen first shot plays the second shot and play then alternates as in foursomes. A variant of greensomes, often referred to as gruesomes or bloodsomes, is sometimes played where the opposing team chooses which of their opponent's tee shots they should use, usually the worse one which may even be unplayable. Play then continues as in greensomes.

Another variation of foursomes is Chapman, also known as Pinehurst or American Foursomes. Under Chapman rules, both players tee off and then play their partner's ball for the second shot before alternately taking strokes having selected the ball with which to complete the hole; the next (third) stroke is played by the player who hit the chosen ball from the tee.

=== Four-ball ===
Four-ball (also known as better-ball, and sometimes best-ball) is a pairs format. Each player plays their own ball, with the better of the two scores on each hole counting as the pair's score. Four-ball can be played as match play or stroke play.

=== Best ball ===
In best ball, each member of the team plays their own ball as normal, but the lowest/best score of all the players on the team counts as the team's score on each hole.

Variations of best ball include Bowmaker, 1–2–3 Best Ball (or ChaChaCha), Fourball Alliance, Arizona Shuffle and Low Ball/High Ball; in each of these formats a set number of the players scores count for the team on each hole.

The term best ball is also sometimes used when referring to four-ball.

=== Scramble ===
In a scramble each player in a team tees off on each hole, and the players decide which shot was best. Every player then plays their second shot from within a clublength of where the best ball has come to rest, and the procedure is repeated until the hole is finished. The format is used in the PGA Tour's QBE Shootout and Father/Son Challenge, titled since 2020 as the PNC Championship.

There are many variations on the scramble format. Commonly played ones include Ambrose, which uses net scoring with a team handicap; Florida scramble, where after each stroke the player whose ball is selected does not play the next one; and Texas scramble, in which a set number of each team member's tee shots must be used. In a champagne scramble or shamble each player tees off on each hole before selecting the best drive and completing the hole in using a variation of best-ball format.

=== Patsome ===
Patsome is played in pairs with holes being played in a rotation of four-ball, greensomes and foursomes formats. Typically, the first six holes will be four-ball, the next six greensomes, and the final six foursomes.

== Golf games and betting ==
=== Nassau ===
The Nassau is three bets in one: best score on the front nine, best score on the back nine and best score over the full 18. The Nassau is perhaps the most common bet among golfers and can be applied to all standard scoring formats.

=== Skins ===
In a skins game, golfers compete on each hole as a separate contest. The player with the best outright score on each hole wins the "skin", which is prize money in the professional game or a wager for amateurs. If the hole is tied by any number of the competitors, the skin rolls over to the next hole so that it is then worth two skins. It is common for the value of the skins to increase as the round progresses.

=== Nines ===
Nines, or 9-points, is a variant of match play typically played among threesomes, where each hole is worth a total of nine points. The player with the lowest score on a hole receives five points, the next-lowest score 3 and the next-lowest score 1. Ties are generally resolved by summing the points contested and dividing them among the tying players; a two-way tie for first is worth four points to both players, a two-way tie for second is worth two points to both players, and a three-way tie is worth three points to each player. The player with the highest score after 18 holes (in which there are 162 points to be awarded) wins the game. This format can be used to wager on the game systematically; players each contribute the same amount of money to the pot, and a value is assigned to each point scored (or each point after 18) based on the amount of money in the pot, with any overage going to the overall winner.

A variation on nines is sixes, or split sixes, in which six points are available on each hole, awarded 4-2-0 with ties resolved as in nines.

=== Bingo Bango Bongo ===
Bingo Bango Bongo is a points-based game that can be played by two or more players or teams. In Bingo Bango Bongo, three types of achievements are rewarded with a point: first player to get their ball on the green (bingo), closest to the hole once all balls are on the green (bango), first to hole out (bongo). The player with the lowest outright score on hole wins 2 points, i.e. if 2 or more players tie no points are given out. At the end of the game the player with the most points wins. Bingo Bango Bongo is considered a game for skilled players, and its point-based scoring makes it a popular side-game for wagering.

=== Wolf ===
Wolf is a golf game for groups of four. It is scored individually but played as 2-on-2 better-ball or 3-on-1 best-ball in teams that are determined at the start of each hole. The order of play from the tee is decided prior to the start and is kept throughout the round, except the starting player (the "Wolf") rotates each hole, i.e. if the order for hole 1 is ABCD, the order for hole 2 would then be BCDA, etc. Everyone plays individually, with each of the players on the team with the lowest individual score on each hole earning a point. After hole 16 the rotation has completed four times, and it is usual for the player in last place to be designated as the Wolf for the final two holes. The player with the most points at the end of the round wins.

At the start of each hole, the Wolf decides whether or not they want each of the other players as their team-mate for the hole immediately after each of them tee off. The Wolf may choose to reject all the other players, in which case the hole is played as 3 against 1 and the points are doubled. The wolf can also elect to be a "Lone Wolf" before their own tee shot, in which case the points are multiplied by 4, or after they have played but before the others, in which case the points are multiplied by 3.

=== Dingo ===
Dingo is a close variation of Wolf suitable for groups of four. Aptly named after the opportunistic dingo's hunting style, as holes are played both in paired teams, and individually.

The first 16 holes are played similarly to Wolf, whereby team selection occurs at the start of each hole. The rotating dingo (last to tee off) selects a partner immediately after seeing any drive, or opts to go it alone. The last 2 holes are played on an individual basis. This variation gives each player equal opportunity to act as dingo, and allows a trailing player more of a chance to come back for the win.

With dingo, the scoring format is not imposed, although Stableford is recommended. Players agree on a scoring format (Matchplay, Strokeplay or Stableford) at the start of the round. Scoring for Matchplay is identical to Wolf for the first 16 holes. The last 2 holes are worth 2 points/skins each (or 4 if agreed in advance).

Scoring for Strokeplay/Stableford is as follows: When paired, teams record the best score (lowest for Strokeplay, highest for Stableford). Dingos opting to go alone on the first 16 holes play against a team of 3, and both groups record the best score accordingly. If a dingo going alone wins the hole outright, a bonus point is awarded. On the last 2 holes, regular Strokeplay/Stableford scoring applies.

As a 3 player variant, the first 15 holes are played as the dingo opting to go alone. The last 3 holes are played individually.

=== Acey deucey ===
Aces and deuces, or acey deucey, is a bet in which there is a winner, two modest losers, and one big loser on each hole. A game for groups of four, the low scorer ("ace") on each hole wins a certain amount from each of the other three players; while the high scorer ("deuce") on each hole owes each of the other three. The ace is usually worth twice the deuce, and there is nothing for ties.

=== Round robin ===
Round robin, also known as Hollywood or sixes, is a game for groups of four. Players compete against each other in pairs, rotating partners every six holes.

=== Criers and whiners ===
Criers and whiners is known by many different names including No Alibis, Replay, Play it Again, and Mulligans. As the latter would suggest, it's a game of mulligans with handicaps being translated into the number of do-overs golfers are allowed during the round.

=== Devil-Ball ===
Devil Ball is a betting game played by a golf foursome. Golf holes are ranked 1 through 18 based on the difficulty of the hole. In Devil Ball, each hole is worth the handicap value of the hole. For example, the number 1 handicap hole is worth 1 point and the 18th handicap hole is worth 18 points. There are 171 points available. Games can be played individually or as a 2-man best ball. The game is usually played in the 2 man best ball format. The low score wins the hole and captures the points. If the scores for the hole result in a tie, the value of the tied hole is carried over to the next hole and continues to carry over until a hole is won. Each point is worth one dollar.

=== Side bets ===
==== Sandies ====
A betting game whereby any player making par after having been in a bunker on the hole wins points or money. The bunker can be at any spot on the hole, yet particulars are dependent on local rules.

==== Barkies ====
Barkies, sometimes called Woodies or Seves (as in Seve Ballesteros), are paid automatically to any player who makes par on a hole on which they hit a tree. The value of a Barkie is determined before the round.

==== Arnies ====
Arnies are side bets whose value should be determined prior to the round. They are won automatically by any golfer who makes a par without having managed to get their ball into the fairway. Named in honor of Arnold Palmer, who made quite a few "Arnies" in his time.

== Starting procedures ==
Competition format and organization sometimes necessitate variations on the usual starting procedure, where everyone begins from the first tee and plays all holes in order through to the eighteenth, in order for the course to accommodate all competitors effectively.

=== Two-tee start ===
Some 18-hole courses are configured in loops, usually of 9 holes, that start and end close to the clubhouse which facilitate two or more starting points. In large field tournaments, especially on professional tours before the field is reduced by a cut, a two tee start is commonplace with the field being split between starting on the first tee and the tenth tee (sometimes the ninth or eleventh depending on proximity to the clubhouse).

=== Shotgun start ===
Shotgun starts are mainly used for amateur tournament or society play, and allows all players to start and finish their round at roughly the same time. In this variant, each of the playing groups starts their game simultaneously on a different hole, for example a group starting on hole 5 will play through to the 18th hole and continue with hole 1, ending their round on hole 4.

== Golf based games ==
Golf based games may be minor adaptations of the sport, games focused on a specific skill, or hybrid games that integrate skill-sets and equipment from other sports or games. The term indoor golf encompasses a wide array of different golf related activities, including simulators and various practice facilities.

Some games that retain most characteristics of golf but with some specific adaptations. For example, pitch and putt is played on courses made up of very short holes; hickory golf eschews much modern technology; beach golf and snow golf are played on very different surfaces to a normal golf course; park golf uses a special club, plastic resin ball and course; urban golf does not use a traditional golf course; and speed golf is simply golf against the clock, but played with a limited number of clubs.

Activities that focus on a single aspect of golf include miniature golf which is a putting-based game, long drive where players compete to hit the ball the farthest, target golf where points are awarded corresponding to proximity to a target, and clock golf in which players putt to a single hole from each of 12 points arranged in a circle.

Games based on golf but using items other than clubs and a golf ball, often incorporating skills from other activities, include disc golf, footgolf, fungo golf, codeball, dart golf, GolfCross, Sholf, Swingolf and Target Bird Golf.

== See also ==
- Golf (billiards)
- Clock golf
