= Robert H. Storey =

Canadian bobsledder

Bob Storey
Personal information
- Born: December 3, 1942 (age 83) Collingwood, Ontario, Canada

Sport
- Sport: Bobsleigh

Robert Hargan Storey (born December 3, 1942) is a Canadian bobsledder who competed from the mid-1960s to the early 1970s who later became a businessman and chairman of two communication companies in Canada. Storey served as fourth president of the Fédération Internationale de Bobsleigh et de Tobogganing (FIBT – International Bobsleigh and Tobogganing Federation) from 1994 to 2010, and was instrumental in Vancouver being awarded the 2010 Winter Olympics. He went on to marry Catherine Storey and they had three children. As a competitor, he competed in two Winter Olympics, earning his best finish of 14th in the two-man event at Sapporo in 1972.

== Bobsleigh career ==
A native of Collingwood, Ontario, Storey got into bobsleigh in the mid-1960s. He first became known when was part of the Canadian four-man team who crashed on the bobsleigh track at Lake Placid, New York, in the United States in February 1966 that took the life of Italian-born, Canadian-emigrated Sergio Zardini and severely injured fellow bobsledder Michael Young. Competing in two Winter Olympic games, Storey earned his best finish of 14th in the two-man event at Sapporo in 1972. He became a coach for the Canadian bobsleigh team for the 1976 Winter Olympics in Innsbruck, earning their best finish of 17th in the four-man event. From 1976 to 1994, he served as president of Bobsleigh Canada Skeleton twice. In 1984, Storey was elected to serve as Vice President of FIBT and became FIBT President in 1994, a position served until 2010 when he was defeated 22–20 for a fifth term by former Italian bobsledder Ivo Ferriani. Besides being FIBT President, Storey served on the Association of International Olympic Winter Sports Federations, the General Association of International Sports Federations, the Canadian Olympic Committee, and served on the International Olympic Committee (IOC) Sport and the Environment Committee. In bidding for the 2010 Winter Games in Vancouver, he served as Chief International Strategist for which Vancouver was awarded in July 2003. Storey served on the Coordination Commission for the 2012 Winter Youth Olympics in Innsbruck, a commission chaired by International Ski Federation (FIS) President Gian Franco Kasper and includes International Skating Union President Ottavio Cinquanta and fellow Canadian Beckie Scott, the first North American woman to medal in cross country skiing at the Winter Olympics.

== Business career ==
After retiring from competitive bobsleigh in the early 1970s, Storey became involved in the communication and broadcasting business in Canada. During his broadcasting career, he founded South Fraser Broadcasting Limited, and later served as president of Teraca Communications. Storey was later a consultant for Masabe and Company. In 2005, he joined the Board of Directors for the Canadian Satellite Radio Holdings Inc. which is headquartered in Toronto. Storey also serves on several boards of directors for broadcasting companies both in Canada and in the United States. He was able to parlay his broadcasting success into increased television and later internet coverage for the FIBT.
