= Matías Perrone =

Argentine FootGolf player

Personal information
- Born: c. 1982 San Isidro, Buenos Aires, Argentina

Sport
- Sport: Footgolf
- Turned pro: 2015

Achievements and titles
- Personal bests: FIFG FootGolf World Cup champion (2018); FIFG World Cup team champion (2018); 2× South American team champion (2022, 2024); Argentine FootGolf champion (2016)

Matías Perrone (born c. 1982) is an Argentine professional FootGolf player, best known for winning the individual titles at the 2018 Federation for International FootGolf (FIFG) FootGolf World Cup in Marrakech, Morocco. A one-time Argentine FootGolf champion (2016). His achievements include multiple national and international titles and podium finishes around the world.

== Early life ==
Matías Perrone was born around 1982 in San Isidro, Buenos Aires, Argentina. Growing up, he played association football as an amateur, developing a strong kicking technique that later translated to FootGolf. Perrone discovered FootGolf in 2010 through friends, entering his first tournament shortly after and quickly becoming hooked on the sport's blend of football and golf. Before turning professional, he worked in real estate, balancing his job with early FootGolf competitions.

== FootGolf career ==
Perrone began competing in FootGolf in 2010, joining tournaments governed by the Federation for International FootGolf (FIFG), the sport's global authority. He won his first Argentine FootGolf championship in 2016, establishing himself as a national leader. His dominance in Argentina led to international opportunities, including selection for the national team at the 2016 FIFG FootGolf World Cup in Buenos Aires, where Argentina finished third.

=== 2018 FootGolf World Cup ===
Perrone's career highlight came at the 2018 FIFG FootGolf World Cup in Marrakech, Morocco, where he won the individual title, defeating a field of international competitors, including England's Ben Clarke, who finished second. Argentina, with Perrone as a key member, also won the team World Cup title, solidifying the country's dominance in the sport. Perrone described the victory as a dream, comparing his achievement to Argentine sports legends like Diego Maradona. The win earned him widespread recognition, with media outlets noting his role in elevating FootGolf's profile in Argentina.

=== Post-2018 career ===
In 2019, Perrone competed in the Argentinian Open, a major FIFG World Tour event, finishing second to Ben Clarke, who won by five shots with a score of 20 under par. He continued to compete on the FIFG World Tour, though specific results from 2020 to 2023 are less documented due to the COVID-19 pandemic's impact on tournaments. In 2023, Perrone secured sponsorship from Bitcoin Cash Argentina, reflecting his growing commercial appeal. He also participated in the 2023 FIFG FootGolf World Cup in Orlando, Florida, where Argentina finished second in the team competition.

Perrone has been active in promoting FootGolf in Argentina, hosting clinics and community events, including a solidarity activity in La Cava, San Isidro, to introduce the sport to underprivileged youth. His efforts to counter skepticism about FootGolf's legitimacy, as noted in interviews, have helped attract sponsors like Naranja and Bitcoin Cash. Perrone's versatility, including his ability to compete in both individual and team formats, has been praised by coaches and peers.

== Personal life ==
Perrone resides in San Isidro, Buenos Aires, where his family have been present at his tournaments and local events. He started playing FootGolf after he finished playing amateur football, finding a new purpose in his life. Perrone has worked to increase the number of people playing FootGolf, particularly young athletes in Argentina, and has used his platform to advocate for the sport's recognition.

== Achievements ==
Major FootGolf achievements
Year	Competition	Result	Notes
2013	(United States) US Open	Third place	
2014	(United States) US Open	Champion	
2014	Capital Cup	Third place	
2015	(France) French Open	Champion	
2015	(Turkey) Turkish Open	Runner-up	
2016	(Argentina) Argentine FootGolf Championship	Champion	
2017	(Australia) Australian Open	Champion	
2017	Japan Open	Runner-up	
2017	Brazil Open	Champion	
2017	(Slovenia) Slovenian FootGolf Open	Runner-up	
2018	(Spain) Master de Madrid	Champion	
2018	(Morocco) FIFG FootGolf World Cup (Individual)	Champion	Marrakech
2018	(Morocco) FIFG FootGolf World Cup (Team)	Champion	Marrakech, with Argentina
2019	(Australia) Australian Open	Champion	
2019	(England) English Open	Champion	
2019	(Germany) KaiserKap Open	Champion	
2019	Bolivia Open	Champion	
2019	Ecuador Open	Champion	
2019	Capital Cup	Runner-up	
2019	Argentina Open	Third place	Major
2021	(Spain) Calatayud Open	Champion	
2021	(Mexico) Acapulco Open	Champion	
2022	South American FootGolf Championship (Team)	Champion	Captain of Argentina
2022	(United Kingdom) UK Open	Champion	
2022	Brazil Open	Champion	
2022	Mexico Open	Runner-up	
2023	Argentina Open	Third place	Major
2023	Mexico Open	Third place	Major
2023	(United States) FIFG FootGolf World Cup (Team)	Runner-up	Orlando, captain of Argentina
2024	South American FootGolf Championship (Team)	Champion	Captain of Argentina
2024	Mexico Open	Third place	Major
2024	(Italy) Italian Open	Champion	
2024	(Switzerland) Swiss Open	Champion	
2024	(Norway) Norwegian Open	Third place	
2024	(Italy) North Italian Open	Runner-up	
2026	(Dominican Republic) Dominican Open	Champion	
