= Global Association of International Sports Federations =

Nonprofit sports organisation

GAISF
- Global Association of International Sports Federations
- Abbreviation: GAISF
- Successor: SportAccord
- Formation: 1967; 59 years ago
- Dissolved: 14 September 2023; 3 years ago
- Type: Nonprofit organisation
- Purpose: Inter-sport federation organisation
- Headquarters: Lausanne, Switzerland
- Members: 97 full members 20 associate members
- President: Ivo Ferriani
- Parent organisation: International Olympic Committee

The Global Association of International Sports Federations (GAISF) was a nonprofit organisation of international sports federations. It changed its name to SportAccord from March 2009 to April 2017, when it reverted to its GAISF. It was an international sport organisation with 97 full members (international sports federations governing specific sports worldwide) and 20 associate members (organisations which conduct activities closely related to the international sports federations).

In November 2022, the members of the Global Association of International Sports Federations (GAISF) voted to dissolve the organisation.

The revised governance structure will see the Association of IOC Recognised International Sports Federations (ARISF) and the Alliance of Independent Recognised Members of Sport (AIMS) join the Association of Summer Olympic International Federations (ASOIF) and the Winter Olympic Federations (WOF) as the four main stakeholders of SportAccord.

Members of the GAISF approved the final steps in the liquidation of the organisation at an extraordinary general assembly held on 14 September 2023.

== GAISF Council ==
The council was composed of a president, two vice presidents, a treasurer, and five members.

The council's final composition was:

Designation	Name	Country	Sport Federation
President	Ivo Ferriani	Italy	International Bobsleigh and Skeleton Federation
Vice-President	Stephan Fox	Germany/Australia	International Federation of Muaythai Amateur
Treasurer	Riccardo Fraccari	Italy	World Baseball Softball Confederation
Council Members	Marisol Casado	Spain	International Triathlon Union
Council Members	Kate Caithness	Scotland/United Kingdom	World Curling Federation
Council Members	Raffaele Chiulli	Italy	International Powerboating Federation
Council Members	Nenad Lalović	Serbia	United World Wrestling
Council Members	Ingmar De Vos	Belgium	International Equestrian Federation

== Function ==
GAISF was the umbrella organisation for both Olympic and non-Olympic international sports federations, as well as organisers of international sporting events. In this role it provided expertise in, for example, anti-doping, integrity, and social responsibility. By establishing multi-sports games that group together similar sports, GAISF aimed to promote the members and the members' visibility.

== Membership ==
Member international federations could be either full or associate members of GAISF.

== History ==
GAISF is deeply rooted in the sports movement. As early as 1921, international sports federations (IFs) expressed the need for a representative of their common objectives and interests. Under the direction of Paul Rousseau, Secretary General of the Union Cycliste International (UCI), a permanent bureau of the IFs was established to facilitate dialogue with the Olympic authorities.

In 1967, 26 international sports federations met in Lausanne, agreed on the need to increase permanent liaisons, and adopted the name "General Assembly of International Sports Federations". In order to establish a more formalised organisation, the "General Association of International Sports Federations" (GAISF) was formed in 1976, and the headquarters were moved to Monaco two years later.

The new millennium brought important changes to the organisation. Reacting to the increasing pressure on IFs to professionalise and develop, GAISF, in collaboration with the Associations of Summer and Winter Olympic International Federations (ASOIF and AIOWF), launched the first SportAccord International Convention in 2003. This new format, “by sport for sport,” allowed IFs and sports business to get together, share knowledge, and network.

In March 2009, GAISF was rebranded SportAccord, and, in the same year, its offices moved from Monaco to Lausanne, the Olympic capital.

In April 2017, following the former president Marius Vizer's controversial attack against IOC president Thomas Bach during the opening SportAccord's 2015 convention in Sochi and his subsequent resignation, the organisation rebranded back to GAISF under its new president Patrick Baumann.

1920s

As early as 1921, under the direction of Paul Rousseau, Secretary General of the “Union Cycliste International”, a permanent bureau of the international sports federations (IFs) was created. With regular IFs/IOC meetings taking place, dialogue with the Olympic authorities became easier. However, organisations that were not part of the Olympic movement were excluded.

1960s

In the 1960s, the sports movement evolved rapidly. Roger Coulon, President of the “Fédération Internationale de Lutte Amateur,” was the first to express the need for a wider recognition of the role of IFs. For non-Olympic federations, a forum that would enable them to better express their points of view was necessary. The creation of a stable organisation ensuring permanent relations between IFs appeared to be the logical continuation of their meetings, which had taken place frequently but without rules or a fixed organisation. The common preparation of these meetings with the IOC could thus be better supported. It also permitted a constant liaison between the IFs and the general population. In 1966, the time seemed appropriate, and the conversion to the newly constituted Assembly was launched.

1967

On 21–23 April 1967, delegates from the following 26 international sports federations met in Lausanne in the Hotel Continental: Aeronautics, Rowing, Basketball, Bobsleigh, Boules, Canoeing, Cycling, Equestrian, Fencing, Gymnastics, Handball, Hockey, Ice Hockey, Judo, Luge, Wrestling, Motorcycling, Swimming, Modern Pentathlon, Roller Skating, Skiing, Shooting, Volleyball, Weightlifting, University Sport, and Maccabi.

The delegates agreed on the necessity to establish permanent liaisons between the IFs for the defence of their objectives and common goals, the preservation of their autonomy, and the constant exchange of information. The name “General Assembly of International Sports Federations” was adopted.

In 1976, this name was replaced by “General Association of International Sports Federations” (GAISF). In 1978, the office moved from Lausanne to Monaco. GAISF represented the extension of the past meetings of the IFs, dealing not only with Olympic matters, but also with all questions of common interest for the IFs.

2000s

In 2003, in collaboration with ASOIF and AIOWF, GAISF launched the first SportAccord Convention to answer a need of the IFs, which were looking for a “one-stop shop” where they could hold their annual meetings, be encouraged to network and share their knowledge.

In March 2009, GAISF was rebranded SportAccord at the meeting of the 7th SportAccord International Convention in Denver. In April 2009, it moved its main office from Monaco to Maison du Sport International in Lausanne, Switzerland.

On 25 May 2012, the last of eight days of the annual General Assembly of SportAccord in Quebec City, the Federation of International Lacrosse and the International Mind Sports Association were accepted, bringing the number of SportAccord members to 107.

On 31 May 2013, the last of eight days of the annual General Assembly of SportAccord in Saint Petersburg, the International Cheer Union and the Federation Internationale de l'Automobile were voted into SportAccord.

On 20 April 2015, at SportAccord's 2015 convention in Sochi, SportAccord president Marius Vizer made a speech that was sharply critical of the IOC and its president, Thomas Bach. Following the speech, the IAAF (now known as World Athletics), the ISSF, and World Archery withdrew from SportAccord in protest, and there were a number of further withdrawals in May 2015, including the International Rowing Federation.

At the 2017 convention in Aarhus, Federation Internationale du Sport Universitaire (FISU) and Federation of International Bandy (FIB) became full members and SportAccord was renamed GAISF.

By the end of 2018, the World ArmWrestling Federation (WAF) was the new addition to the GAISF Full Member List along with 4 Associate Members—the World Olympics Association, the International Sports Press Association, the World Union of Olympic Cities, and the World Federation of the Sporting Goods Industry.

In May 2019, Raffaele Chiulli was unanimously elected as GAISF President in Gold Coast, Australia.

== Member federations at time of dissolution ==
#	Sport	Organisation	Acronym	Founded	Membership			
#	Sport	Organisation	Acronym	Founded	ASOIF	AIOWF	ARISF	AIMS
1	Aikido	International Aikido Federation	IAF	1976				•
2	Air sports	World Air Sports Federation	FAI	1905			•	
3	American football	International Federation of American Football	IFAF	1998			•	
4	Aquatics	World Aquatics	AQUA	1908	•			
5	Archery	World Archery Federation	WA	1931	•			
6	Armwrestling	World Armwrestling Federation	WAF	1977				•
7	Athletics	World Athletics	IAAF	1912	•			
8	Automobile racing	Fédération Internationale de l'Automobile	FIA	1904			•	
9	Badminton	Badminton World Federation	BWF	1934	•			
10	Bandy	Federation of International Bandy	FIB	1955			•	
11	Baseball and softball	World Baseball Softball Confederation	WBSC	2013	Associate member		•	
12	Basketball	International Basketball Federation	FIBA	1932	•			
13	Basque pelota	Federación Internacional de Pelota Vasca	FIPV	1929			•	
14	Biathlon	International Biathlon Union	IBU	1993		•		
15	Billiard sports	World Confederation of Billiards Sports	WCBS	1992			•	
16	Bobsleigh	International Bobsleigh and Skeleton Federation	IBSF	1923		•		
17	Bodybuilding	International Federation of Bodybuilding & Fitness	IFBB	1946				•
18	Boules	Confédération Mondiale des Sports de Boules	CMSB	1985			•	
19	Bowling	International Bowling Federation	IBF	1952			•	
20	Boxing	International Boxing Association	IBA	1946	•			
21	Bridge	World Bridge Federation	WBF	1958			•	
22	Canoeing	International Canoe Federation	ICF	1946	•			
23	Casting	International Casting Sport Federation	ICSF	1955				•
24	Cheer	International Cheer Union	ICU	2004			•	
25	Chess	International Chess Federation	FIDE	1924			•	
26	Climbing & Mountaineering	International Climbing and Mountaineering Federation	UIAA	1932			•	
27	Cricket	International Cricket Council	ICC	1909			•	
28	Curling	World Curling Federation	WCF	1966		•		
29	Cycle Sport	International Cycling Union	UCI	1900	•			
30	DanceSport	World DanceSport Federation	WDSF	1957	Associate Member		•	
31	Darts	World Darts Federation	WDF	1974				•
32	Dragon Boat	International Dragon Boat Federation	IDBF	1991				•
33	Draughts	World Draughts Federation	FMJD	1947				•
34	Equestrian sports	International Federation for Equestrian Sports	FEI	1921	•			
35	Fencing	International Fencing Federation	FIE	1913	•			
36	Fistball	International Fistball Association	IFA	1960				•
37	Floorball	International Floorball Federation	IFF	1986			•	
38	Flying disc	World Flying Disc Federation	WFDF	1985			•	
39	Football	Fédération Internationale de Football Association	FIFA	1904	•			
40	Go	International Go Federation	IGF	1982				•
41	Golf	International Golf Federation	IGF	1958	•			
42	Gymnastics	International Gymnastics Federation	FIG	1881	•			
43	Handball	International Handball Federation	IHF	1946	•			
44	Field hockey	International Hockey Federation	FIH	1924	•			
45	Ice hockey	International Ice Hockey Federation	IIHF	1908		•		
46	Ice stock sport	International Federation Icestocksport	IFI	1975			•	
47	Judo	International Judo Federation	IJF	1951	•			
48	Ju-Jitsu	Ju-Jitsu International Federation	JJIF	1977				•
49	Karate	World Karate Federation	WKF	1970			•	
50	Kendo	International Kendo Federation	FIK	1970				•
51	Kickboxing	World Association of Kickboxing Organisations	WAKO	1976			•	
52	Korfball	International Korfball Federation	IKF	1963			•	
53	Lacrosse	World Lacrosse	WL	2008			•	
54	Lifesaving	International Life Saving Federation	ILS	1993			•	
55	Luge	Fédération Internationale de Luge de Course	FIL	1957		•		
56	Minigolf	World Minigolf Sport Federation	WMF	1963				•
57	Modern pentathlon	Union Internationale de Pentathlon Moderne	UIPM	1912	•			
58	Motorcycle racing	Fédération Internationale de Motocyclisme	FIM	1904			•	
59	Muaythai	International Federation of Muaythai Amateur	IFMA	1993			•	
60	Netball	International Federation of Netball Associations	IFNA	1960			•	
61	Orienteering	International Orienteering Federation	IOF	1961			•	
62	Polo	Federation of International Polo	FIP	1983			•	
63	Powerboating	Union Internationale Motonautique	UIM	1927			•	
64	Powerlifting	International Powerlifting Federation	IPF	1971				•
65	Practical shooting	International Practical Shooting Confederation	IPSC	1976				•
66	Racquetball	International Racquetball Federation	IRF	1950			•	
67	Roller sports	World Skate	FIRS	1924	•			
68	Rowing	World Rowing	FISA	1892	•			
69	Rugby union	World Rugby	WR	1886	•			
70	Sailing	World Sailing	WS	1907	•			
71	Sambo	Fédération Internationale de Sambo	FIAS	1992			•	
72	Savate	Federation Internationale de Savate	FISav	1992				•
73	Sepaktakraw	International Sepaktakraw Federation	ISTAF	1988				•
74	Shooting sport	International Shooting Sport Federation	ISSF	1907	•			
75	Skating	International Skating Union	ISU	1892		•		
76	Skiing	Fédération Internationale de Ski	FIS	1924		•		
77	Ski mountaineering	International Ski and Snowboard Federation	ISMF	2008			•	
78	Sleddog	International Federation of Sleddog Sports	IFSS	1992				•
79	Soft tennis	International Soft Tennis Federation	ISTF	1999				•
80	Sport climbing	International Federation of Sport Climbing	IFSC	2007	•			
81	Sports fishing	Confédération Internationale de la Pêche Sportive	CIPS	1952				•
82	Squash	World Squash Federation	WSF	1967			•	
83	Sumo	International Sumo Federation	IFS	1992			•	
84	Surfing	International Surfing Association	ISASurf	1964	•			
85	Table tennis	International Table Tennis Federation	ITTF	1926	•			
86	Taekwondo	World Taekwondo	WT	1973	•			
87	Tennis	International Tennis Federation	ITF	1913	•			
88	Teqball	International Federation of Teqball	FITEQ	2017				•
89	Triathlon	International Triathlon Union	ITU	1989	•			
90	Tug of war	Tug of War International Federation	TWIF	1960			•	
91	Underwater sports	Confédération Mondiale des Activités Subaquatiques	CMAS	1959			•	
92	University Sports	Fédération Internationale du Sport Universitaire	FISU	1949			•	
93	Volleyball	Fédération Internationale de Volleyball	FIVB	1947	•			
94	Waterskiing	International Waterski & Wakeboard Federation	IWWF	1955			•	
95	Weightlifting	International Weightlifting Federation	IWF	1905	•			
96	Wrestling	United World Wrestling	UWW	1912	•			
97	Wushu	International Wushu Federation	IWUF	1990			•	
					31+2	7	39	20

== Associate members at time of dissolution ==
- Association of Paralympic Sports Organisations (APSO)
- Commonwealth Games: Commonwealth Games Federation (CGF)
- Masters Games: International Masters Games Association (IMGA)
- Mediterranean Games: International Committee of Mediterranean Games (ICMG or CIJM)
- Military World Games: Conseil International du Sport Militaire (CISM)
- World Mind Sports Games: International Mind Sports Association (IMSA)
- World Transplant Games Federation (WTGF)
- Paralympic Games: International Paralympic Committee (IPC)
- School Sports: International School Sport Federation (ISF)
- Special Olympics: Special Olympics (SOI)
- Sports for the Deaf: International Committee of Sports for the Deaf (CISS)
- The World Games: International World Games Association (IWGA)
- CSIT World Sports Games: International Workers and Amateurs in Sports Confederation (CSIT)

Other members were:

- European broadcasting: European Broadcasting Union (EBU / UER)
- Panathlon: Panathlon International (PI)
- World Olympians Association (WOA)
- Sports chiropractic: Federation Internationale de Chiropratique du Sport (FICS)
- Sports facilities: International Association for Sports and Leisure Facilities (IAKS)
- Sports medicine: International Federation of Sports Medicine (FIMS)
- Sports journalism: International Sports Press Association (AIPS)
- Olympic cities: World Union of Olympic Cities
- Sporting Goods Industry: World Federation of the Sporting Goods Industry (WFSGI)

== Observers at time of dissolution ==
Before the dissolution of GAISF in 2023, the GAISF Observer Status could be requested by the applicants for GAISF membership interested to obtain support and guidance in their path to fulfil the GAISF membership criteria. At the time of dissolution, it had 11 observers:

Sport	Organisation	Acronym	Official website	Notes
Dodgeball	World Dodgeball Association	WDA	dodgeball.sport	(Note: Also a member of The Association for International Sport for All (TAFISA).)
Footgolf	Federation for International FootGolf	FIFG	fifg.org	
Jump rope	International Jump Rope Union	IJRU	ijru.sport	
Kettlebell lifting	International Union of Kettlebell Lifting	IUKL	giri-iukl.com/en	
Obstacle racing	World Obstacle	FISO	worldobstacle.org	
Padel	International Padel Federation	IPF	padelfip.com	
Poker	International Federation of Match Poker	IFMP	matchpoker.sport	
Pole sports	International Pole and Aerial Sports Federation	IPSF	ipsfsports.org	
Rafting	International Rafting Federation	IRF	internationalrafting.com	
Rugby league	Rugby League International Federation	IRL	intrl.sport	
Table football/soccer	International Table Soccer Federation	ITSF	tablesoccer.org	

== List of GAISF presidents ==
President	Member of	Duration
William Berge Phillips	FINA	1967–1969
Thomas Keller	FISA	1969–1986
Un Yong Kim	WTF	1986–2004
Hein Verbruggen	UCI	2004–2013
Marius Vizer	IJF	2013–2015
Gian-Franco Kasper	FIS	2015–2016
Patrick Baumann	FIBA	2016–2018
Raffaele Chiulli	UIM	2018–2021
Ivo Ferriani	IBSF	2021–2023

== Final organisational structure ==
President	Vice President	Interim Manager
Ivo Ferriani	Stephan Fox	Nis Hatt

== See also ==
- Association of Summer Olympic International Federations
- Winter Olympic Federations
- Association of IOC Recognised International Sports Federations
- SportAccord
- International World Games Association
- List of international sports federations
