= Target Bird Golf =

Japanese golf-like sport with shuttlecock

- Highest governing body: Japan Target Bird Golf Association
- Nicknames: TBG
- First played: 1969 (concept), 1985 (official)

Characteristics
- Contact: No
- Team members: Individual or teams
- Mixed-sex: Yes
- Type: Precision sport
- Equipment: Shuttle ball, wedge club, target hole
- Venue: Outdoor courses

Presence
- Olympic: No
- Paralympic: No

Target Bird Golf (Japanese: ターゲット・バードゴルフ, Tāgetto Bādo Gorufu), often abbreviated as TBG and sometimes described in English as badminton golf, is a precision sport that originated in Japan. It is essentially a miniaturized version of golf, using a specialized shuttlecock-style ball with synthetic feathers attached to a golf ball, which players strike with a standard golf wedge. The objective is to land the ball in an umbrella-shaped target hole, completing an 18-hole course in as few strokes as possible.

The sport was conceived in 1969 by Takashige Nojima (野嶋孝重, Nojima Takashige), a golf enthusiast from Kawaguchi City, Saitama Prefecture, and was officially introduced to the public in 1985. The feathered tail limits the ball's flight distance, allowing full golf swings to be taken safely in small spaces such as parks and open lots. Classified in Japan as a "new sport" (ニュースポーツ), it emphasizes control and accuracy over power and has become popular primarily among older adults as a lifelong sport (生涯スポーツ, shōgai supōtsu).

== History ==
=== Origins and inspiration ===
The concept of Target Bird Golf traces back to 1960, when Nojima Takashige, then employed at Sumitomo Bank, was first introduced to golf by a client. While captivated by the sport's excitement, he was struck by the prohibitively expensive playing fees. During this era, golf practice facilities were virtually nonexistent in Japan, and the sport remained accessible only to the wealthy elite.

Nojima spent years contemplating how to make golf more accessible. The breakthrough came in 1969, when he watched the historic Apollo 11 moon landing on television. Observing the lunar module descend gently onto the moon's surface inspired him to envision a ball that could similarly float and land softly. This led to the creation of the "controlled-wing golf ball" (制御翼付ゴルフボール) – a golf ball with badminton-style synthetic feathers attached, designed to limit flight distance and enable play in confined spaces.

=== Official launch and early development ===
On February 8, 1985, the sport was officially announced under the name "Target Bird Golf." Initially conceived as a nearest-to-the-pin (ニアピン) competition, the sport underwent significant refinement and development. The turning point came in August 1985, when the sport was showcased as an attraction at the 1st Itoen Ladies Golf Tournament in Shizuoka Prefecture. For this event, Nojima transformed the format into a course-based competition, using hula hoops placed on the ground with beach umbrellas as targets.

Following national television coverage on NHK's "Sunday Sports Special" in December 1985, the sport gained widespread attention. Over 160 media outlets, including television networks, magazines, and newspapers, covered Target Bird Golf in 1986, generating significant public interest.

=== National organization ===
In June 1988, the Japan Target Bird Golf Association (日本ターゲット・バードゴルフ協会) was established, with Professor Hasegawa Junzo of the University of Tsukuba serving as its first chairman. That same year, the sport was adopted as an official event at the 1st National Sports Recreation Festival (全国スポーツ・レクリエーション祭) held in Yamanashi Prefecture.

In October 1986, the Ministry of Education officially recognized Target Bird Golf as a lifelong sport. The 1st All-Japan Target Bird Golf Championship was held in Hiroshima Prefecture in October 2003. By 2008, regional associations had been established in 44 prefectures across Japan, with an estimated 100,000 enthusiasts nationwide.

=== National Athletic Meet participation ===
In 2005, Target Bird Golf made its debut at the National Athletic Meet (Kokutai) as a demonstration sport during the Okayama Games. The sport continues to be featured at the annual Nenrin Pick (ねんりんピック), Japan's national sports festival for senior citizens, and remains a regular event at the National Sports Recreation Festival.

== Rules and gameplay ==
=== Basic format ===
Target Bird Golf follows rules similar to traditional golf. A standard game consists of 18 holes with a par of 72 strokes. Players typically compete in groups of four, taking turns in order of their scores from the previous hole. The player with the fewest strokes at the end of the round wins.

The primary competition formats include stroke play (counting total strokes) and match play (competing hole by hole). The starting order on the first hole is determined by rock-paper-scissors (じゃんけん, janken), with subsequent holes following the standard honor system based on previous hole scores.

=== The target hole system ===
Unlike traditional golf, Target Bird Golf employs a unique dual-hole system:

- Advantage Hole (アドバンテージホール): An elevated, umbrella-shaped target with a diameter of 110 centimeters. Landing the ball in this hole counts the actual number of strokes taken.
- Second Hole (セカンドホール): A ring placed on the ground with a diameter of approximately 86 centimeters. If the ball lands in this hole instead of the elevated target, one penalty stroke is added to the player's score.

This system encourages players to aim for the elevated target while providing a fallback option, adding strategic depth to the game.

=== Penalties ===
When a ball goes out of bounds, players must return it to the fairway without bringing it closer to the hole, incurring a one-stroke penalty. Other rules regarding hazards, unplayable lies, and course conduct largely mirror those of traditional golf.

== Gameplay ==
Target Bird Golf follows the basic structure of golf. A round is normally played by groups of four over 18 holes with a par of 72, using stroke play or match play formats. Players use only one club—typically a standard golf pitching wedge or an association-approved club—for all shots.

Each shot is played from a small shot mat, which protects the ground and turf. The feathered ball typically flies 18 to 22 metres on a full swing, and long holes measure roughly 70 to 90 metres. Because the ball carries a feather tail, wind significantly affects its flight, adding a tactical element to play.

The target consists of two parts: an upper "advantage hole" about 110 cm in diameter, shaped like an upturned umbrella, and a ground-level "second hole" ring about 86 cm in diameter. Holing out in the second hole incurs one additional stroke compared with the advantage hole. Playing order after the first hole follows the lowest score on the previous hole; balls hit out of bounds are returned to the fairway without approaching the hole, with a one-stroke penalty. Scooping, pushing, or dragging the ball is prohibited and penalized two strokes. The current competition rules took effect on April 1, 2021.

== Courses ==
Target Bird Golf courses can be either permanent certified courses or temporary setups. The sport's flexible nature allows courses to be established in various environments, including parks, empty lots, wooded areas, and even locations with natural water features. Course designs adapt to local terrain, making use of natural obstacles and landscape features.

Notable early certified courses included Akagi Kuroho Club in Gunma Prefecture (established 1987), Seto Ohashi Friend Club in Kagawa Prefecture, and various municipal courses throughout Japan. The first municipal Target Bird Golf course was established at Ichinomiya Kanegawa no Mori in Yamanashi Prefecture in 1988, in preparation for the National Sports Recreation Festival.

== International spread ==
Beginning in 1999, Target Bird Golf has expanded beyond Japan through international exchange programs. Active promotion efforts, led by enthusiasts such as Hatano Ryoko of the Kanagawa Prefecture Target Bird Golf Association, have introduced the sport to:

- Hawaii, USA (1999) – through cooperation with Japanese American community organizations
- China (2002) – as part of Japan-China friendship recreational exchange events commemorating the 30th anniversary of diplomatic normalization
- Thailand (2003) – with the 1st Japan-Thailand International Exchange Tournament held in Chiang Mai in 2004
- Australia (2003)
- South Korea (2005)

The Japan Target Bird Golf Association continues to pursue international expansion, with goals of promoting the sport throughout Asia and eventually organizing regional Asian championships.

== Cultural significance ==
Target Bird Golf holds a unique position in Japanese sports culture as a homegrown sport designed specifically to address accessibility concerns. The sport embodies several Japanese cultural values:

- Lifelong Learning (生涯学習, shōgai gakushū): The sport enables continued participation throughout one's life, regardless of declining physical abilities
- Community Building: Local associations foster social connections, particularly among senior citizens
- Health Promotion: The sport is actively promoted by local governments and healthcare organizations as part of preventive care initiatives for the elderly
- Accessibility: Simple rules and affordable equipment make the sport welcoming to beginners

The motto of many Target Bird Golf associations – "Energetic, Fun, and Friendly" (元気で・楽しく・仲良く) – reflects the sport's emphasis on social enjoyment and well-being over intense competition.

== Governing organizations ==
The sport is overseen by several organizational tiers:

- Japan Target Bird Golf Association (日本ターゲット・バードゴルフ協会): National governing body established in 1988
- Target Bird Golf Promotion Association (一般社団法人ターゲットバードゴルフ普及会): Organization dedicated to promoting and expanding the sport
- Regional Block Councils: Six regional groupings that coordinate inter-prefectural activities
- Prefectural and Municipal Associations: Local organizations in 44+ prefectures and 350+ municipalities

== Legacy ==
Nojima Takashige, the inventor of Target Bird Golf, passed away on January 14, 2020. His creation has left a lasting impact on Japanese recreational sports culture, providing a unique Japanese-originated sport that continues to bring joy and healthy activity to tens of thousands of participants annually.

The sport represents a successful example of sports innovation driven by accessibility concerns, demonstrating how creative adaptation can make athletic pursuits available to broader populations. As of 2025, the sport continues to be featured at major events including the Nenrin Pick and various regional competitions throughout Japan.

== See also ==
- Golf
- Dart golf
- Disc golf
- Footgolf
- Miniature golf
- Park golf
