= SportAccord =

Sports event organisation based in Switzerland

- Predecessor: Global Association of International Sports Federations
- Type: Sports event organisation
- Headquarters: Lausanne, Switzerland
- President: Uğur Erdener
- Parent organisation: International Olympic Committee
- Website: www.sportaccord.sport

SportAccord is a global sports event organisation based in Lausanne, Switzerland, that is governed by stakeholders representing the Olympic and non-Olympic International Federations and has currently taken on some of the activities of the dissolved Global Association of International Sports Federations.

== History ==
SportAccord brings together International Federations and organisations involved in the business of sport with the aim to serve, promote and protect the common interests of its stakeholders, help them achieve their global objectives, and facilitate knowledge-sharing.

SportAccord's flagship event is the annual SportAccord World Sport & Business Summit, which was originally launched in 2003.

In addition to the Summit, SportAccord hosts the annual International Federation (IF) Forum, a closed-to-the-public event offering targeted thematic sessions specifically designed for International Sport Federations. The 2025 IF Forum was held at the Olympic Museum in Lausanne, and the 20th edition is scheduled for 5–7 October 2026, also in Lausanne.

Together with other events, SportAccord holds Multi-Sport Games, including the World Combat Games, World Mind Games, and World Urban Games which showcase both Olympic and non-Olympic sports and disciplines.

SportAccord has taken on and manages the .sport domain and the sustainability.sport platform, previously owned by GAISF.

Following the 2025 IF Forum, the SportAccord Executive Committee appointed Kelly Fairweather, a former IOC and International Federation executive, as Managing Director.

== SportAccord World Sport & Business Summit ==
SportAccord's annual World Sport & Business Summit is an international sport convention hosted over a week, combining an exhibition area, a themed conference programme and a multitude of networking events.

The event gathers hundreds of representatives from the sports industry including over 100 international sport federations, rights holders, organising committees, cities, press and media, businesses and other organisations involved in the development of sport.

Editions:

SAIC	Dates	Host city
1st	12–16 May 2003	Madrid, Spain
2nd	15–20 May 2004	Lausanne, Switzerland (#1)
3rd	16–20 April 2005	Berlin, Germany
4th	3–7 April 2006	Seoul, South Korea
5th	22–27 April 2007	Beijing, China
6th	2–6 June 2008	Athens, Greece
7th	23–27 March 2009	Denver, United States
8th	20–25 April 2010	Dubai, United Arab Emirates
9th	3–8 April 2011	London, United Kingdom
10th	20–25 May 2012	Quebec City, Canada
11th	26–31 May 2013	Saint Petersburg, Russia
12th	6–11 April 2014	Belek, Turkey
13th	19–24 April 2015	Sochi, Russia
14th	17–22 April 2016	Lausanne, Switzerland (#2)
15th	2–7 April 2017	Aarhus, Denmark
16th	15–20 April 2018	Bangkok, Thailand
17th	5–10 May 2019	Gold Coast, Australia
18th	7–11 April 2024	Birmingham, United Kingdom

- Note 1: The 2020 SportAccord World Sport & Business Summit in Beijing was cancelled, due to the COVID-19 pandemic.
- Note 2: The 18th SportAccord World Sport & Business Summit was postponed from November 2021 to May 2022.
- Note 3: The SportAccord summit in Yekaterinburg was cancelled following the Russian invasion of Ukraine.
- Note 4: GAISF was dissolved on 14 September 2023, prior to the SportAccord summit in Birmingham.
- Note 5: No Convention was held in 2025.[N5]
- Note 6: The 19th edition was originally scheduled for 24–28 May 2026 in Baku, after a Host City Agreement was signed in September 2025.[N6] It was postponed, and in May 2026 SportAccord announced it would instead take place in Baku on 9–13 May 2027.

== Stakeholders ==
The SportAccord Stakeholders represent more than 120 International Sport Federations and host their Annual General Assemblies at World Sport & Business Summit.

- ASOIF (Association of Summer Olympic International Federations)
- WOF (Winter Olympic Federations)
- ARISF (Association of IOC Recognised International Sports Federations)
- AIMS (Alliance of Independent Recognised Members of Sport)

The President and all the Members represent SportAccord's stakeholders and are elected for 4-year mandates.

== See also ==
- Association of Summer Olympic International Federations
- Winter Olympic Federations
- Association of IOC Recognised International Sports Federations
- International World Games Association
- Global Association of International Sports Federations
- List of international sports federations
