= Federation for International FootGolf =

World's governing body for the footgolf

Federation for International FootGolf (FIFG) has been advancing and developing FootGolf as a standardised global sport since 2012. Headquartered in Lausanne, Switzerland, FIFG promotes the global recognition and development of FootGolf, establishes and enforces standardised international rules, organises major competitions (including the FIFG World Cup, FIFG World Tour and FIFG Regional Tours), and regulates national member associations.

== History ==
Origins and early variants

For decades, games conceptually similar to FootGolf were played informally across the globe on beaches, farms, parks, and other open spaces. These informal variants emerged under a variety of local names, including Codeball, Footballgolf, foot-golf, Futgolf, Soccer-Golf, Kick-golf, Footee, and Buschball and operated under localised rules that often differed significantly from one another.

The modern standardised format of the game emerged in the Netherlands between 2008 and 2010 when Michael Jansen and Bas Korsten developed a rule set based on traditional golf. They subsequently organised the world’s first official tournament on a regulation golf course, establishing the foundational template that would later be adopted globally.

The International FootGolf Association and structural challenges

Although Michael Jansen and his business partners intended to lay the initial foundations for international governance by creating the International FootGolf Association (IFGA) during the 2009-2010 period, the transition from a localised concept into a structured international sport proved exceptionally difficult. Due to the overwhelming financial burdens of global distances and restrictive economics, the IFGA went dormant. To end confusion and potential organisational rivalries and unite the sport under a single banner, the IFGA officially recognised the Federation for International FootGolf (FIFG) as the sole global governing body for the sport. The FIFG recognised Michael Jansen as a co‑creator of the basic modern rules of the sport as it is played today and serves the organisation as an FIFG Ambassador and Honorary Board Member. CNN

Foundation and growth of the FIFG

The Federation for International FootGolf (FIFG) was formally established in 2012 by sports enthusiasts who united their resources to create a unified global governing body. The federation was publicly announced in June 2012 during the inaugural FootGolf World Cup held near Budapest, Hungary. Today the FIFG maintains its international headquarters at Place Saint‑François 7, 1003 Lausanne, Switzerland. While casual FootGolf is estimated to be played in over one hundred countries, the regulated competitive sport is strictly organised by multiple member countries under the FIFG framework.

Founding

The FIFG was founded by Roberto Balestrini, Laura Balestrini, and Francisco Gonzalez Briones from FIFG Region 1 – North America; Javier de Ancizar from FIFG Region 2 – South America; and Gábor Gelencser, Mauritz van Tubergen, and Leonardo Decaria from FIFG Region 3 – Europe. Working together to establish the FIFG as the sport’s international governing body, they coordinated with Hungary's Gábor Gelencser to host the first FIFG FootGolf World Cup near Budapest in June 2012, which featured 126 excited players from eight countries.

== Name and branding ==
The Federation for International FootGolf adopted and standardised the sport’s name under it's brand as a single word with a capital F and a capital G: FootGolf. Accordingly, the sport governed by FIFG rules and guidelines is officially identified as FootGolf, and the Federation for International FootGolf (FIFG) promotes the sport under this trademarked title, having published and periodically updated an official rulebook since 2012 to ensure uniform rules worldwide.

== Structure and leadership ==
FIFG is governed by a Board of Directors, which functions as the central decision-making body responsible for strategic direction, policy development, and oversight of the sport’s global administration. The board approves key initiatives, including rules and policies, through convened meetings where members deliberate on matters such as competition structures, membership criteria, and organisational reforms.

The board comprises defined leadership roles: President – leads overall operations and represents FIFG internationally 1st Vice President and 2nd Vice President – assist in executive duties and chair specific initiatives General Secretary – manages administrative affairs, including correspondence and record-keeping Treasurer – oversees financial matters Additional board members and advisors

Past presidents: Javier de Ancizar, Mauritz van Tubergen, Michael O'Connor, Roberto Balestrini, Gabor Gelencser, Laura Balestrini. Current president: Aleksander Kravanja

On October 3, 2017, the Global Association of International Sports Federations announced the federation as one of the first international federations to achieve Observer status.

That year also saw the introduction of FIFG Regional Majors and ranked tournaments, such as the FIFG 500 series, to promote sustained player development and event diversity across continents.

== Core responsibilities ==
Rule Standardisation: Establishes and maintains the Official FIFG Rulebook, guidelines, and player codes of conduct to guarantee consistent gameplay worldwide.

Global Tournaments: Organises the premier international competitions for the sport, including the official FootGolf Tours and the multi-category FootGolf World Cup.

National Affiliation: Dictates membership frameworks, recognising only one exclusive national organisation per country to govern local play.

Dispute Resolution: Exercises sole jurisdiction over resolving institutional conflicts or administrative disagreements between member countries or continental federations.

Sport Integrity & Anti-Doping: Protects the integrity of the sport by mandating strict ethical guidelines, combating corruption, and delivering anti-doping programmes in partnership with the International Testing Agency] (ITA).

Inclusivity & Growth: Sets mandatory criteria for its member nations to expand the sport at the grassroots level, specifically promoting the inclusion of women, youth, and athletes with disabilities.

References

- Organises official FootGolf Tours
- Organises the Footgolf World Cup
- Regulates member countries
- Sets the rules of the sport

== Members ==
The Federation for International FootGolf (FIFG) recognises only one exclusive member per country. Membership is restricted to a single national organisation that serves as the official governing body for the sport within its territory. Players are required to affiliate with the FIFG member organisation of their country of birth or permanent residence. Unrepresented countries may apply to initiate the formal membership process. To achieve official recognition, an applicant national organisation must satisfy requirements across four primary categories: governance, universality, ethics, and responsibility.

Governance

. Institutional Structure: The applicant must be a legally registered national organisation governed by a general assembly as its supreme decision‑making body.

. Administrative Principles: Organizations must implement principles of good governance, including transparency, accountability, gender equity, non‑discrimination, and institutional fairness.

Universality and Development

. Domestic Competition: The organisation must actively develop the sport by hosting a minimum of three tournaments annually, distributed across at least two distinct golf courses.

. International Integration: Scheduled events must attract a significant field of competitive players who are formally affiliated with existing FIFG member countries.

Ethics and Responsibility

. Inclusivity and Safety: Member organisations must promote inclusive participation—specifically for women and individuals with disabilities, while supporting "sport for all" initiatives. They are required to uphold high-standard officiating, clear competition rules, fair play, and athlete health and safety protocols.

. Anti-Doping Compliance: The organisation must be a signatory to the World Anti‑Doping Code, maintain domestic anti‑doping regulations aligned with the Code, and actively participate in anti-doping initiatives.

. Integrity Safeguards: Organisations must implement formal frameworks to protect athletes and sports personnel from corruption, fraudulent activities, illegal or irregular sports betting, and other malicious practices.

The combined criteria ensure that each recognised national federation operates with high institutional integrity, fosters inclusive growth, and strictly aligns with international standards for clean and ethical sport.

FIFG Continental Regions

Region 1: North America

Region 2: South America

Region 3: Europe

Region 4: Asia & Oceania

Region 5: Africa

== Player Affiliations ==
Players are not FIFG Members. A player may affiliate to only one FIFG Member Country by citizenship or residence.

Players from countries with a non-active member must contact the FIFG and complete the form requesting to join official competitions. FORM

== FIFG FootGolf World Cup ==
The FIFG FootGolf World Cup is the premier international tournament for the sport of FootGolf, which combines elements of soccer and golf. The championship brings together the best FootGolf players from around the world to compete in different categories, including men’s individual, women’s individual, seniors, and national team events (national selections).

The 1st FIFG World Cup was played in Budapest, Hungary, in June 2012, organised by the FootGolf Hungary. It featured 126 players from eight countries: Argentina, Belgium, Greece, Hungary, Italy, Mexico, the Netherlands, and the United States.

The 2nd FIFG FootGolf World Cup was held in January 2016 in Pilar (Buenos Aires Province) Argentina. Organised by the Asociación Argentina de FootGolf, the event hosted over 230 players from 26 FIFG member countries.

The 3rd FIFG FootGolf World Cup, organised by the French FootGolf Association, was played in Marrakesh, Morocco in 2018 and attracted 520 players from 33 countries.

The 4th FIFG FootGolf World Cup was organised by the American FootGolf Federation in 2023 in Orlando, Florida, United States. The event brought together 972 players from 39 countries.

The 5th FIFG FootGolf World Cup was organised by the Federación Mexicana de FootGolf in Acapulco, Mexico, in 2026. The tournament gathered more than 1,200 players from over 60 countries and 64 national teams across all categories, making it the largest edition in the competition’s history.

== FIFG Youth FootGolf ==
The inaugural FIFG Youth FootGolf World Cup was played in Germany in 2026.

In 2025 American FootGolf League worked with the NJ Youth Soccer Association and Crystal Springs Resort to launch a FootGolf championship for youth in New Jersey. In 2026, the NJYSA expands the second annual Youth FootGolf Championship successfully and introduced interactive activities for both parents and friends.

The American FootGolf League launched the U.S. Youth FootGolf Development Program to expand the game to youth across the United States, including supporting programmes that target players with disabilities. Home
