= International Union of Kettlebell Lifting =

International sports association

- Sport: Kettlebell
- Membership: 63 countries
- Abbreviation: IUKL
- Founded: August 2007
- Headquarters: Talsi, Latvia
- President: (Estonia) Igor Solodov

Official website
- giri-iukl.com

The International Union of Kettlebell Lifting (IUKL), is an international association which brings together around 40 national federations of kettlebell sport worldwide.

Kettlebell lifting is a weightlifting sport practiced with kettlebells of fixed weights (24 kg for women and 32 kg for men) and each sport consists of a maximum number of lifts in a fixed time. The development of the sport came from Eastern Europe.

== History ==
The European Union of Kettlebell Lifting (EUWL) was created in 1992 from five Eastern European countries: Estonia, Lithuania, Russia, Ukraine and Belarus. The headquarters of the organisation is based in the town of Talsi, in Latvia. The EUWL became the first official international organisation in the field of kettlebell lifting, with the idea of developing a European movement. Three European championships were organised with the participation of four countries in 2002.

In May 2006, in Riga, Latvia, an extraordinary congress took place to decide to accept a number of new members to the European Union - Latvia and Moldova.

In August 2007, the decision was made to make the movement international and to become the International Union of Kettlebell Lifting. Since 2008, due to its new status, IUKL organises the World Championships.

In September 2009, at the General Assembly of TAFISA, the IUKL became a member. The organisation has had observer status at the Global Association of International Sports Federations since October 2017.

== Member associations ==
In 2016, the federation had around 40 members. Two other organisations, International Kettlebell and Strength Training Academy (IKSA) and Johann Martin Academie (JMA), are also members.

South Ossetia also has its own delegation.

Africa	Americas	Asia-Oceania	Europe
Members
Cameroon (Strongman and Plural Sports Academy); Mauritius (Kettlebell Lifting Federation, Mauritius); Nigeria (Nigeria Kettlebell Lifting Association)	Argentina (Kettlebell Latinoamerica); Brazil (Brasil Kettlebell Club); Canada (Canadian Kettlebell Alliance); Chile (Pesa Rusa Chile); Costa Rica (Kettlebell Alliance of Costa Rica); Dominican Republic (Dominican Republic Kettlebell); Mexico (Mexican Kettlebell Alliance); Puerto Rico (Puerto Rico Kettlebells); United States (USA Kettlebell Lifting); Venezuela (Venezuela Kettlebell Alliance)	Australia (Association "Girevoy Sport Australia"); Bangladesh (Bangladesh Kettlebell Lifting Federation); China (China Kettlebell Lifting Federation); India (Kettlebell Sport India Association); Indonesia (Sporting organization "Kettlebell Indonesia"); Iran (Iran Kettlebell Committee); Japan (Japan Association of Russian Kettlebell); Jordan (Integrated Functional Training); Kazakhstan (Federation of Kettlebell Lifting and Armwrestling of Kazakhstan Republic); Kyrgyzstan (Federation of Kettlebell Lifting of Kyrgyz Republic); Malaysia (Kettlebell Malaysia); Mongolia (Mongolian Amateur Kettlebell Federation); Nepal (Nepal Kettlebell); New Zealand (New Zealand Girevoy Sport Alliance); Pakistan (Pakistan Kettlebell Sport Federation); Philippines (Kettlebellista Fitness Center); Singapore (Kettlebell Singapore); South Korea (Korean Federation of Kettlebell Lifting); South Ossetia (Federation of Kettlebell Lifting of South Ossetia); Taiwan (Taiwan Kettlebell Sport Association); Uzbekistan (Federation of Athletic Games and Kettlebell Lifting of Uzbekistan)	Bulgaria (Sports club "Lokomotive be strong kettlebell club"); Belgium (Belgian Kettlebell Federation); Croatia (Croatian Girevoy Sport Federation); Czechia (Czech Kettlebell Club); Denmark (Dansk Kettlebell Sport Union); England (Organisation of Kettlebell Sport England); Estonia (Estonian Union of Kettlebell Lifting); Finland (Finnish Weightlifting Federation); France (Fédération Française de Force); Germany (Bundesverband Deutscher Kettlebell Sportler e.V.); Greece (Panhellenic Federation of Bodybuilding and Fitness); Hungary (Kettlebell Sport Club of Kecskemét); Ireland (All-Ireland Kettlebell Lifting Federation); Italy (Cross & Functional Academy); Latvia (Latvian Kettlebell Lifting Association); Lithuania (Lithuanian Kettlebell Lifting Federation); Netherlands (Kettlebell Sport Bond Nederland); Norway (Norges Girya – og Kettlebellsforbund); Poland (Polska Federacja Sportów Odważnikowych); Portugal (Portugal Kettlebell Club); Russia (All-Russian Kettlebell Lifting federation); Serbia (Girevoy Sport Pećinci); Slovakia (Girya Academy Performance Slovakia); Slovenia (Slovenian Kettlebell Club); Spain (Asociacion Española de Pesas Rusas); Sweden (Uddevalla Kettlebell Club); Switzerland (Kettlebell Lifting Schweiz); Ukraine (Union of Kettlebell Lifting of Ukraine); Wales (Kettlebell Sport Wales)
