= 141st IOC Session =

Meeting of the International Olympic Committee in Mumbai

The 141st IOC Session was an IOC Session that was held in Mumbai, India from 15 to 17 October 2023.

== Bidders ==
Mumbai stood as the only bidder to host the session. The IOC membership approved Mumbai's application during the 2022 Winter Olympics in Beijing. This marked the second time an IOC Session was held in India. The 86th IOC Session in 1983 was held in New Delhi. Due to several problems related to Indian Olympic Association, the session was delayed to October 2023.

The session was originally scheduled for May 2023 but was postponed to October amid internal disputes, governance shortcomings, and court cases involving the Indian Olympic Association. The IOC warned that failure to hold elections and resolve the governance issues could lead to the suspension of the association and relocation of the session.

== Agenda ==
Several items were on the agenda during the three-day IOC Session. The host city for the 2030 Winter Olympics was initially going to be selected at this session, but the IOC pushed that date back to 2024.

=== Optional Sports for 2028 Summer Olympics ===
The IOC added five new sports for the program of the 2028 Summer Olympics in Los Angeles.

In August 2022, it was confirmed that nine sports had bid to be included in the games, with presentations made later that month. They were:

- Cricket (International Cricket Council)
- Break-dancing (World DanceSport Federation)
- Baseball/softball (World Baseball Softball Confederation)
- Flag Football (International Federation of American Football)
- Lacrosse (World Lacrosse)
- Karate (World Karate Federation)
- Kickboxing (World Association of Kickboxing Organizations)
- Squash (World Squash Federation)
- Motorsport (Fédération Internationale de l'Automobile)

In October 2023, it was announced that the LA28 Olympic Organizing Committee announced that 5 sports were officially proposed to the IOC for the 2028 games, those being Flag Football, Cricket, Lacrosse, Squash, and Baseball/Softball. On October 16, the IOC membership approved the inclusion of the additional sports.

=== Election of new IOC members ===
New IOC members were elected at this session. The following individuals were elected:

- (Israel) Yael Arad
- (Hungary) Balázs Fürjes
- (Peru) Cecilia Roxana Tait Villacorta
- (Malaysia) Michelle Yeoh
- (Germany) Michael Mronz
- (Sweden) Petra Sörling
- (South Korea) Kim Jae-youl
- (Tunisia) Mehrez Boussayene

== Proposed extension of Thomas Bach's term ==
During the session, several IOC members called for IOC president Thomas Bach to remain in office after the end of his second term in 2025 and proposed amending the Olympic Charter to permit an unprecedented third term. Under the Charter, the IOC presidency was limited to a first term of eight years and a second term of four years. The term limit had been introduced as part of anti-corruption reforms following the Salt Lake City bid scandal.

The proposal drew negative media attention v=because it raised the possibility that the IOC could override one oif the safeguards adopted following the Salt Lake City corruption scandal. Batch initially said that the proposal would be discussed internally and did not rule out remaining in office beyond 2025. The following day, he said that term limits were necessary. At the 142nd IOC Session in August 2024, Bach announced that he would not seek an extension of his term.

== Attendance of Canadian IOC members ==
IOC member Tricia Smith and honorary IOC member Richard Pound are both Canadian citizens holding Canadian passports. Following the 2023 Canada–India diplomatic crisis, India announced that it would not grant visas to Canadian citizens after Prime Minister Justin Trudeau alleged Indian government involvement in the murder of Sikh separatist Hardeep Singh Nijjar, who was a Canadian citizen. The IOC confirmed that they were following up on the situation concerning visas for Canadian citizens.
