= Petra Sörling =

Swedish sports administrator

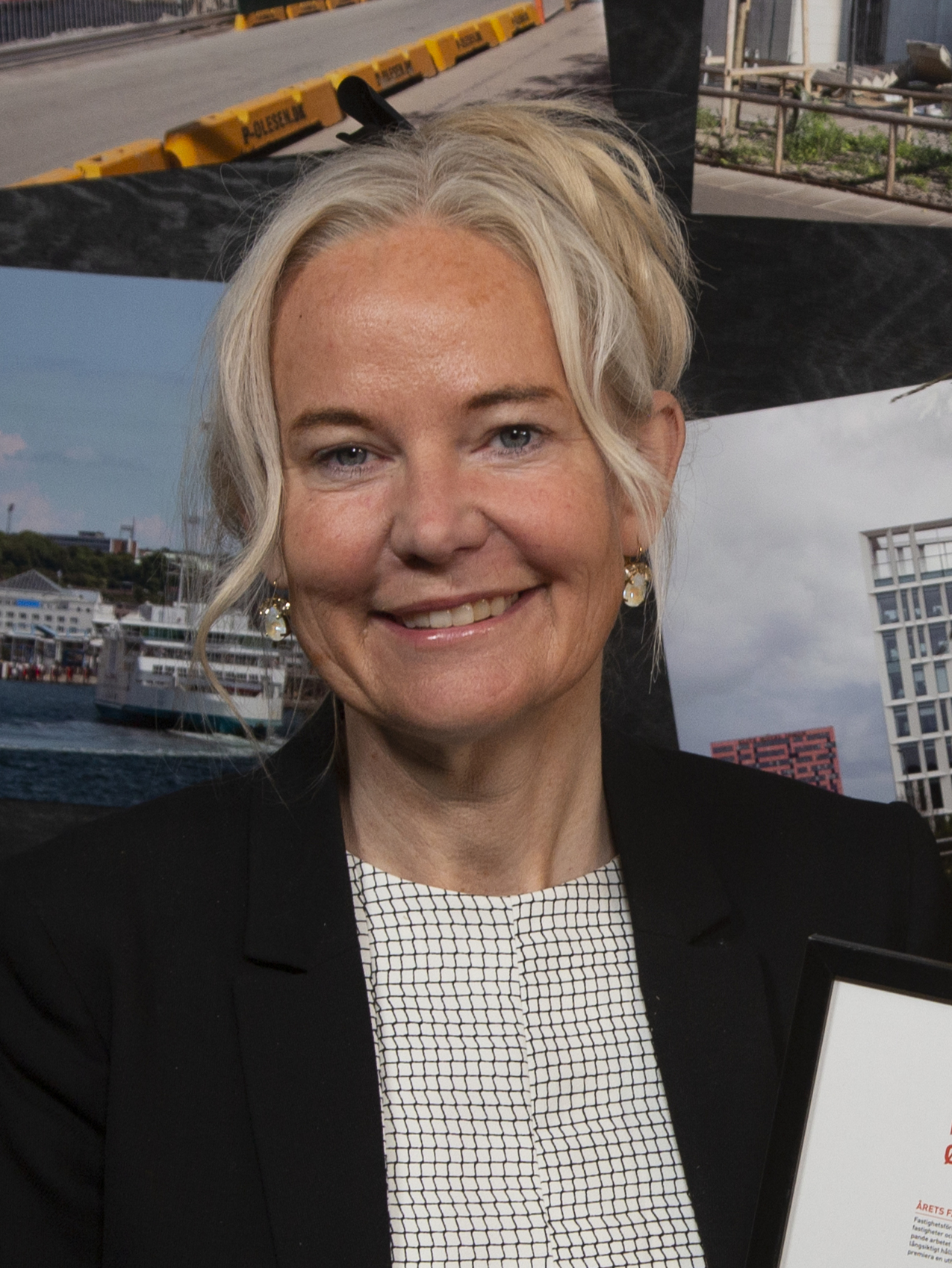
- Sörling in 2021
- Born: 12 January 1971 (age 55)
- Occupations: Sports official; business executive

Petra Erika Gummesson Sörling (born 12 January 1971) is a Swedish business executive and sports administrator. She has been the President of the International Table Tennis Federation since 2021 and a member of the International Olympic Committee since 2023.

== Early life and education ==
Sörling has a BSc in Business & Administration from Lund University and a degree in Management & Leadership from Stockholm School of Economics.

== Career ==
Outside of sports, Sörling has a career in the real estate, construction and urban planning industry. She has been CEO of Rosengård Real Estate since the company was founded in 2017.

== Sports administration ==
Petra Sörling has been a board member of the International Table Tennis Federation since 2009. Between 2013 and 2021 she was the ITTF vice president of finance. During the period 2013–2022 she was chairwoman of the Swedish Table Tennis Association. Since 2021 she has been a board member of the Swedish Olympic Committee where she is now the vice president.

On 24 November 2021, Petra Sörling was elected President of the International Table Tennis Federation. She became the federation's eighth President and the first woman to hold the position.

On 17 October 2023, at the 141st IOC Session held in Mumbai, India, Sörling, was elected as a Member of the IOC. She is the first ITTF President to become an IOC member. At the IOC, Sörling served on the Gender Equality, Diversity and Inclusion commission, the Sustainability and Legacy commission and the Gender Equality Working Group of the Esport Commission.

Sörling also served on the European Table Tennis Union and is a board member of the WADA foundation, the ASOIF Council and SportAccord.

In May 2025, Sörling was re-elected for another 4 years as ITTF President after winning a controversial voting process 104–102. Sörling received only 87 votes from the members who were present, while Khalil al-Mohannadi received 98 votes. According to the morning roll call, 16 members were supposed to vote online, but that number ultimately reached 21 without noticing the voters. Qatar Table Tennis Association and Khalil Al-Mohannadi filed appeals, but the ITTF Tribunal dismissed the appeals.

During Sörling's presidency, ITTF faced the biggest financial losses in its history, recording a $14.4 million loss in 2025, while spending more than 20% on administrative costs, including salaries and bonuses, and spending just 1.6% on the developmental projects.

== Personal life ==
Sörling is a table tennis player herself and won the 2018 World Championship in Masters Women's doubles.
