= Ingmar De Vos =

Belgian sports administrator

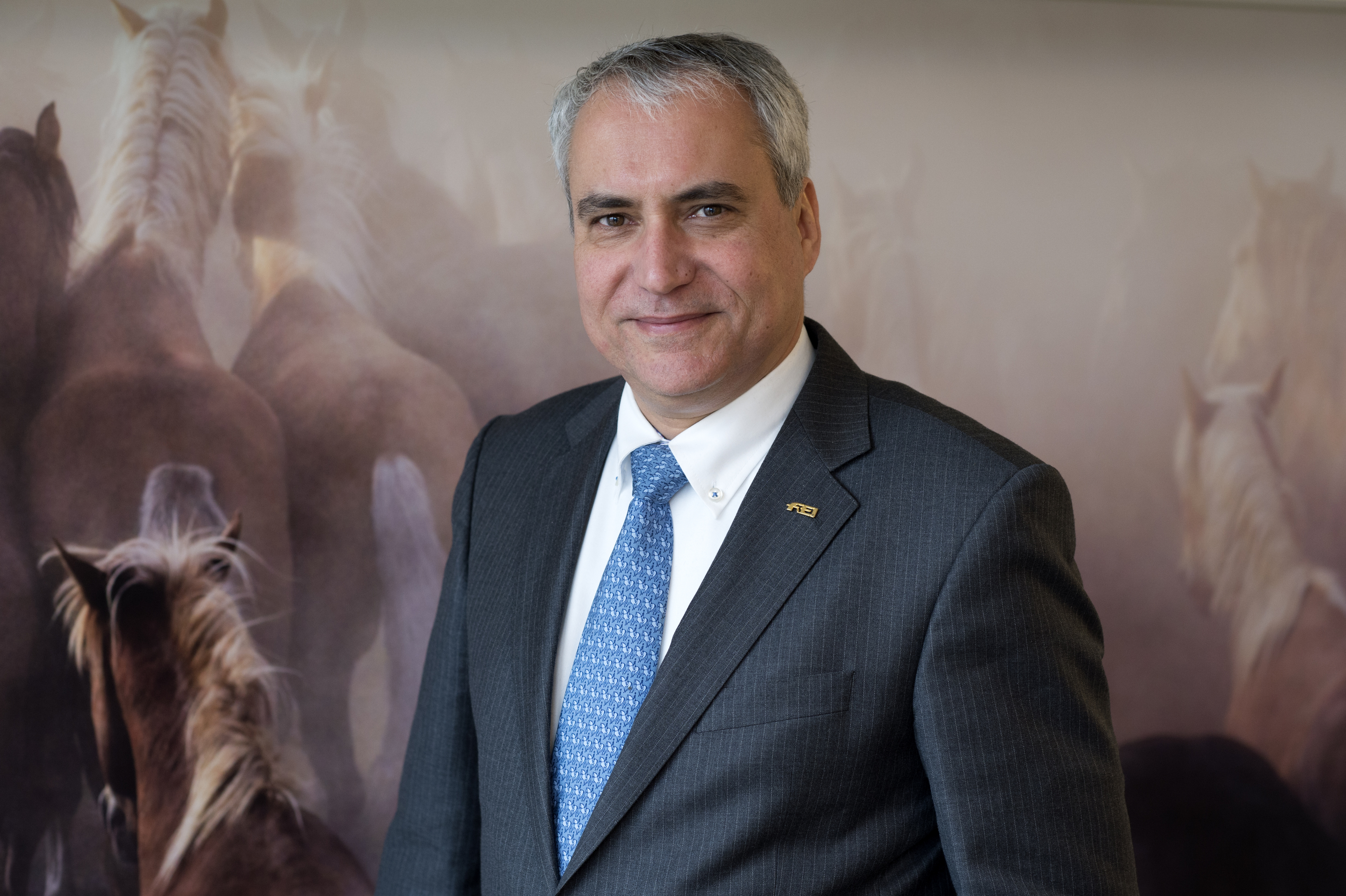

13th President of the Fédération Equestre Internationale
- Incumbent
- Assumed office 14 December 2014
- Preceded by: HRH Princess Haya

Personal details
- Born: 5 August 1963 (age 63)
- Spouse: Sabine Cox
- Children: Olivier, Philippe, Jacco and Flo

Ingmar De Vos (born 5 August 1963) is a Belgian professional sports manager serving as the thirteenth and current President of the International Federation for Equestrian Sports (Fédération Equestre Internationale) (FEI). He is also a member of the International Olympic Committee (IOC) and currently serves as President of the Association of Summer Olympic International Federations (ASOIF). Educated in sports management, business administration and international law, he began his career in mainstream politics before working for the Belgian Equestrian Federation and supported that nation's equestrian teams at the Olympics and the FEI World Equestrian Games. He was one of the founders of the European Equestrian Federation and became secretary-general of the FEI in 2011 prior to being elected President of the organisation in 2014.

== Education and career ==
Studying at Vrije Universiteit Brussel (V.U.B), De Vos began his university education gaining master's degrees in Political Science (department International Relations) and International and European Law. He also studied business administration and later went on to gain further degrees including Sports Management from the Belgian Olympic Academy.

Following completion of his Masters in International and European law, De Vos joined the Belgian Senate, as an advisor to the Liberal Group.

== Equestrian organisation management career ==
Ingmar De Vos began his career within Equestrian Sports Management in 1990 at the Belgian Equestrian Federation, first taking on the role of managing director which was later combined with the Secretary General role. In his time at the Belgian Equestrian, De Vos was successful in modernising the organisation and administration including the restructuring of the organisation to allow the regional federations to receive government funding.

Alongside his core responsibilities as managing director and Secretary General, De Vos was also Head of the Belgian Equestrian Delegation at the Olympic Games from 2000 to 2008 in Sydney, Athens and Beijing as well as heading up the Belgian Delegation at the first five FEI World Equestrian Games between 1990 and 2010. He is also on the board of the Belgian National Olympic Committee.

He was co-founder of the European Equestrian Federation (EEF) in 2010 and was also Secretary General from 2010 until 2011, when he joined the Fédération Equestre Internationale (FEI), world governing body for horse sport.

== Fédération Equestre Internationale ==
Ingmar De Vos joined the FEI as Secretary General in 2011 during the second presidential term of HRH Princess Haya. During his time as Secretary General he worked closely with HRH Princess Haya, implementing a number of reforms to improve lines of communication with the National Federations and stakeholders. One of the key steps in this process was the creation of the FEI Sports Forum in 2012 to provide a platform for all stakeholders to discuss matters relating to the sport in an open and transparent manner.

He was also instrumental in the restructuring of FEI's Commercial strategy which subsequently resulted in the signing of the organisation's biggest commercial deal with the Swiss watchmakers, Longines.

Following the decision of FEI President HRH Princess Haya not to run for a third term, Ingmar De Vos stepped forward as one of six candidates. The Presidential election took place at the 2014 FEI General Assembly in Baku, Azerbaijan where De Vos was elected in the first round of voting. A total of 131 National Federations voted:

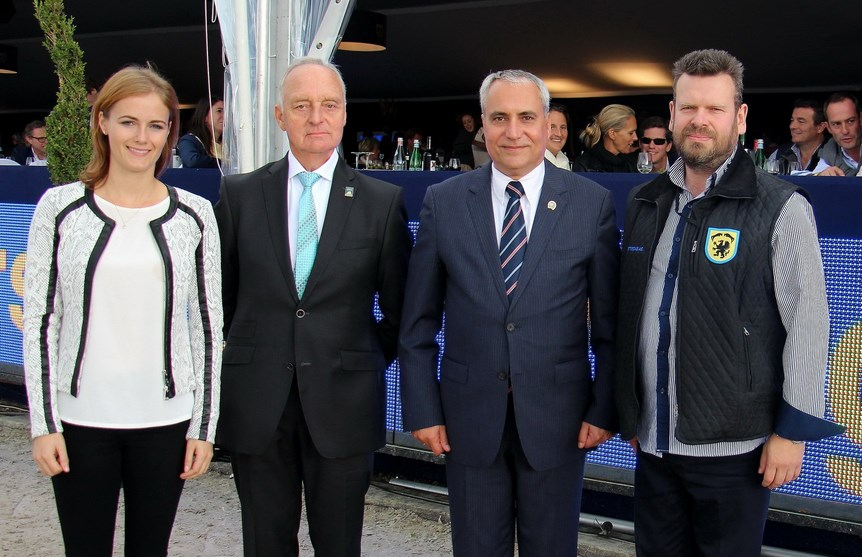
FEI World Breeding Jumping Championships for Young Horses, Lanaken (2015) from the left: Judy Ann Melchior, Rik Van Miert (WBFSH), Ingmar De Vos (FEI), J. Pijarowski (KSPSK)

Presidential Candidate	Votes
Ingmar De Vos (BEL)	98
Pierre Durand (FRA)	21
Pierre Genecand (SUI)	6
John McEwen (GBR)	6

Note: The two other candidates, Ulf Helgstrand (DEN) and Javier Revuelta del Peral (ESP) withdrew from the election process prior to the vote.

Ingmar De Vos' Presidential manifesto focused on five main pillars: "Serving our community", "Sport: our core business", "Equestrian Sport in the Olympics", "FEI Solidarity" and "Horses as our Partners". These five pillars will serve as his blueprint for the four-year presidential term. De Vos' manifesto speech prior to his election can be seen here.

As FEI President, De Vos has been very active; he attended Australian Sport Achievement Awards Night in July 2015 and in the same month visited the Bulgarian Federation Summer Camp supported by FEI Solidarity.

On 7 December, an FEI delegation composed of Ingmar De Vos, Sabrina Ibáñez, FEI Secretary General, John Madden, FEI 1st vice-president and Chair of the Jumping Committee and Frank Kemperman, Member of the executive board and Chair of the Dressage Committee were received at Al-Safriya Palace by His Royal Highness Prince Salman bin Hamad Al Khalifa. De Vos presented King Hamad with the first FEI Decoration in recognition of his pioneering role and dedicated efforts to promote the equestrian sport, preserve its heritage and support FEI governing body.

On 20 November 2018, during its General Assembly held in Manama (BRN), Ingmar De Vos, uncontested candidate, was re-elected as FEI President for a four-year terms. In a powerful acceptance speech. after an extended standing ovation from the delegates, De Vos once again expressed his belief in "our sport, in our community and in our potential". He continued by saying that these are exciting times for equestrian, with a fan base which is clearly diversifying, and seven unique disciplines to promote concluding with, "the sky really is the limit!"

On 13 November 2022, De Vos was re-elected to serve a third and final term as FEI President with an overwhelming majority. The presidential election took place during the FEI Hybrid General Assembly held in Cape Town (RSA) and virtually, allowing National Federations unable to attend in-person to vote online in real time. Standing unopposed for a second time, the 59-year-old received widespread support for his last four-year term, which will run until 2026.

== Association of Summer Olympic International Federations (ASOIF) ==
De Vos is currently President of the Association of Summer Olympic International Federations (ASOIF), ), having taken office on 1 January 2025 following his unanimous election at the 48th ASOIF General Assembly held on 9 April 2024 in Birmingham (GBR), during the SportAccord World Sport and Business Summit. He ran unopposed and was elected by secret ballot for a four-year term.

De Vos has been a member of the ASOIF Governance Task Force since 2016 and joined the ASOIF Council in April 2019.

He became a member of the WADA Executive Committee and Foundation Board in 2018 representing the Olympic Movement. After the governance reform of WADA in 2022, De Vos remained member of the WADA Executive Committee.

On 2 December 2025, Ingmar De Vos was appointed to the International Testing Agency (ITA) Foundation Board as representative of the International Federations. His term in office will begin on 1 January 2026.

== International Olympic Committee ==
First elected IOC Member on 15 September 2017 for an eight-year term during the IOC Session in Lima, De Vos has actively contributed to the work of the IOC, currently serving on the Legal Affairs Commission and the Los Angeles 2028 Coordination Commission, and previously on the Digital and Technology Commission.

He was re-elected for a second term as a Member of the International Olympic Committee (IOC) at the 144th IOC Session held in Costa Navarino (GRE) on 21 March 2025.

The 144th IOC Session also approved a change in the nature of his membership, transitioning it from being linked to his role as FEI President to one based on his position as President of the Association of Summer Olympic International Federations (ASOIF).

Ingmar De Vos has been an active member of numerous IOC commissions.

He has served on the Legal Affairs Commission since 2018 and was a member of the Digital and Technology Commission from 2018 to 2019. Since 2019, he has been member of the Coordination Commission for the Los Angeles 2028 Olympic Games and served on the Women in Sport Commission from 2019 to 2021. He joined the Gender Equality, Diversity and Inclusion Commission in 2022 and became a member of the IPACS Steering Committee in 2024. In 2025, he was appointed to several additional commissions, including Olympic Channel Services SA (Switzerland), the Future Host Commission for the Games of the Olympiad, the Revenues and Commercial Partnerships Commission, the Coordination Commission for the Brisbane 2032 Olympic Games, and the Games Optimisation Group.

On 4 February 2026, Ingmar De Vos was elected to the IOC Executive Board by the 145th IOC Session in his quality as ASOIF President.

== Other organisations ==
In December 2021, he was appointed Sport Accord, Executive Committee Member representing first Global Association of International Sports Federations GAISF and since the dissolution of GAISF representing ASOIF.

In March 2017, he became a UN International Gender Champions (IGC), joining a leadership network that brings together female and male decision-makers determined to break down gender barriers and make gender equality a working reality in their spheres of influence.

In 2014, he was a delegate to the International Horse Sports Confederation (IHSC), an umbrella body created by the FEI and the International Federation of Horseracing Authorities (IFHA) – the first formal vehicle for cooperation between the world's leading governing bodies for equestrian sport. He was the organisation’s Vice President (2014-2019 and 2022-2024) and President from 2020 to 2022. He was re-elected to the IHSC presidency on 6 December 2024 at the organisation’s General Assembly in Hong Kong for the last two years of his term in office as the FEI President.
