= Fungo golf =

Fungo golf is a game involving two or more players in which they use fungo bats and baseballs and their object is to hit certain objects at a field. Fungo golf is played very similar to golf, where the player with the fewest strokes after a certain number of holes (typically nine or eighteen) wins the game. While there is no concrete history of how fungo golf was created, it has spread throughout America as a popular game especially with baseball players and coaches.

== Method of play ==
To figure out who shoots first, players usually throw or roll a baseball to a certain object (usually at close range) and whoever is closest shoots first. The first person then gets to choose the first hole and tees off. To tee off (and for most shots) players hit the ball like they were playing baseball, but depending on the distance from the hole the player may choose to ‘putt’ the ball instead of hitting it. To putt the ball, the player places the ball on the cup (the end of the fungo bat), and can toss the ball from the cup in hopes of getting a more accurate shot. In shooting or putting, the player must have one foot where the ball landed during the entire duration of their swing or putt, failure to keep the foot planted results in a loss of a stroke. Scorekeeping is identical to traditional golf; the player with the fewest strokes essentially wins the hole. Players traditionally play nine or eighteen holes of fungo golf, and at the end the person with the fewest strokes in the set number of holes wins the game.

Another variation of playing is setting a target (i.e. home plate), and that is the hole for the entire game. For the entire game players go to a different part of the field and try to hit home plate in the fewest strokes. To make the game more interesting players can create certain hazards or obstacles that the players must avoid hitting while making their shot. If a player hits a certain hazard then they may be penalized one stroke, a player can also lose a stroke if he loses their ball while taking a shot.

Players can also create complex holes such as ‘two-part holes’ where the players must hit or reach one object before attempting to shoot at the hole. For example, a ‘two-part hole’ could consist of hitting the scoreboard first, and then once they have hit the scoreboard they must hit the ball back to home plate, that would be one hole with the player with the fewest strokes winning the hole. ‘Two-part holes’ are typically saved for the last hole in order to make things more complex and difficult on the leader.

If there is a tie, the players are forced to play in sudden death where the winner of the next hole wins the game. The two players can agree upon a hole for the sudden death round, or if there is a player who is not playing they may choose the hole. The players will keep playing until there is a winner.
