= Winter Olympic Federations =

Nonprofit sports organisation

WOF
- Winter Olympic Federations
- Abbreviation: WOF
- Formation: 1976; 50 years ago
- Type: Nonprofit organisation
- Headquarters: Lausanne, Switzerland
- President: Ivo Ferriani
- Parent organisation: International Olympic Committee

The Winter Olympic Federations (WOF), formerly Association of International Olympic Winter Sports Federations (AIOWF), is a nonprofit organisation of international sports federations that compete in the Winter Olympic Games.

Among other tasks, the WOF encourages cooperation among its members and is in charge of coordinating the competition calendar. The WOF is the qualified spokesperson dealing with specific issues related to winter sports in general and the Winter Olympic Games in particular.

From its establishment to 2000, it was named Association of International Winter Sports Federations (AIWF). It added "Olympic" in its title in 2000, to become AIOWF. It again renamed itself on 14 November 2023 to WOF. Its current president is Ivo Ferriani, Honorary President of the International Bobsleigh and Skeleton Federation and it is headquartered in Lausanne, Switzerland.

== WOF Council ==
The Council is composed of a President and four Members, all from different Federations. One of the five Members is elected as secretary general. The President and all the Members are elected for 4-year mandates. The Treasurer is nominated by the Council on the proposal of the President as an executive position. The Treasurer is also on the Council, but without voting rights.

Designation	Name	Country	Sport Federation
President	Ivo Ferriani	Italy	International Bobsleigh and Skeleton Federation (Honorary President)
Secretary General	Colin Grahamslaw	United Kingdom	World Curling
Council Members	Einars Fogelis	Latvia	International Luge Federation
Council Members	Kim Jae-youl	South Korea	International Skating Union
Council Members	Beau Welling	United States	World Curling
Council Members	Alexander Ospelt	Liechtenstein	International Ski and Snowboard Federation
Treasurer	Fredi Schmid	Switzerland	International Skating Union

== Members ==
International sports federations that govern a sport in the programme of the Winter Olympic Games are members of the WOF. As of March 2025, it has seven full members and one associate member.

=== Full members ===
Sport	International federation	Acronym	National associations	Year founded	President	Official website	Notes
Biathlon	International Biathlon Union	IBU	61	1993	(Slovenia) Tim Farcnik	biathlonworld.com	
Bobsleigh & Skeleton	International Bobsleigh and Skeleton Federation	IBSF	74	1923	(Germany) Heike Groesswang	ibsf.org	
Curling	World Curling		71	1966	(United States) Beau Welling	worldcurling.org	
Ice hockey	International Ice Hockey Federation	IIHF	84	1908	(Germany) Franz Reindl	iihf.com	
Luge	International Luge Federation	FIL	53	1957	(Latvia) Einars Fogelis	fil-luge.org	
Ice skating	International Skating Union	ISU	101	1892	(South Korea) Kim Jae-youl	isu.org	
Skiing & Snowboarding	International Ski and Snowboard Federation	FIS	132	1924	(Liechtenstein) Alexander Ospelt	fis-ski.com	

=== Associate members ===
Sport	International federation	Acronym	National associations	Year founded	President	Official website	Notes
Ski mountaineering	International Ski Mountaineering Federation	ISMF	55	2008	(Switzerland) Regula Meier	ismf-ski.com	(Note: Also a member of Association of IOC Recognised International Sports Federations (ARISF).)

== See also ==
- Association of Summer Olympic International Federations
- International Olympic Committee
- Association of IOC Recognised International Sports Federations
- SportAccord
- International World Games Association
- List of international sports federations
