= Dart golf =

Variant of dart game

Golfing dart game apparatus by Howard J. Hanson, US Patent 5197743, March 30, 1993.

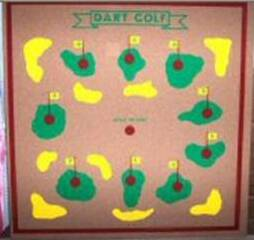
Apex dart golf board.

Dart golf games are games in which darts are thrown at traditional dart boards or dart boards that resemble golf courses with colored areas that represent a golf course. Dart golf games use golf-like rules and scoring. Rules and board configurations of the game vary from league to league, but are generally played single, head-to-head or with teams.

== History ==
Dart golf games have been known since as early as 1932 based on Harrison Johnston UK Patent submission. Later, NODOR produced an 18-hole golf dartboard and another dartboard called PAR DARTS.

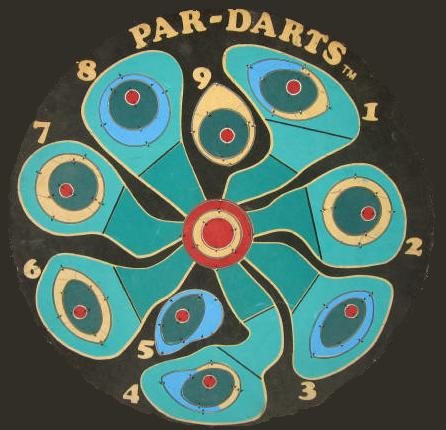
PAR DARTS dartboard.

Further, there was a patent filed in 1997 by Howard Hanson for a dartboard where the numbers are in a different order than the standard dartboard to make playing golf on the board more like playing a golf course. Finally, Dolf was developed on September 1, 1999 in Winnipeg, Manitoba, Canada by Keith Meyer and Michael Meyer where a golf like game is played on a standard dart board. Dolf is regulated by the World Dolf Federation (WDFF) with representation in Canada and Pakistan.

== Darts and dartboards ==
The dartboards used to play dart golf games consist of 3 major categories. First are dartboards that are representations of golf courses. Second are dartboards that are very similar to traditional dartboards but are arranged differently in order to make playing golf on the board more representative of playing golf. The final category is playing dart golf games on traditional dartboards.

The rules of the dart golf games vary. Typically for the dartboards that are representation of golf courses, the player's score is determined by where in the area defining the hole the dart lands. In general, if the player lands closer to the hole they will have a better score. For dart golf games that are played on either traditional dartboards or dartboards that are derivatives of traditional dartboards, the scoring is derived from landing the darts in the number related to the hole the player is on, the double, the treble, the 25 and the bull's eye such as Halex's Golf, A1Darts' Golf, Dolf and Apex Golf.

Scoring example in the dart golf game of Dolf

== See also ==
- Darts
- Variations of golf
- Cricket (darts)
- Lawn darts
