= Ben Clarke (footgolf) =

English FootGolf player

Personal information
- Nationality: English
- Citizenship: United Kingdom
- Born: 1991 (age 34–35) Berkhamsted, Hertfordshire, England
- Occupation: Footgolf player
- Years active: 2015–present

Sport
- Sport: Footgolf
- Club: Gatwick FootGolf
- Turned pro: 2017

Ben Clarke (born 1991) is an English professional FootGolf player. He is a four-time FootGolf World Tour champion and has consistently ranked among the top three players globally since 2020.

== Early life ==
Clarke was a physical education teacher in Hertfordshire before discovering FootGolf in 2014. He began playing competitively after being encouraged at a local course and quickly transitioned from amateur football to full-time FootGolf.

== Footgolf career ==
Clarke turned professional in 2017 after leaving his teaching job. Since then, he has competed globally across Europe, North and South America, and the Asia-Pacific region. He has represented the United Kingdom in international team events, including the European Championship and Jansen Cup.

=== Professional achievements ===
Clarke first gained international attention by winning his third consecutive FootGolf World Tour title in 2019, securing victories across the World, UK, and European Tours. He won 11 tournaments during the 2019 World Tour season and finished the final event, the Argentinian Open, at 20 under par. Clarke has competed against notable former professional footballers such as Roberto Ayala and Evgeniy Levchenko.

He has also represented the United Kingdom in team events, finishing as a runner-up individually and with Team UK at the 2018 Federation for International FootGolf (FIFG) World Cup.

=== Recent performance ===
From 2020 onward, Clarke has consistently ranked among the top three FootGolf players globally, including holding the world number one position during the COVID-impacted 2020 and 2021 seasons.

- In 2023, Clarke was ranked first on the European Tour, winning four of nine events and competing on all continents.
- In 2024, he finished second globally, with two wins and multiple podium finishes on the European Tour.
- Through part of 2025, Clarke has won six of nine events played, currently ranked third worldwide, and has maintained podium finishes in every tournament.

=== International ===
- Mexico Open (2024): 1st place
- French Open (2023): 1st place
- Italian Open (2023): 1st place
- Dutch Open (2023): 1st place
- Slovenian Open (2023): 1st place
- Sharjah International (2023): 1st place
- Vietnam Open (2025): 1st place

=== Major achievements ===
- World Ranking: Top 3 globally from 2020 to 2025; ranked No. 1 during the COVID-affected 2020–21 seasons.
- FootGolf World Tour Titles: Champion in three consecutive years, including 2019.
- European Tour: Ranked No. 1 in 2023, and consistently in the top 3 from 2020 to 2025.
- International Play: Competed on all continents.
