= Clock golf =

Game based on golf

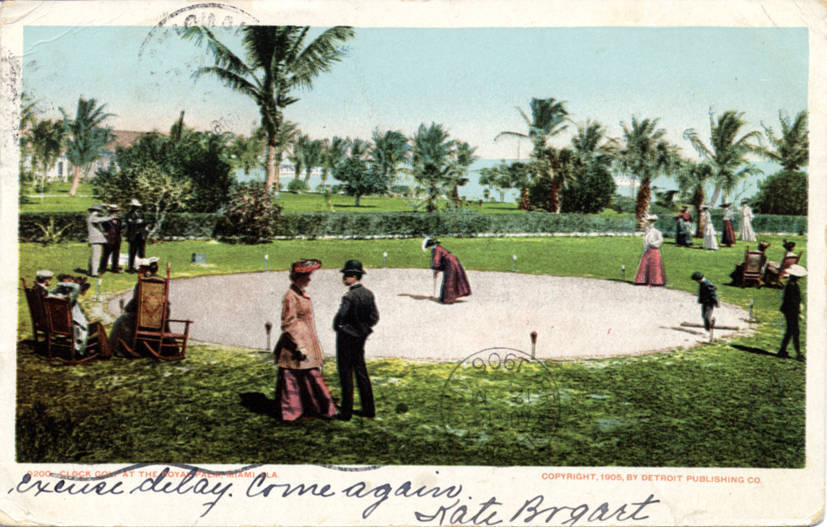
Clock golf in Miami, Florida, 1905

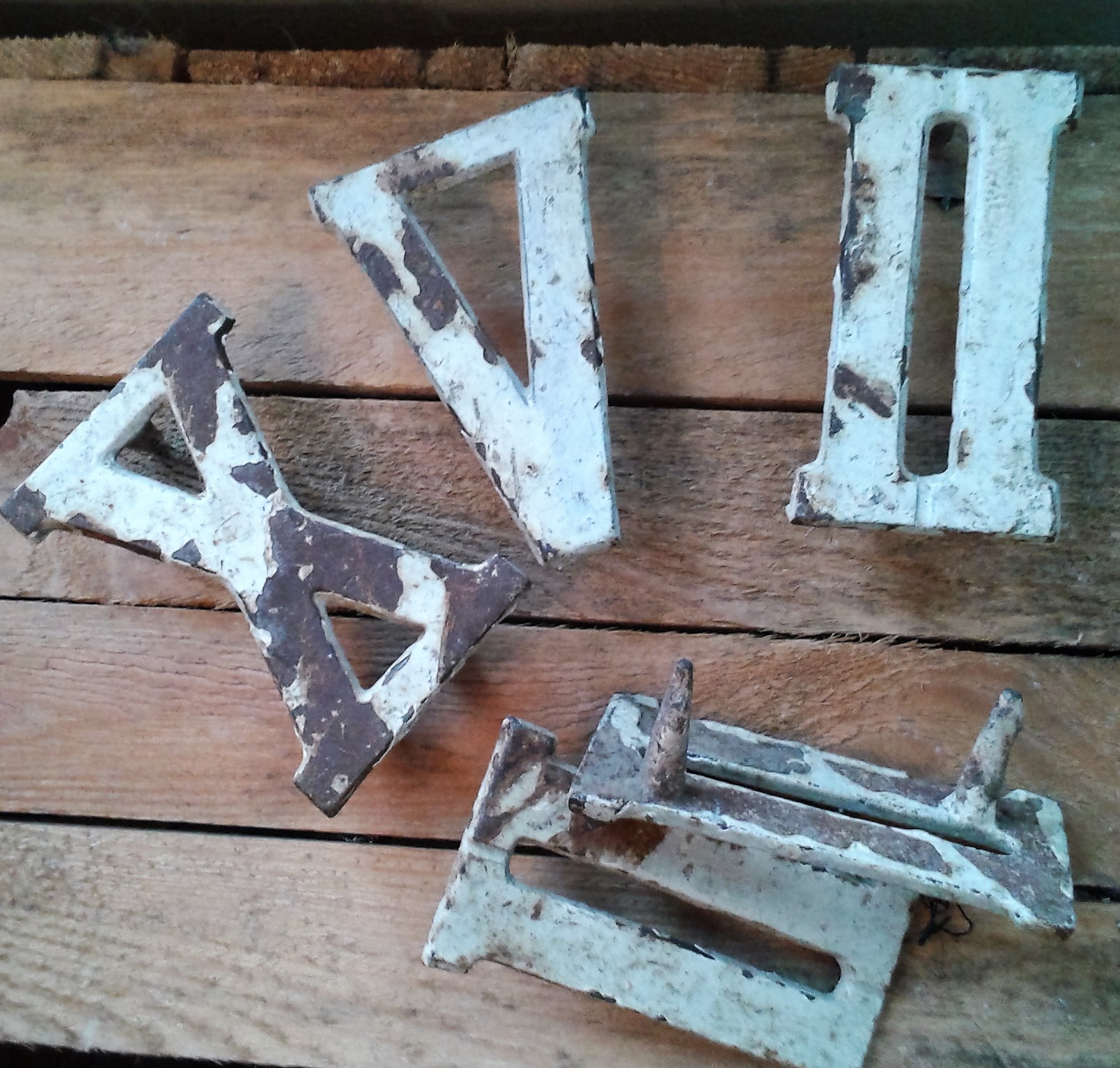
Old clock golf numbers, showing spikes for insertion into the lawn

Clock golf is a game based on golf, originating in the mid-19th century. Players putt a golf ball from each in turn of 12 numbered points arranged in a circle as in a clock face, to a single hole placed within the circle. Alternative names include clock-golf, round the clock golf, and golf around the clock.

Jaques of London's description suggests that clock golf can be played wherever there is space for "an approximate circle of 10–30ft in diameter", and that shrubs and other obstacles can add to the interest. The hole is not placed centrally, so the 12 "holes" of the game can be of different lengths. A writer in Landscape Architecture Magazine, 1926, suggests it needs a 20–24 ft circle, and lists it among "the lawn sports now commonly played."

SHAPE America offered a set of instructions for "Golf Around the Clock" as a "lead-up game" that was useful as a preliminary for golf learners.

== History of clock golf ==
The firm Jaques of London claims they "originated the popular garden game of Clock Golf in the mid 19th century". The Oxford English Dictionary's earliest illustration of the use of the term dates from 1905. The wording on an early boxed set of equipment was "Clock Golf – A new game for the lawn – Interesting to golfers and a most popular amusement at garden parties." Metal roman numbers for clock golf have been made by F. H. Ayres of London and Hamleys. The firm of A.G. Spalding of New York manufactured a set using numbers 1–12 around 1900, and in the late 1920s, the firm of P.S.P. Inc. sold a stylish set of 1–12, painted alternately red and white, presented in a tin under the name "Round the Clock Golf".

The game has often been offered to hotel guests as entertainment. A 1905 print of "Clock golf at the Royal Palm [Hotel], Miami, Fla" is held by the Library of Congress, and in 1909, The New York Times reported that 30 guests, both ladies and gentlemen, had taken part in a clock golf tournament at the Pocono Mountain House hotel at Mount Pocono. A 1925 advertisement for a hotel in Bournemouth, England offers "Croquet, Clock Golf, Billiards, etc." while in 2016, a hotel in Scarborough, England says that "the children's play area, clock golf and putting green, provide plenty of fun activities for children of all ages" and at one in Silkeborg, Denmark, "You can also avail yourself of clock golf or the pétanque court."

Clock golf was played during a tea party at Donington Hall in October 1938, according to Richard Williams' biography of race driver Richard Seaman, A Race With Love and Death.

English novelist E. F. Benson refers to clock golf in Chapter 8 of his novel Lucia in London (1927) in the Mapp and Lucia series. Daisy and Robert Quantock are playing the game on their lawn.

British novelist P. G. Wodehouse refers to country house lodgers playing clock golf in Summer Moonshine (1937). Clock golf is played by the guests of Lord Emsworth in Wodehouses's novel, Something Fresh.

Agatha Christie's novel 4:50 from Paddington (1957) features a (rusty) clock golf; the game is played in her novel The Seven Dials Mystery; and it was part of the festivities in her novel Dead Man's Folly (1956). Christie herself played clock golf at her Greenway home in Devon.

Clock golf was available to passengers on the promenade deck of the Short S.23 flying boat.

The first course in Denmark is said to have been at Gråsten Palace, where Queen Ingrid enjoyed playing with her family.

== Clock golf today ==
Jaques of London still sold equipment for the game, comprising a set of 12 markers numbered I to XII (with spikes on the back for insertion into the lawn), balls, and a pre-formed hole with a flag, in 2021, although as of 2025 it is not listed on their website. In 2019, a Danish firm offered to install a prefabricated clock golf playing area with artificial grass surrounded by a granite border. As of 2025, one supplier of golf equipment offered a "Clock Golf Set (3/4)" which comprised a hole cup and putting pin with nine putting arrows. The same supplier offered a "Home Golf Set" with one hole and pin and twelve arrows, but did not use the name "clock golf" in its description.

On 12 July 2025, 19 contestants in the North Pole Marathon participated in the inaugural North Pole Clock Golf Championship, playing on snow.
