= Association of Summer Olympic International Federations =

Nonprofit sports organisation

ASOIF
- Association of Summer Olympic International Federations
- Abbreviation: ASOIF
- Formation: 30 May 1983; 43 years ago
- Type: Nonprofit organisation
- Purpose: Inter-sport federation organisation
- Headquarters: Lausanne, Switzerland
- President: Ingmar De Vos
- Vice President: Nenad Lalović
- Executive Director: James Carr
- Parent organisation: International Olympic Committee
- Website: www.asoif.com

The Association of Summer Olympic International Federations (ASOIF; French: Association des fédérations internationales olympiques des sports d'été) is a nonprofit organisation of international sports federations that compete in the Summer Olympic Games. It is headquartered in Lausanne, Switzerland, the same city where the International Olympic Committee (IOC) is also headquartered.

== History ==
On 30 May 1983, the 21 International Federations governing the sports included at the time in the programme of the 1984 Summer Olympic Games decided to form the Association of Summer Olympic International Federations (ASOIF).

ASOIF was formed, as stated in the first article of its constitution, 'to co-ordinate and to defend the common interests of its members' and to 'ensure close co-operation between its members and members of the Olympic Movement and other organisations'. These needs were identified in order to preserve the unity of the Olympic movement while maintaining 'the authority, independence, and autonomy of the member International Federations.'

The members of ASOIF meet once a year in a General Assembly. The General Assembly usually precedes the joint meeting between the executive board of the International Olympic Committee and the International Federations where a multitude of topics are discussed in the common interests of the Olympic Movement. ASOIF is administered by an executive body, the council, which consists of seven individual members, most of whom are presidents of Summer Olympic International Federations. The ASOIF General Secretariat is located in Lausanne and is administered by the ASOIF Executive Director.

In 2015, the Organising Committee for the Olympic Games Tokyo 2020 had proposed five new sports in response to the new flexibility provided by Olympic Agenda 2020, the IOC's strategic roadmap for the future of the Olympic Movement. Olympic Agenda 2020 gives host cities the option of suggesting new sports and events for inclusion in their edition of the Games. Karate, skateboarding, sports climbing, surfing, and baseball/softball were added to the Olympic Programme in Tokyo 2020. ASOIF has amended its statutes to enable IFs "governing sports included within the events programme for a specific edition of the Summer Olympic Games" to become "Associate Members".

On 22 June 2023, the IOC decided to withdraw recognition of the International Boxing Association (IBA), in accordance with Rule 3.7 of the Olympic Charter (OC), although boxing will continue to be an Olympic sport for the 2028 Summer Olympics. This was the first-ever international federation to be removed from the Olympic Movement by the IOC. According to the Statutes of ASOIF, as updated in June 2023, the ASOIF Council may provisionally suspend any Full Member's rights (set forth in Article 3.4) if its IOC recognition is suspended, but allow it to retain its Member's rights set forth in Article 3.5. The Council may lift the suspension when such full member's IOC recognition is reinstated (Article 3.13). In April 2024 the ASOIF General Assembly excluded the International Boxing Association (IBA) as an ASOIF Member, in line with the ASOIF Statutes. This move follows the CAS decision of 2 April 2024, dismissing IBA's appeal against the IOC decision to withdraw IBA's recognition as the international federation (IF) for Olympic boxing. Previously, ASOIF had already suspended IBA's Full Member's rights.

== ASOIF Council ==
The council is composed of a president and six members, all from different federations. One of the six members is elected as vice-president. The president and all the members are elected for 4-year mandates. The executive director is nominated by the council on the proposal of the president as an executive position. The executive director is also on the council, but without voting rights.

Members of the ASOIF Council as of March 2025 are:

Designation	Name	Country	Sport Federation
President	Ingmar De Vos	Belgium	International Equestrian Federation
Vice President	Nenad Lalović	Serbia	United World Wrestling
Council Members	Ximena Restrepo	Colombia	World Athletics
Council Members	Jean-Christophe Rolland	France	World Rowing
Council Members	Petra Sörling	Sweden	International Table Tennis Federation
Council Members	Morinari Watanabe	Japan	World Gymnastics
Council Members	Andreas Zagklis	Greece	International Basketball Federation
Executive Director	James Carr	United Kingdom	

== Members ==
International federations may apply to become a full member if they govern a core Summer Olympic sport or govern a sport which featured in the three most recent Summer Olympics. They may apply to become an associate member if they govern a sport included on the programme for future editions of the Summer Olympic Games or govern a sport which has featured in any five editions of the Summer Olympic Games since 1988.

As of June 2025, the Association of Summer Olympic International Federations (ASOIF) has 30 full member and six associate member international federations.

=== Full members ===
Sport	International federation	Acronym	Confederations	National associations	Year founded	President	Official website	Notes
Aquatics	World Aquatics	WAQU	5	209	1908	(Kuwait) Husain Al-Musallam	worldaquatics.com	
Archery	World Archery	WA	6	163	1931	(United States) Greg Easton	worldarchery.sport	(Note: Also a member of International World Games Association (IWGA).)
Athletics	World Athletics	WATH	5	214	1912	(United Kingdom) Sebastian Coe	worldathletics.org	
Badminton	Badminton World Federation	BWF	5	188	1934	(Thailand) Khunying Patama Leeswadtrakul	bwfbadminton.com	(Note: Also a member of The Association for International Sport for All (TAFISA).)
Basketball and 3x3	International Basketball Federation	FIBA	5	212	1932	(Qatar) Saud Ali Al Thani	fiba.basketball	
Canoeing	Paddle Worldwide	ICF	5	181	1924	(Germany) Thomas Konietzko	paddleworldwide.com	
Cycling	International Cycling Union	UCI	5	205	1900	(France) David Lappartient	uci.org	
Equestrian	International Federation for Equestrian Sports	FEI		134	1921	(Belgium) Ingmar De Vos	fei.org	
Fencing	International Fencing Federation	FIE	5	152	1913	(Egypt) Abdel Monem El-Husseiny (interim)	fie.org	
Field hockey	International Hockey Federation	FIH	5	128	1924	(Macau) Tayyab Ikram	fih.hockey	
Football, futsal and beach soccer	International Association Football Federation	FIFA	6	211	1904	(Switzerland) Gianni Infantino	fifa.com	
Golf	International Golf Federation	IGF		147	1958	(Sweden) Annika Sörenstam	igfgolf.org	
Gymnastics	World Gymnastics	WG	5	148	1881	(Japan) Morinari Watanabe	gymnastics.sport	
Handball	International Handball Federation	IHF	6	209	1946	(Egypt) Hassan Moustafa	ihf.info	
Judo	International Judo Federation	IJF		207	1951	(Romania) Marius Vizer	ijf.org	
Modern pentathlon	International Modern Pentathlon Union	UIPM	6	110	1948	(United States) Rob Stull	uipmworld.org	
Roller sports	World Skate	WSK	5	141	1924	(Italy) Sabatino Aracu	worldskate.org	
Rowing	World Rowing	FISA	5	159	1892	(France) Jean-Christophe Rolland	worldrowing.com	
Rugby union	World Rugby	WR	6	117	1886	(Australia) Brett Robinson	world.rugby	
Sailing	World Sailing	WS		140	1907	(China) Li Quanhai	sailing.org	
Shooting	International Shooting Sport Federation	ISSF		161	1907	(Italy) Luciano Rossi	issf-sports.org	
Climbing	World Climbing	WC		95	2007	(Italy) Marco Maria Scolaris	worldclimbing.com	
Surfing	International Surfing Association	ISA		113	1964	(Argentina) Fernando Aguerre	isasurf.org	
Table tennis	International Table Tennis Federation	ITTF		226	1926	(Sweden) Petra Sörling	ittf.com	
Taekwondo	World Taekwondo	WT		212	1973	(South Korea) Choue Chung-won	worldtaekwondo.org	
Tennis	World Tennis	ITF		207	1913	(United States) David Haggerty	itftennis.com	
Triathlon	World Triathlon	TRI	5	172	1989	(Spain) Antonio Fernández Arimany	triathlon.org	
Volleyball and beach volleyball	International Volleyball Federation	FIVB	5	222	1947	(Brazil) Fabio Azevedo	fivb.com	
Weightlifting	International Weightlifting Federation	IWF	5	192	1905	(Iraq) Mohamed Jalood	iwf.sport	
Wrestling, International grappling and Amateur MMA	United World Wrestling	UWW	5	180	1912	(Serbia) Nenad Lalović	uww.org	

=== Associate members ===
Sport	International federation	Acronym	Confederations	National associations	Year founded	President	Official website	Notes
American football	International Federation of American Football	IFAF	5	75	1998	(France) Pierre Trochet	americanfootball.sport	(Note: Also a member of Association of IOC Recognised International Sports Federations (ARISF).)
Baseball, Baseball5 & Softball	World Baseball Softball Confederation	WBSC	5	143	2013	(Italy) Riccardo Fraccari	wbsc.org	
Boxing	World Boxing	WB	5	106	2023	(Kazakhstan) Gennady Golovkin	worldboxing.org	
Cricket	International Cricket Council	ICC	5	105	1909	(India) Jay Shah	icc-cricket.com	
Lacrosse	World Lacrosse	WL	4	92	2008	(United States) Bob DeMarco	worldlacrosse.sport	
Squash	World Squash	WSF	5	115	1967	(United Kingdom) Zena Wooldridge	worldsquash.sport	

== See also ==
- Winter Olympic Federations
- International Olympic Committee
- Association of IOC Recognised International Sports Federations
- SportAccord
- International World Games Association
- List of international sports federations
