= Ivo Ferriani =

Italian sports official and bobsledder

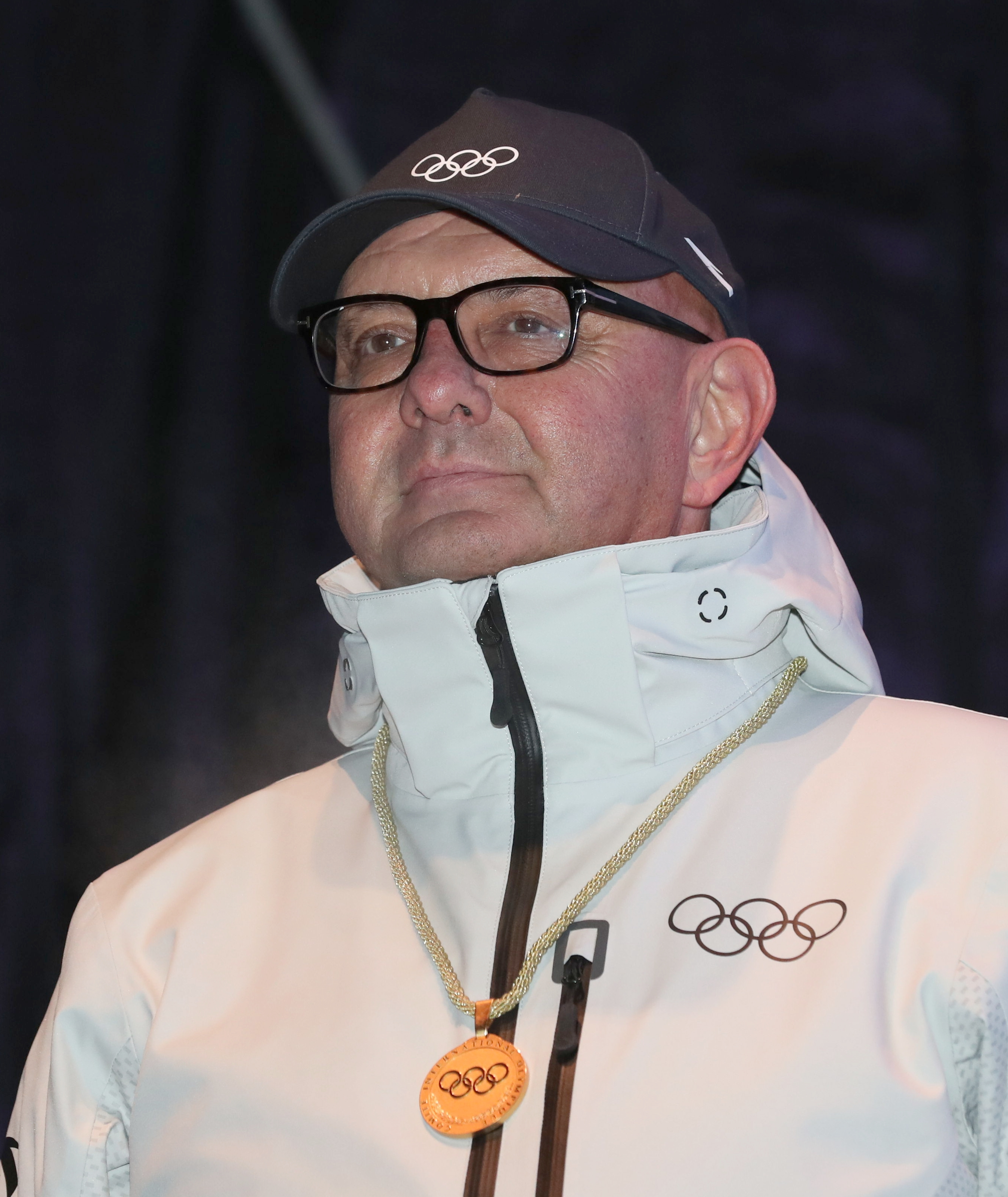
Ferriani in 2020

Ivo Ferriani (born 5 March 1960) is an Italian sports official and bobsledder. In September 2010, he was elected president of the International Bobsleigh and Skeleton Federation (IBSF), ending the 16-year presidency of Canada's Robert H. Storey. In 2016, Ferriani became a member of the International Olympic Committee (IOC) until his IBSF presidency came to an end in 2026.

== Athletic career ==
Ferriani was on the bobsleigh team from 1984 to 1990. He competed for Italy at the 1988 Winter Olympics in Calgary, finishing 19th in the two-man event. In lesser events, he won a silver medal at the 1986 Junior European Championships in Igls and was Italian Junior European champion in 1986 and 1987.

== Coaching career ==
From 1990 to 1994, he served as coach for the Italian bobsleigh team. Then he served as coach of the French national team from 1994 to 1999. While coach for the French team, they won three FIBT World Championships medals (Gold: 1999 four-man, Bronze: 1995 two-man, 1999 two-man) and a bronze medal in the four-man bobsleigh event at the 1998 Winter Olympics (tied with Great Britain). During the 1998 Games, Ferriani made a bet with French driver Bruno Mingeon that if Mingeon won a medal, Ferriani would run through the snow in his underwear. Mingeon won the bronze and Ferriani kept his promise.

Following the 1999 world championships, Ferriani became coach of Bobsleigh Canada Skeleton, serving in that position until 2002. While in Canada, the team had their best finish of fifth in the two-man event at the 2002 Winter Olympics in Salt Lake City.

== Sports official career ==
After the 2002 Games, Ferriani returned to Italy where he served as technical director for bobsleigh in the Italian Winter Sports Federation (FISI) from 2002 to 2009. During the 2006 Winter Olympics in Turin, he served as TOROC competition manager for the bobsleigh, luge, and skeleton events.

In 2009, he announced his candidacy for IBSF President, a position to which he was elected during their annual meeting in Lake Placid, New York, United States until 2026.
