= Footgolf =

Sport

- Highest governing body: Federation for International FootGolf (FIFG)

Characteristics
- Contact: No
- Team members: Teams or single competitors
- Mixed-sex: Yes
- Type: Outdoor
- Equipment: Football (indoor or turf football shoes)
- Venue: Golf course

Presence
- Country or region: Worldwide
- Olympic: No
- Paralympic: No

Footgolf is a hybrid sport in which players kick a football (soccer ball) into a cup in as few shots as possible. The name is a portmanteau of football and golf.

'FootGolf' is the name established by the Federation for International FootGolf (FIFG) which governs, sets global standards, establishes rules and guidelines, and coordinates the sport’s development among its member associations.

== Rules ==
The game is played similarly to golf, with the exception that players use a football instead of a golf ball, and the ball is kicked rather than struck with a club, working toward a 50 cm-52 cm diameter by 28 cm deep "footgolf cup" usually located away from golf greens. The player who finishes the course with the fewest shots wins. Footgolf is often played on golf courses, though it may also be played on specially built courses. The first shot has to be played from a tee box, and bunkers, trees, water and hills must be crossed or avoided in order to reach the hole.

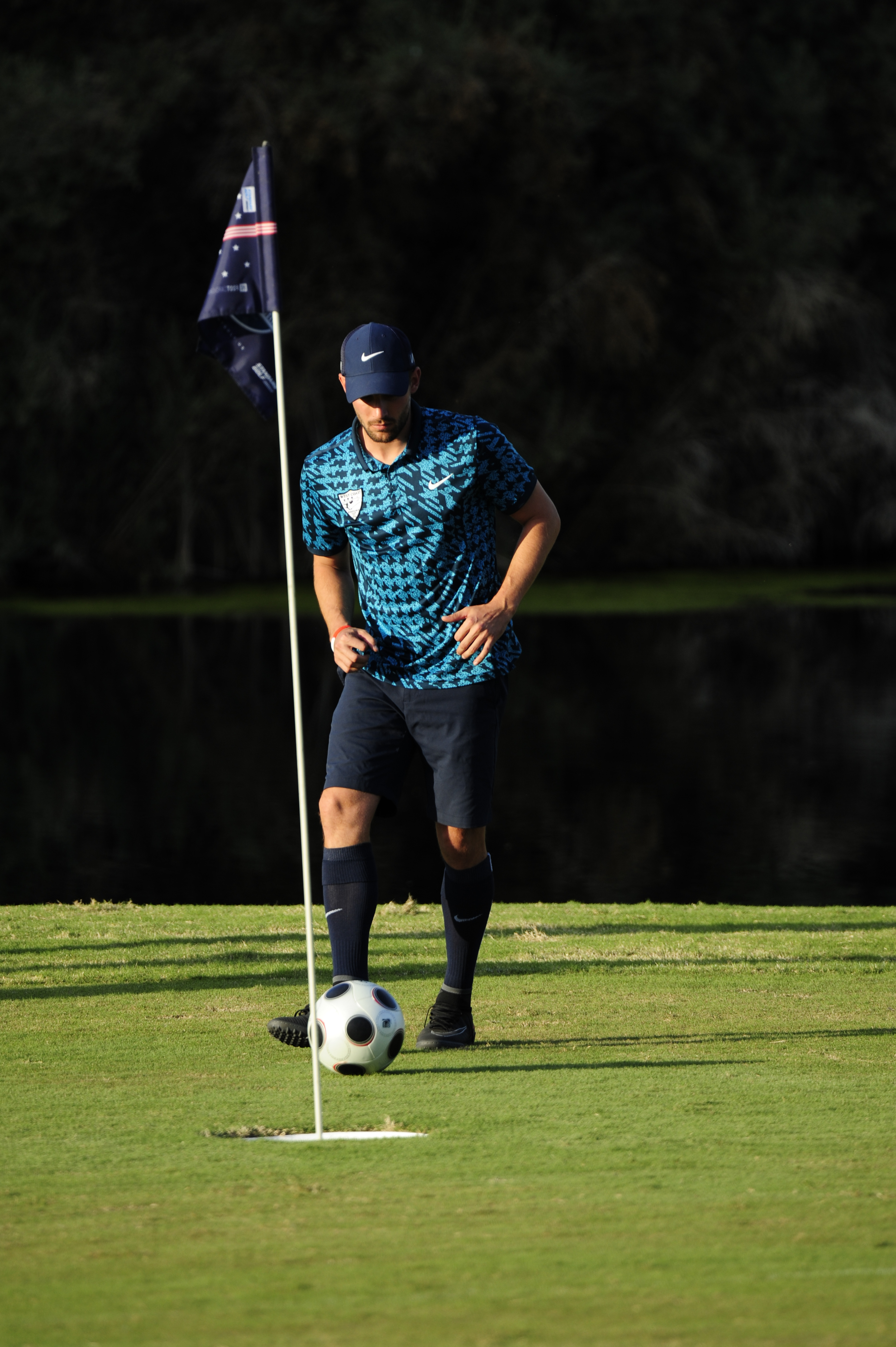
Footgolf player making a putt

The game is played with a regulation No. 5 football. Since footballs cannot be propelled as far as golf balls in one shot, footgolf is played on holes shorter than those used in golf. Pars are typically five shots or fewer. Compared to golf, footgolf is quicker to play, faster to learn, and cheaper in terms of equipment.

The Federation for International FootGolf (FIFG) has published a footgolf rulebook since 2012.

== Origins ==
A game with roughly similar rules, codeball, attained brief popularity in the United States during the late 1920s and 1930s.

Kick golf, with very similar rules was invented by Tim Nye of Sheffield who pitched the idea at UK's Dragons' Den in 2006. The dragons ultimately decided against taking him up on his £200,000 proposal and development of the game was shelved.

The sport of footgolf as we know it today (including attire, etiquette and general rules) was created in the Netherlands in 2008 by Bas Korsten and Michael Jansen, who loosely based it on a post-training game played by Korsten's brother—pro-footballer Willem Korsten—during his time at British football club Tottenham Hotspur from 1999 to 2001. Players would end training sessions by kicking the footballs from the training pitch back to the changing rooms in as few kicks as possible. To officially launch this new sport, in which playing on a regulation golf course is fundamental, Korsten, Jansen and a team of colleagues set up a national and international bond and organised the first tournament (Nederlandse Kampioenschap FootGolf) at Golfbaan Het Rijk van Nijmegen on 6 September 2009. This tournament, later televised on RTL7, was played by Dutch professional and ex-professional footballers and won by Theo Janssen.

In parallel, the sport also began developing in other regions. In September 2009, Francisco Name registered the trademark "Fut-Golf" with the Mexican Institute of Industrial Property (IMPI), representing one of the earliest documented references to the sport in Latin America. The trademark later became associated with the development and organization of footgolf activities in Mexico.

== Organized play ==
The first-ever footgolf tournament was organized in the Netherlands by Michael Jansen and Bas Korsten, and played by a mix of Dutch and Belgian professional footballers. After this, many countries began organizing matches, events, tournaments, national leagues and national associations around this game.

Later, Belgium and Hungary switched from playing in parks to golf courses, and the game was introduced to Argentina in 2010. American FootGolf League, the major league of footgolf in the United States, was founded in 2011. The game was internationally publicized, and countries worldwide started collaborating on the development of the game. By 2014, the game was offered at hundreds of courses in the United States and was in the final stages of being recognized by Sport England.

The game's emergence coincided with the decline of the popularity of golf among young people, with 643 courses closing between 2006 and 2014 in the United States. The sport has saved many struggling golf courses, and the Professional Golfers' Association of America and World Golf Foundation have both acknowledged footgolf's contribution to helping golf courses generate more income, and noted that it may contribute to the growth of golf itself. Former PGA president Ted Bishop said in 2014 that "I think it would be ludicrous to think there won't be a percentage of those people that might say, 'Hey, you know what? I think I'd like to try and play golf.'" In March 2016, the LPGA golfer Paula Creamer said "Anytime you can do something differently in the game of golf, it's fun and I think we'll probably be out there (playing FootGolf) a little bit more now." By 2020, the State Games of America and the USA Masters Games have included the sport of footgolf in their official competitions.

A group of countries combined to form the Federation for International FootGolf (FIFG) in June 2012, and eight countries played the first FootGolf World Cup in Hungary that month (won by Hungarian, Bela Lengyel). In January 2016, the second FootGolf World Cup was held in Argentina and 230 players from 26 FIFG member countries participated. The winner of the individual event was Argentinian player, Christian Otero and the team champion was Team USA. The third FootGolf World Cup was held in December 2018, in Marrakech, Morocco. The men's individual champion was Matias Perrone from Argentina and the women's individual champion was Sophie Brown from the United Kingdom. France won the gold in team competition, Team UK finished second and the previous world champion Team USA finished in third.

In the spring of 2015, the National Golf Courses Owners Association (NGCOA) recognized the American FootGolf League (AFGL) as the governing body for the sport of footgolf in the U.S., and a few months later, Roberto Balestrini, founder of footgolf in North America was selected by Golf Inc Magazine as one of "The Ten Most Innovative People in Golf". On 2 October 2017, the GAISF (Global Association of International Sports Federations) granted observer status to the Federation for International FootGolf (FIFG).

In December 2015, the Swedish Golf Federation, a member of the highest sporting authority in Sweden (the Swedish Sports Confederation), by a formal two-part voting, accepted and approved footgolf as an official sport (eligible for recognition in national championships, future inclusion in the Olympic Games, etc.).

The fourth FIFG FootGolf World Cup took place in Orlando, Florida in 2023 and displayed its global reach with trophies won by six countries in individual and team competitions. It was held at Walt Disney World Golf Resort and the Evermore Orlando Resort from 27 May through 6 June. Nearly 1,000 professional footgolf players from 39 countries gathered for the event, including former professional athletes like Alan Smith, Olindo Mare, and Roberto Ayala. It was broadcast on ESPN.

In 2023, The Professional Footgolf Tour staged the first international footgolf event in the Middle East when the Sharjah International FootGolf event took place in January of that year. The event, hosted by the Sharjah Commerce and Tourism Development Authority, offered a $40,000 prize fund to be shared between the winning players. This event was part of the Sharjah's 'Week of the Stars' event, where football legends such as Francesco Totti, Clarence Seedorf and Alessandro Costacurta have also played the game.

Mexico emerged as one of the leading footgolf nations in Latin America during the 2010s and 2020s, developing a national competitive structure and hosting annual championships through the Mexican FootGolf Federation. Footgolf competitions are held in numerous Mexican cities, including Acapulco, Cancún, Guadalajara, León, Monterrey, Puebla, Veracruz and Mexico City.

In 2026, Acapulco hosted the 5th FIFG FootGolf World Cup. The event brought together more than 1,200 players from over 60 countries and 64 national teams, marking a significant milestone in the sport's global expansion and represented the largest FootGolf championship staged in Latin America and the world.

== Attire ==
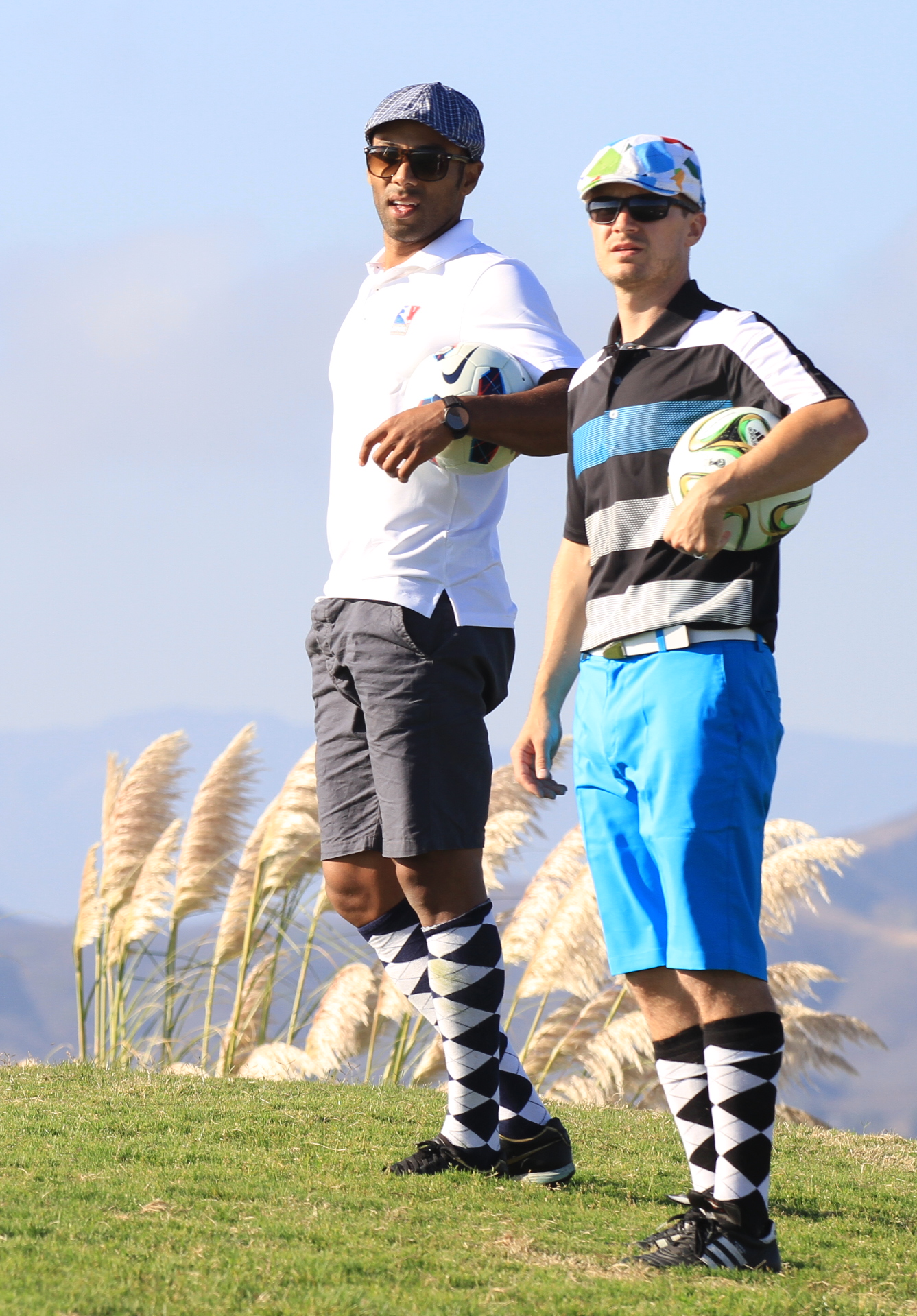
American FootGolf League players at the U.S. Pro-Am Tour in 2014

The dress code for competition states a "classic golf style uniform with wearing indoor or turf football shoes" for tournament play, and notes that most golf courses have a dress code for golfers, which footgolf players would also have to follow.

== Notable players ==
- Ben Clarke
- Steffi Sarge Kaur
- Ján Kozák
- Matías Perrone
- Olindo Mare
- Alan Smith
- Roberto Ayala

== Buschball ==
Buschball is a variation invented in Germany.

=== Rules ===
The aim of the game is to hit the pole with as few shots as possible. The pole is a flag pole. Both the pole as well as the flag are part of the target.

First the order of the players is drawn. The first player sets the pole for the first round, the second player begins the round by trying to hit the pole with as few kicks as possible. Once everyone has had a turn the second player places the pole and the third player starts the round etc.

Every player has a maximum of nine attempts to hit the pole. If after these nine attempts he fails to hit the pole ten points are recorded for that particular player and it is the following player's turn. At the end of the round the player with the fewest kicks is awarded a best round.

The first set is completed once everyone has had a turn to place the pole. The players can decide how many sets they wish to play. The winner is the person who at the end of the last set has the fewest kicks. In the case of a draw the number of best rounds decides.
Note: While playing, no-one is allowed to touch the ball while it is still moving. Before a shot, any loose object behind the ball (sticks, stones, etc.) can be removed to ensure safety. Any object in front of the ball may not be removed.

=== History ===
The oldest known version of buschball was played in 1977. Due to a lack of players for a standard game of football Andreas Oligmüller and his friends decided to shoot at trees and road signs. After a while that became too easy so they decided to aim at trees hidden behind bushes. The first variant of the game was born.

=== Players and clubs ===
The number of players and clubs is constantly growing. In 2008, 35 people played buschball and in 2009 the sport had managed to attract 150 players.

== See also ==
- Codeball
