= Miss Lucy =

Miss Lucy or Ms. Lucy may refer to:

- "Miss Lucy had a baby", a schoolyard rhyme, jump-rope chant, and clapping game
- "Miss Lucy had a steamboat", a schoolyard profanity-avoidance rhyme, jump-rope chant, and clapping game
- "Miss Lucy Long", a 19th-century minstrel-show tune
- Chrysoblephus gibbiceps, a species of sea bream in South Africa
