= Clapping game =

Cooperative game of clapping hands

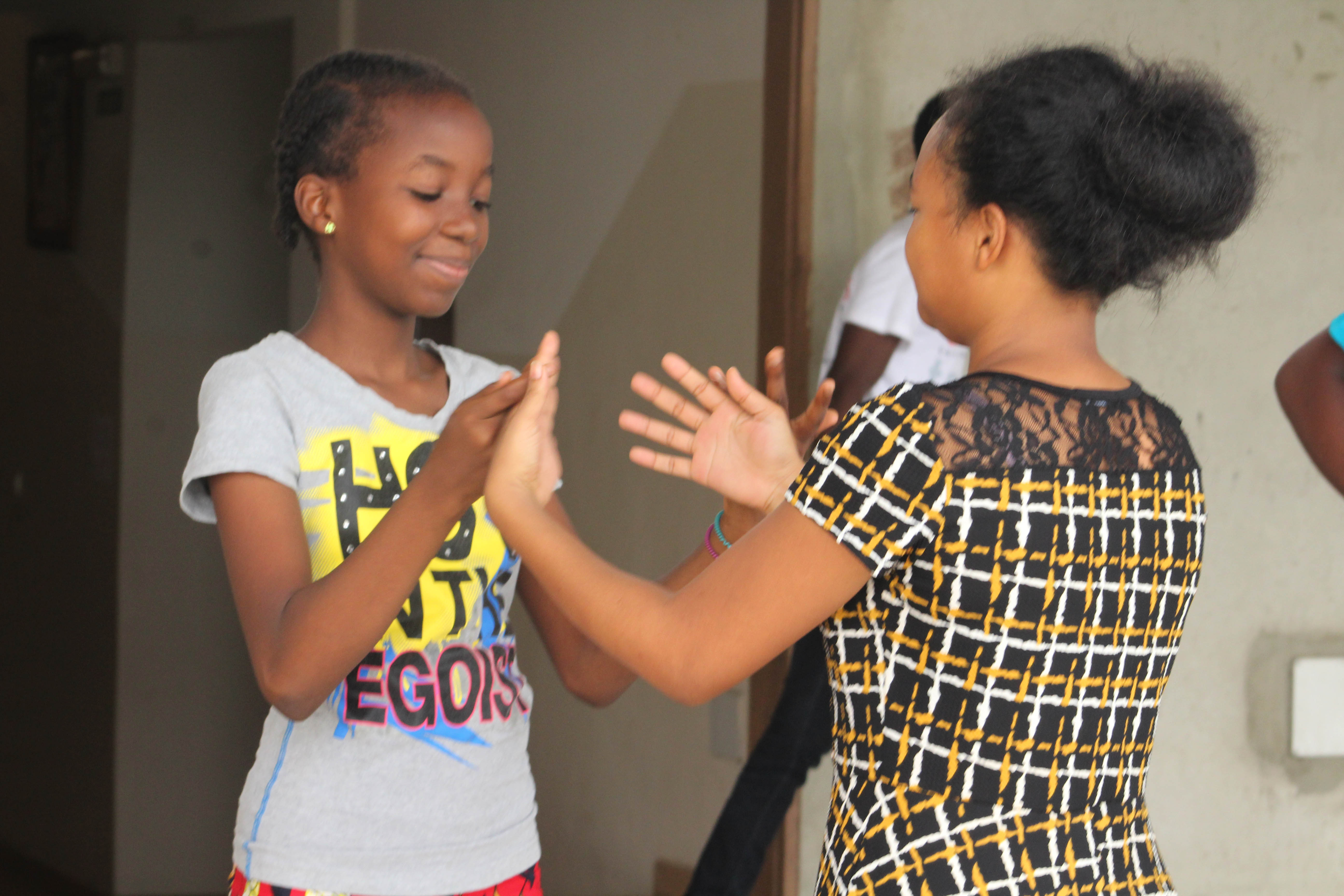
Children in Benin playing a clapping game

A clapping game (subset of hand games) is a type of usually cooperative (i.e., non-competitive) game which is generally played by two players and involves clapping as a rhythmic accompaniment to a singing game or reciting of a rhyme, often nursery rhymes. Clapping games are found throughout the world and similar games may be known throughout large areas with regional variation.

== Nature of the games ==
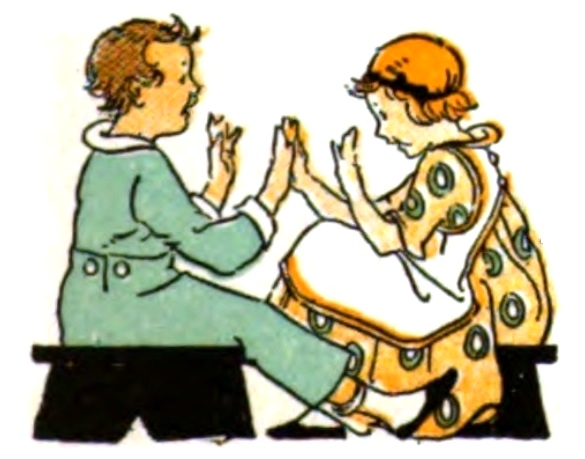
Illustration of a clapping game created by Andrew and Kyle Clements, c.1920

Due to the communication skills and coordination required, simple clapping games are age appropriate for children age 24 months and above. In many cultures clapping games are played by all sexes and ages, but in many European and European-influenced cultures, they are largely the preserve of girls.

Claps commonly included in patterns are clapping one's own hands, clapping both hands of a partner, and clapping one hand of a partner, generally across such as the right hand of each player. The clapping may include other activities such as thigh slapping, or a final move such as touching the ground and freezing. Sara Bernstein describes seventy-nine "basic hand-claps".

Clapping patterns may be used with only specific rhymes, generically with most rhymes, or improvised. Children in different areas may be more or less strict about which claps accompany which rhymes but generally different clapping patterns may be used to accompany different rhymes. The rhymes are generally very similar to a jump-rope rhymes. Some games are played without a rhyme, such as 'Slide', and not all require the players to clap each other's hands, such as 'Sevens.'

Clapping games are a part of oral tradition. As such there are a variety of distinct clapping games or families of games. A game may be performed or played in various versions found in different areas and times and often according to ethnicity. For example, "Hello, Operator" may be called "Miss Susie" or "Miss Lucy" and may contain, omit, or vary verses or specific lines. Clapping patterns and actions may also vary. There is no canonical version of any game though children often fight over whose version is "right" or "real".

== Clapping games in popular culture and global variations ==
Clapping games have been a significant part of childhood play for generations, and their popularity extends across many different cultures. While they are often associated with young children, the specific forms and styles of clapping games can vary widely depending on region and local tradition. In addition to the widely known nursery rhymes, clapping games may incorporate original rhymes, chants, or even local idioms that reflect the community’s cultural identity.

In many parts of the world, clapping games serve as a communal activity, reinforcing social bonds and group dynamics. In African American culture, for example, clapping games are often used to teach rhythm and coordination, with some games even incorporating elements of call-and-response. In the Caribbean, clapping games may be performed during celebrations or festivals, sometimes evolving into larger performances that blend dance, music, and storytelling. The use of clapping as a rhythmic accompaniment allows the games to transcend language barriers, providing a universal form of play that unites children through a shared, rhythmic experience.

The persistence and evolution of clapping games reflect the resilience of oral traditions and their ability to adapt to changing times. Despite regional variations, the core aspects of these games—cooperation, rhythm, and verbal expression—remain consistent across cultures. This adaptability ensures the ongoing popularity of clapping games, as children continue to create new versions and interpretations of old classics.

== Examples ==
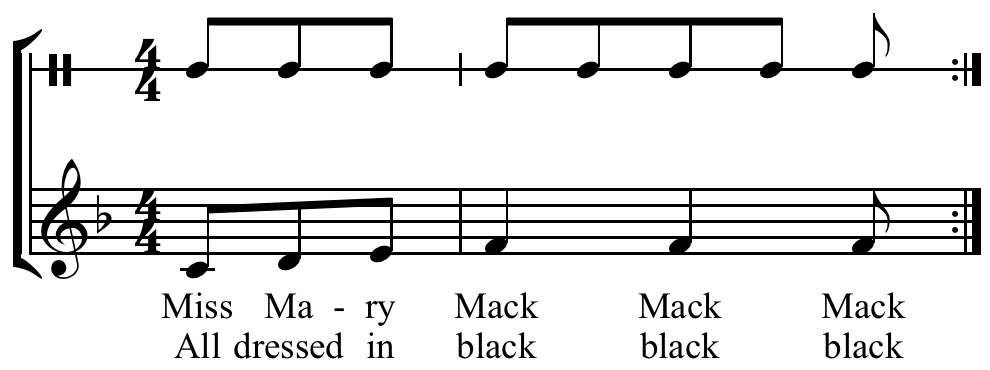
"Miss Mary Mack"

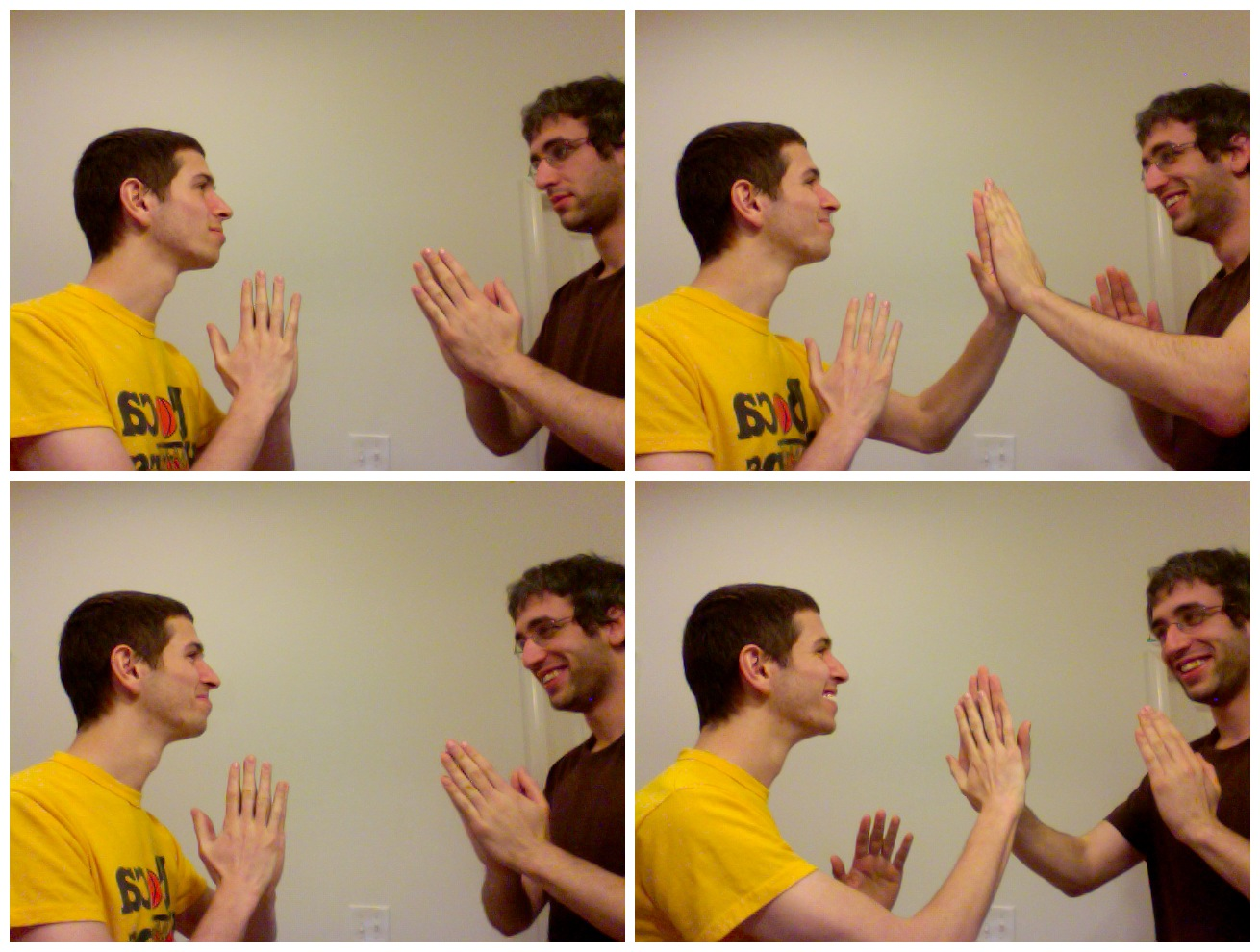
A common style of playing "Pat-a-Cake".

Clapping games include:

- "Apple on a Stick"
- "Bobo Ski Waten Taten"
- "El conejo de la suerte"
- "Crocidilly"
- "Cup game"
- "Down by the Banks"
- "Down Down Baby" (also known as "Roller Coaster")
- "Four White Horses"
- "Mary Mack"
- "Miss Lucy Had a Baby"
- "Miss Susie"
- "My Boyfriend Gave Me an Apple"
- "Nanay, Tatay"
  - "Pak ganern"
- "Pat-a-cake, pat-a-cake, baker's man"
- "Pease Porridge Hot"
- "Pretty Little Dutch Girl"
- "Rockin' Robin"
- "A Sailor Went to Sea"
- "Say Say Oh Playmate"/"Say Say My Playmate"
- "Shame Shame Shame"
- "Stella Ella Ola"
- "Concentration (64)"
- "Sevens"
- "Avocado"

== See also ==
- Palmas (music)
