= Wee Sing =

American songbook series

Wee Sing is a songbook series created by Pamela Conn Beall and Susan Hagen Nipp and published by Price Stern Sloan. It would also inspire a series of children's CDs, cassettes, coloring books, toys, videos, and apps. The videos were shot in Portland, Oregon.

== Home Videos ==
=== Wee Sing Together (1985) ===
Sally gets a surprise when her two favorite stuffed animals, Melody Mouse with lavender pink-colored body (dressed up as a purple and white ballerina) and Hum Bear with tan-colored body magically come to life and take her, along with her brother Jonathan and their dog Bingo to the magical Wee Sing Park for Sally's birthday party, where they meet a marching band. They sing and dance and learn how to conquer their fears when a storm hits.

==== Songs ====
1. "The More Wee Sing Together"
2. "Skidamarink"
3. "Head and Shoulders"
4. "The Finger Band"
5. "Walking Walking"
6. "Rickety Tickety"
7. "Little Peter Rabbit"
8. "I'm a Little Teapot"
9. "The Alphabet Song"
10. "B-I-N-G-O"
11. "Sally's Wearing a Red Dress"
12. "Old MacDonald Had a Farm"
13. "Looby Loo"
14. Medley: "Rain, Rain, Go Away"/"There is Thunder"
15. "Eensy Weensy Spider"
16. "If You're Happy and You Know It"
17. "Reach for the Sky"
18. "My Name and Address"
19. "Twinkle, Twinkle, Little Star"
20. "Teddy Bear"
21. "The More We Sing Together" (Reprise)

=== King Cole's Party (1987) ===
Jack, Jill, Mary, and Little Boy Blue journey toward King Cole's palace to join him and his other subjects in celebrating 100 years of peace in the kingdom, bringing various gifts: a kitten, a pair of mittens, and a fuzzy blanket, among other things. The main message is that the best gifts come from the heart, but it also teaches the importance of helping others and using good manners. This was the only Wee Sing video shot on film rather than videotape.

==== Songs ====
1. "Old King Cole"
2. "Betty Botter"
3. "Pat-a-Cake"
4. "Polly, Put the Kettle On"
5. "Sing a Song of Sixpence"
6. "Pease Porridge Hot"
7. "Jack and Jill"
8. "Mary Had a Little Lamb"
9. "Little Boy Blue"
10. "Walking Chant"
11. "Six Little Ducks"
12. "There Was a Crooked Man"
13. "Wibbleton to Wobbleton"
14. "Sea-Saw Sac-Ra-Down"
15. "This Old Man"
16. "Humpty Dumpty"
17. "Little Bo Peep"
18. "Little Jack Horner"
19. "Jack Sprat"
20. "Little Miss Muffet"
21. "Rub a Dub Dub"
22. "Jack Be Nimble"
23. "Little Tommy Tucker"
24. "Peter Piper"
25. "Old King Cole" (Reprise)

=== Grandpa's Magical Toys (1988) ===
A boy named Peter and his friends, David and Sara, visit his grandfather and discover his many toys (including Punchinello) and their secrets, all in the search of a missing music box key that he misplaced. When his grandfather leaves the room, David bumps into a music box which shrinks them, and the toys come to life. This story encourages children and adults alike that no matter how old you are on the outside or what body type you have, you can always stay young at heart.

==== Songs ====
1. "Good Morning"
2. "Punchinello"
3. "A Sailor Went to Sea"
4. "Long Legged Sailor"
5. "The Muffin Man"
6. "One Potato"
7. Medley: "Pretty Little Dutch Girl"/"I Love Coffee, I Love Tea"
8. Medley: "Mabel, Mabel"/"Miss, Miss"
9. "The Farmer in the Dell"
10. "Did You Ever See a Lassie?"
11. "The Hokey Pokey"
12. "Who Stole the Cookies from the Cookie Jar?"
13. Medley: "Roll That Red Ball"/"One, Two, Buckle My Shoe"/"One, Two, Three O'Leary"/"One, Two, Three A-Twirlsy"
14. "The Merry-Go-Round"
15. "Hambone"
16. "Playmate"

=== Wee Sing in Sillyville (1989) ===
Two children named Laurie and Scott, along with their dog Barney, magically enter their coloring book to help a woman named Sillywhim resolve the townspeople's differences. They encounter the four yellow Spurtlegurgles, the three blue Twirlypops, the two green Jingleheimers and three Fruggy Frogs, the family of red Bitty Booties and Purple Pasha and her menagerie. The primary message is that being different should never be a barrier to being friends.

==== Songs ====
1. "Do Your Ears Hang Low?"
2. "We're Here Because We're Here"
3. "Boom, Boom, Ain't It Great to Be Crazy?"
4. Medley: "Michael Finnegan"/"No, No, Yes, Yes"
5. "Once an Austrian"
6. "Grasshopper"
7. "John Jacob Jingleheimer Schmidt"
8. "Little Green Frog"
9. "Frog Round"
10. "Down by the Bay"
11. "Risseldy, Rosseldy"
12. "Bitty Booty Baby"
13. "One Bottle o'Pop"
14. "I'm a Nut"
15. "A Ram Sam Sam"
16. "Five in the Bed"
17. "Be Kind to Your Web-Footed Friends"
18. "Make New Friends"
19. "Let Us Sing Together"

=== The Best Christmas Ever! (1990) ===
Just five days before Christmas, when Poofer the Elf tries to help his best friend Gusty the Elf, he gets lost and winds up in the home of the Smiths, a loving family, and meets their caroling neighbors as well. He and the Smiths journey to the North Pole in an effort to aid Gusty, who has grown unexceptionably clumsy. After the elves, and even Santa Claus himself wrestle with the issue, Susie realizes what's wrong - Gusty needs a new pair of glasses. This story encourages children to wear glasses (if they need them), but also has subtle messages about cultural diversity, helping others, the importance of working together, the importance of wearing a seat belt and helmet while traveling, and that an adoptive family can be as close and loving as any other.

==== Songs ====
1. "We Wish You a Merry Christmas"
2. "Tapping, Tapping Little Elves"
3. "O Christmas Tree"
4. "Two Little Christmas Trees"
5. "Mother's Knives and Forks"
6. "Here We Come A-Caroling"
7. "Deck the Halls"
8. "Christmas Day"
9. "When Santa Comes to Our House"
10. "The Angel Band"
11. "Little Bells of Christmas"
12. "Star Light, Star Bright"
13. "The Christmas Wrap"
14. "Christmas is Coming"
15. Medley: "Chubby Little Snowman"/"The Chimney"
16. "Gusty the Elf"
17. "Jolly Old St. Nicholas"
18. "Jingle Bells"
19. "Down Through the Chimney"
20. "Santa Claus is Coming"
21. "Up on the Housetop"
22. "'Twas the Night Before Christmas"

=== Wee Sing in the Big Rock Candy Mountains (1991) ===
An imaginative young girl named Lisa waits until her two stuffed animals, the Snoodle Doodles come to life, and take her to a magical secret place called the Big Rock Candy Mountains with much food and fun, helping when her friends Debbie and Eric don't want to do what she wants to do. When they arrive there, Felicity Horse, Kaiso Cat, Profster Owl, and the Meecy Mice arrive late because of their issues with Little Bunny Foo Foo, who keeps bopping them on the head and angering the Good Fairy. How will they ever find out?

==== Songs ====
1. "Hide and Seek Chant"
2. "The Big Rock Candy Mountains"
3. "Howdy Ho-Hiya"
4. "Little Bunny Foo Foo"
5. "Ring Around the Rosie"
6. "Follow Me"
7. "Grizzly Bear"
8. Medley: "Grasshoppers Three"/"Fiddle-De-Dee"
9. "Fritzy Hammers"
10. "Upward Trail"
11. "The Washing Song"
12. "Sarasponda"
13. "Baby Birds"
14. "Row, Row, Row Your Boat"
15. "Nobody Likes Me"
16. "Little Bunny Foo Foo II"
17. "Nobody Knows the Trouble I've Seen"
18. "Smile"
19. "For He's a Jolly Good Fellow"
20. "Right Hand, Left Hand"
21. "Jimmy Crack Corn"
22. "The Big Rock Candy Mountains" (Reprise)

=== Wee Sing in the Marvelous Musical Mansion (1992) ===
Three children named Alex, Kelly, and Benji and their Auntie Annabella go to visit their Great Uncle Rubato in his Marvelous Musical Mansion where the music boxes come to life, the hat rack sings and dances, and the door knocker requires you to solve a riddle before you enter. However, in the darkness of the night, several small but important items vanish, requiring the children to locate the thief. Each segment teaches the viewer about musical theory or terminology. Wee Sing creators Pamela Conn Beall and Susan Hagen Nipp appear in this video as bird watchers named Marge and Madge.

==== Songs ====
1. "My Aunt Came Back"
2. "She'll Be Comin' Round the Mountain"
3. "How Do You Do?"
4. "My Hat, It Has Three Corners"
5. "The Orchestra Game Song"
6. "Tap-A-Cappella"
7. "The Ballerina's Waltz"
8. "The Doodle-Det Quintet"
9. "The Marching Song"
10. "Vive La Compagnie"
11. "The Melody Song"
12. "The Magic of Music"
13. "Hickory Dickory Dock"
14. "'Round the Clock"
15. "Oh Where, Oh Where?"
16. "Clap Your Hands"
17. "Rueben and Rachel"
18. "Hey Diddle Diddle"
19. "Oh Where, Oh Where?" (Reprise)
20. "The Orchestra Game Song" (Reprise)
21. "The Magic of Music" (Reprise)
22. "When the Saints Go Marching In"

=== The Wee Sing Train (1993) ===
Two children named Casey and Carter are magically transported into the world of their red, orange, yellow, and green toy train set, and begin a journey through helping several very different locations. Along the route, their engineer friend, Tusky the Elephant (voiced by Adair Chappell), learns how to be careful and think things through.

==== Songs ====
1. "Down by the Station"
2. "Train Is A-Comin'"
3. "Get on Board, Little Children"
4. "Home on the Range"
5. "The Old Chisholm Trail"
6. "Chuggin' Along"
7. "Put Your Little Foot Right There"
8. "Hey, Mr. Knickerbocker"
9. "Engine, Engine"
10. "The Vegetable Song"
11. "Had a Little Rooster"
12. "The Old Gray Mare"
13. "I Love the Mountains"
14. "Two Little Blackbirds"
15. "The Train Went Over the Mountain"
16. "Keemo Kymo"
17. "Jenny Jenkins"
18. "You Are Special"
19. "I've Been Working on the Railroad"
20. "Get on Board, Little Children" (Reprise)

=== Wee Sing Under the Sea (1994) ===
An ambitious young boy named Devin (played by Garrett Courtney) and his granny find an enchanted conch shell that takes them to the ocean floor where they encounter many undersea creatures, including an underwater jazz band and even Ottie (voiced by Patti Voglino), a fuzzy baby sea otter with brown and tan-colored body. Along the way they encounter Weeber (also voiced by Patti Voglino), a lost penguin with black and light blue-colored body who misses his way back to the South Pole, take him back home, and help him be comfortable with his odd light blue color, which makes him different. This story also touches on the destructive effects of pollution.

==== Songs ====
1. "Under the Sea"
2. "Ten Little Seashells"
3. "Creatures in the Sea"
4. "Bubble, Bubble"
5. "Little Baby Ottie"
6. "Down on the Ocean Floor"
7. "Twinkle Starfish"
8. "The Clam Dance"
9. "Sing Your Way Home"
10. "The Adding Game Song"
11. "One, Two, Whale That's Blue"
12. "Oh Dear, What Can the Matter Be?"
13. "You Are You"
14. "Sing Your Way Home" (Reprise)
15. "The Pollution Solution"
16. "Go Round and Round the Coral"
17. "I'm a Hermit Crab"
18. "Crabby Hermit Changed His Ways"
19. "Rockin' and Rollin' Under the Sea"
20. "Bubble, Bubble" (Reprise)

=== Wee Singdom: The Land of Music and Fun (1996) ===
Wee Sing characters Punchinello, Sillywhim, Little Bunny Foo Foo, Weeber, the Snoodle Doodles, and Trunky (originally Tusky) who are all six (the Snoodle Doodles counting as one) from the earlier Wee Sing Videos, ride the Wee Sing Train to Singalingaland where Singaling the humanoid monster-like mascot with yellow-colored body (voiced by Mikey Moran) and Warbly the bird-like mascot with green-colored body (voiced by Maureen Robinson) are hosting a big musical party called "The Wee Sing Festival". Singalingaland also happens to be an extension of Tim and Annie's game board. However, the main guest of honor (a singing rainbow, voiced by Diane Reynolds) is missing, so as each character performs his or her respective performance, Chugalong the Engine and Cubby the Caboose are sent to go look for her by asking a cirrus, stratus, cumulus cloud where she disappeared to. Eventually, she is found after Tim and Annie find her on their game board playing with their cat, Staccato, and as a reward, they are invited to attend the Wee Sing Festival, and the singing rainbow is able to perform her special color song.

==== Songs ====
1. "Off We Go to Singalingaland"
2. "We Welcome You (Here We Are in Singalingaland)"
3. "You're My Special Friend"
4. "Time for the Show to Start"
5. "Going on a Bunny Hunt"
6. "Nobody Knows the Trouble I've Seen"
7. "Rig-a-Jig-Jig"
8. "Frère Jacques"
9. "Mary Had a Little Lamb"
10. "I Am a Cirrus Cloud"
11. "I Am a Stratus Cloud"
12. "Juggling, Juggling, Toss the Ball"
13. "The Marching Dance"
14. "The Rhyming Game"
15. "It Isn't Any Trouble Just to Rhyme a Word or Two"
16. "The Reflection Dance"
17. "I Am a Cumulus Cloud"
18. "Polly Wolly Doodle"
19. "One Elephant Went Out to Play"
20. "Colors of the Rainbow"
21. "We Sing-a-Ling-a-Ling with All Our Hearts to You"

=== Wee Sing Favorites: Animal Songs (1996) ===
This first video features 17 clips from different Wee Sing Videos that include an animal song with each of the intervals between them featuring an animated clip of Singaling (voiced by Mona Marshall) and Warbly (voiced by Penny Sweet).

==== Songs ====
1. "B-I-N-G-O" (from Wee Sing Together)
2. "Had a Little Rooster" (from The Wee Sing Train)
3. "Little Baby Ottie" (from Wee Sing Under the Sea)
4. "Little Miss Muffet" (from King Cole's Party)
5. "Eensy Weensy Spider" (from Wee Sing Together)
6. "Do Your Ears Hang Low?" (from Wee Sing in Sillyville)
7. "The Old Gray Mare" (from The Wee Sing Train)
8. "One, Two, Whale That's Blue" (from Wee Sing Under the Sea)
9. "Grasshoppers Three" (from Wee Sing in the Big Rock Candy Mountains)
10. "Little Peter Rabbit" (from Wee Sing Together)
11. "Frog Round" (from Wee Sing in Sillyville)
12. "Mary Had a Little Lamb" (from King Cole's Party)
13. "I'm a Hermit Crab" (from Wee Sing Under the Sea)
14. "Two Little Blackbirds" (from The Wee Sing Train)
15. "Old MacDonald Had a Farm" (from Wee Sing Together)

=== Wee Sing Favorites: Classic Songs for Kids (1996) ===
This second and final video features 16 clips from different Wee Sing Videos that include a classic children's song with each of the intervals between them featuring an animated clip of Singaling (voiced by Mona Marshall) and Warbly (voiced by Penny Sweet).

==== Songs ====
1. "The Alphabet Song" (from Wee Sing Together)
2. "Jack and Jill" (from King Cole's Party)
3. "The Farmer in the Dell" (from Grandpa's Magical Toys)
4. "Row, Row, Row Your Boat" (from Wee Sing in the Big Rock Candy Mountains)
5. "Rain, Rain, Go Away" (from Wee Sing Together)
6. "Home on the Range" (from The Wee Sing Train)
7. "The Hokey Pokey" (from Grandpa's Magical Toys)
8. "Jack Be Nimble" (from King Cole's Party)
9. "Boom, Boom, Ain't It Great to Be Crazy?" (from Wee Sing in Sillyville)
10. "Ring Around the Rosie" (from Wee Sing in the Big Rock Candy Mountains)
11. "Humpty Dumpty" (from King Cole's Party)
12. "The Muffin Man" (from Grandpa's Magical Toys)
13. "Twinkle, Twinkle, Little Star" (from Wee Sing Together)
14. "Star Light, Star Bright" (from The Best Christmas Ever)
15. "Playmate" (from Grandpa's Magical Toys)

== Books and Audio ==
=== Wee Sing Classic Line ===
- Wee Sing Children's Songs and Fingerplays (1977) (first released as Wee Sing)
- Wee Sing and Play (1979)
- Wee Sing Silly Songs (1981)
- Wee Sing Sing-Alongs (1982) (first released as Wee Sing Around the Campfire)
- Wee Sing for Christmas (1984)
- Wee Sing Nursery Rhymes and Lullabies (1985)
- Wee Sing Bible Songs (1986)
- Wee Sing America (1987)
- Wee Sing for Fun 'n' Folk (1989)
- Wee Sing Dinosaurs (1991)
- Wee Sing Around the World (1994)
- Wee Sing More Bible Songs (1995)
- Wee Sing for Baby (1996)
- Wee Sing Games Games Games (1998)
- Wee Sing in the Car (1999)
- Wee Sing Animals Animals Animals (1999)
- Wee Sing and Pretend (2001)
- Wee Sing the Best of Wee Sing (2002) (first released as Wee Sing 25th Anniversary Celebration)
- Wee Sing for Halloween (2002)
- Wee Sing Mother Goose (2005)
- Wee Sing and Move (2009)
- Wee Sing Lullabies (2012)

=== Wee Sing & Learn ===
- Wee Sing & Learn ABCs
- Wee Sing & Learn 123s
- Wee Sing & Learn Colors
- Wee Sing & Learn Dinosaurs
- Wee Sing & Learn Opposites
- Wee Sing & Learn Bugs
- Wee Sing & Learn My Body

=== Wee Color ===
- Wee Color Wee Sing
- Wee Color Wee Sing and Play
- Wee Color Wee Sing Silly Songs
- Wee Color Wee Sing Around the Campfire
- Wee Color Wee Sing for Christmas
- Wee Color Wee Sing Nursery Rhymes and Lullabies
- Wee Color Wee Sing Bible Songs
- Wee Color Wee Sing America
- Wee Color Wee Sing Australia
- Wee Color Wee Sing Dinosaurs
- Wee Color Wee Sing Together
- Wee Color Wee Sing King Cole's Party

== Apps ==
- Wee Sing & Learn ABCs
- Wee Sing & Learn 123s

== Reception ==
Anne Reeks of Entertainment Weekly reviewed the first six Wee Sing videos, giving them grades between A and C.
