= Red Roman =

Red Roman may refer to

- Solifugae, an order of Arachnida, also known as camel spiders, wind scorpions or sun spiders
- Chrysoblephus laticeps, a Southern African marine fish
