= Lucky Rabbit =

Lucky Rabbit may refer to:

- Oswald the Lucky Rabbit, a cartoon character and the cartoon itself
- El conejo de la suerte, a Spanish singing game, or the name of the song
- Lucky rabbit charm
- "Lucky Rabbit", a character from the Lucky Town designed by Susumu Matsushita
