= Nanay =

Nanay may refer to:

- Nanay River, a river in Peru
- Nanay, tatay, a Filipino children's game
- Bence Nanay, philosopher
- Nanai people, Tungusic people in East Asia and the Russian Far East
  - Nanai language, the native language of the Nanai people
- Nanay/Nanaya, a Mesopotamian deity
