= Pretty Little Dutch Girl =

Nursery rhyme

Nursery rhyme
- Published: 1940s
- Songwriter: Unknown

"Pretty Little Dutch Girl" is a children's nursery rhyme, clapping game and jump-rope rhyme. It has a Roud Folk Song Index number of 12986.

== Lyrics ==
The lyrics of the song vary considerably. British versions of this rhyme differ significantly, perhaps because many of the allusions in the rhyme were unknown to British children at the time. Common versions include:

I am a pretty little Dutch girl,
As pretty as I can be, be, be,
And all the boys in the baseball team
Go crazy over me, me, me.

My boy friend’s name is Fatty,
He comes from the Senoratti,
With turned-up toes and a pimple on his nose,
And this is how the story goes:

== Story told within the song ==
The rhyme (and at least some of its variants) tells the story of an extremely beautiful girl (of Dutch descent, hence the song's title) who is popular with boys (particularly around the neighborhood, block or the whole town) and has a rather unattractive boyfriend; some versions mention that the boyfriend dumps the pretty Dutch girl in favor of an even prettier girl. The Dutch girl is often depicted from illustration to illustration wearing traditional Dutch clothing, complete with ribbon-adorned long braids in her hair, wooden shoes and (occasionally exaggerated) Dutch cap. The rhyme follows with another variation, where the Dutch girl receives peaches, pears, and 50 cents from her boyfriend, which she then gives back to him and kicks him down the stairs. This is a play on the betrayal the Dutch girl feels after her boyfriend leaves her for another girl (variation 3), the Dutch girl's revenge for her boyfriend throwing her down the stairs (variation 9), as well as the Dutch girl's frustration with the boys around her neighborhood leaving her alone after enticing her (variation 8). Within each of these variations, the Dutch girl ultimately defends herself against her boyfriend and the group of boys in her neighborhood rather than simply accepting their disloyalty. While the nursery rhyme expresses this in a witty manner, it is also an informative story that may teach little girls not to accept mistreatment because of charm, admiration, and captivation with favorable items.

== Origins and distribution ==
The origins of the rhyme are obscure. The tune of the song is similar to "A Sailor Went to Sea" and "Miss Suzie Had A Steamboat" (though some notes are removed to account for the double-syllable words "pretty" and "little", and some notes are added in). The earliest record found so far is for New York around 1940. It seems to have spread over the US by the 1950s and reached Britain in 1959, where it was taken up very quickly across the country to become one of the most popular skipping rhymes among girls.

The tune is also used in British pubs as a drinking song in which a person is challenged by their companions to down their drink. This version goes like this:

We like to drink with (insert name here)
'Cause (insert name here) is our mate.
And when we drink with (insert name here)
He/she/they finish(es) in 8! 7! 6! 5! 4! 3! 2! 1!

== Use in children's media ==
In the Wee Sing Video Series video Grandpa's Magical Toys, the song is represented and sung by a blonde-haired Barbie-like doll in Dutch traditional costume aptly named "Dutch Girl", played by Jacqueline Drew.

In the 1977 Australian animated film Dot and the Kangaroo, two hopping mice near the end of the waterhole scene sang a song about a bushgirl to the tune of Pretty Little Dutch Girl.
