= Bang Bang Lulu =

Traditional American song

"Bang Bang Lulu" is a traditional American song with many variations. It derives from older songs most commonly known as "Bang Bang Rosie" in Ireland, "Bang Away Lulu" in Appalachia, and "My Lula Gal" in the West. (Note: Other titles include "Bang Bang"; "When Lulu's Gone"; "Bang Away, My Lulu"; "She Is a Lulu"; "She hugged me and kissed me"; or versions with the name replaced by Lu Lu, Rosie, Suzie, Lula, & al.) The form "Bang Bang Lulu" became widespread in the United States from its use as a cadence during the World Wars. The song uses the tune of "Goodnight, Ladies".

== Traditional song ==
All versions concern a woman and her various lovers. The early forms were sometimes very directly crude, violent, or infanticidal. Published versions probably drastically understate the song's popularity, particularly since the first mentions allude to 78 or 900 additional verses unfit for printing. Robert Gordon, the first head of the Library of Congress's Archive of American Folk Song, included his variants of Lulu among the "Inferno" section which was excluded from the library's general collection for its "bawdy and scatological subject matter".

One verse appeared in Owen Wister's 1902 novel on p. 96 The Virginian:

If you go to monkey with my Looloo girl,
I'll tell you what I'll do:
I'll carve out your heart with my razor, AND
I'll shoot you with my pistol, too—

The Cisco Kid sings a smattering of "Bang Bang Lulu" in O. Henry's 1907 story "The Caballero Way.

Don't you monkey with my Lulu girl
Or I'll tell you what I'll do

Nine appeared in Carl Sandburg's 1927 American Songbag among its "Railroad and Work Gangs" songs, including Wister's and:

My Lulu hugged and kissed me,
She wrung my hand and cried,
She said I was the sweetest thing
That ever lived or died.

My Lulu's tall and slender,
My Lulu gal's tall and slim;
But the only thing that satisfies her
Is a good big drink of gin.

My Lulu gal's a daisy,
She wears a big white hat;
I bet your life when I'm in town
The dudes all hit the flat.

I ain't goin' to work on the railroad,
I ain't goin' to lie in jail,
But I'm goin' down to Cheyenne town
To live with my Lulu gal.

My Lulu, she's an angel,
Only she aint got no wings.
I guess I'll get her a wedding ring,
When the grass gets green next spring.

My Lulu, she's a dandy,
She stands and drinks like a man,
She calls for gin and brandy,
And she doesn't give a damn.

Engineer blowed the whistle,
Fireman rang the bell,
Lulu, in a pink kimona
Says, "Baby, oh fare you well."

I seen my Lulu in the springtime,
I seen her in the fall;
She wrote me a letter in the winter time,
Says, "Good-bye, honey," that's all.

Sandburg credited many of the verses he knew as derived from the 17th-century Scotch song "Way Up on Clinch Mountain", now usually known as "Rye Whiskey".

Roy Acuff and his Crazy Tennesseans recorded "When Lulu's Gone" under the pseudonym of the Bang Boys in 1936. Another version—"Lulu"—was recorded by Oscar Brand on his 1958 Old Time Bawdy Sea Shanties. Verses from this song also developed into "Roll in My Sweet Baby's Arms", recorded by Bill Monroe and Flatt & Scruggs and many others after them.

== Military cadences ==
Most military cadences suggested explicit rhymes but skipped back to the chorus rather than complete them:

...Lulu had a boyfriend
He drove a garbage truck
'Never got no garbage
'Cos all he did was
Bang bang Lulu
Lulu's gone away
Who's gonna bang bang
Now Lulu's gone away...

...Lulu has an uncle (whoa
Her uncle's name is Chuck
Every time he's at her house
She'd always want to
Bang bang Lulu
Lulu has gone away
Bang bang Lulu
Lulu is here to stay...

...Lulu had a chicken
She also had a duck
She put them on the table
To see if they would
Bang away on Lulu
Bang away all day
Who you gonna bang on
When Lulu's gone away?...

...Lulu has two boyfriends
Both of them are rich
One's the son of a banker
The others a son of a

Bang bang Lulu
Lulu's gone away
Who's gonna bang bang Lulu
while Lulu's gone away?

...Lulu has a bicycle(whoa)
the seat's on back to front
Every time she sits on it
It goes right up her

Bang bang Lulu
Lulu's gone away
Who's gonna bang bang Lulu
while Lulu's gone away?

== Ska ==
A Calypso version of the military cadences was recorded by The Merrymen on their 1967 album Sing And Swing With The Merrymen. From there, the song was recorded by early Ska musicians like Lloyd Charmers in the 1970s and then later covered by various pop artists including Goombay Dance Band and Boney M.

The Skadows from England released a version of the song that featured on their debutalbum Ska'd for life (1982)

Bang Bang Lulu were also a Ska and Soul revival band in the UK. They formed in 2005 and released the album Ska Wars.

A Boeing B-17G-100-BO 43-38905 of the 708th Bomb Squadron, 447th Bombardment Group (H) was named "Bang Bang Lulu" based at Rattlesden, Suffolk, U.K.

== Boney M. version ==
"Bang Bang Lulu"

Single by Boney M.

from the album Eye Dance
- Released: June 1986
- Recorded: 1985
- Genre: Pop
- Length: 3:31 (7" mix); 3:58 (12" mix)
- Label: Hansa Records (FRG); Carrere (UK)
- Songwriters: Traditional, Frank Farian
- Producer: Frank Farian

Boney M. singles chronology
"Daddy Cool (Anniversary Recording '86)" (1986)	"Bang Bang Lulu" (1986)	"Rivers of Babylon (Remix)" (1988)

Audio video
- "Bang Bang Lulu" on YouTube

"Bang Bang Lulu" was a 1986 single by the German band Boney M. It was taken from their final album, the 1985 Eye Dance. The single failed to chart, and the group, having disbanded after their tenth anniversary, did not promote it. It was originally intended for Liz Mitchell to sing, but she found the lyrics vulgar and refused to do it. Instead, Reggie Tsiboe did the lead vocals, backed by session singers Amy and Elaine Goff.

=== Releases ===
- "Bang Bang Lulu" (7" single remix) - 3:31 / "Calendar Song" (Farian) - 2:37 (Hansa 108 395-100, Germany)
- "Bang Bang Lulu" (12" remix) - 3:58 / "Calendar Song" - 2:37 / "Chica da Silva" - 4:35 (Hansa 608 395-213, Germany)

== See also ==
- "Miss Lucy had a baby..."
- "Miss Susie had a steamboat..."
