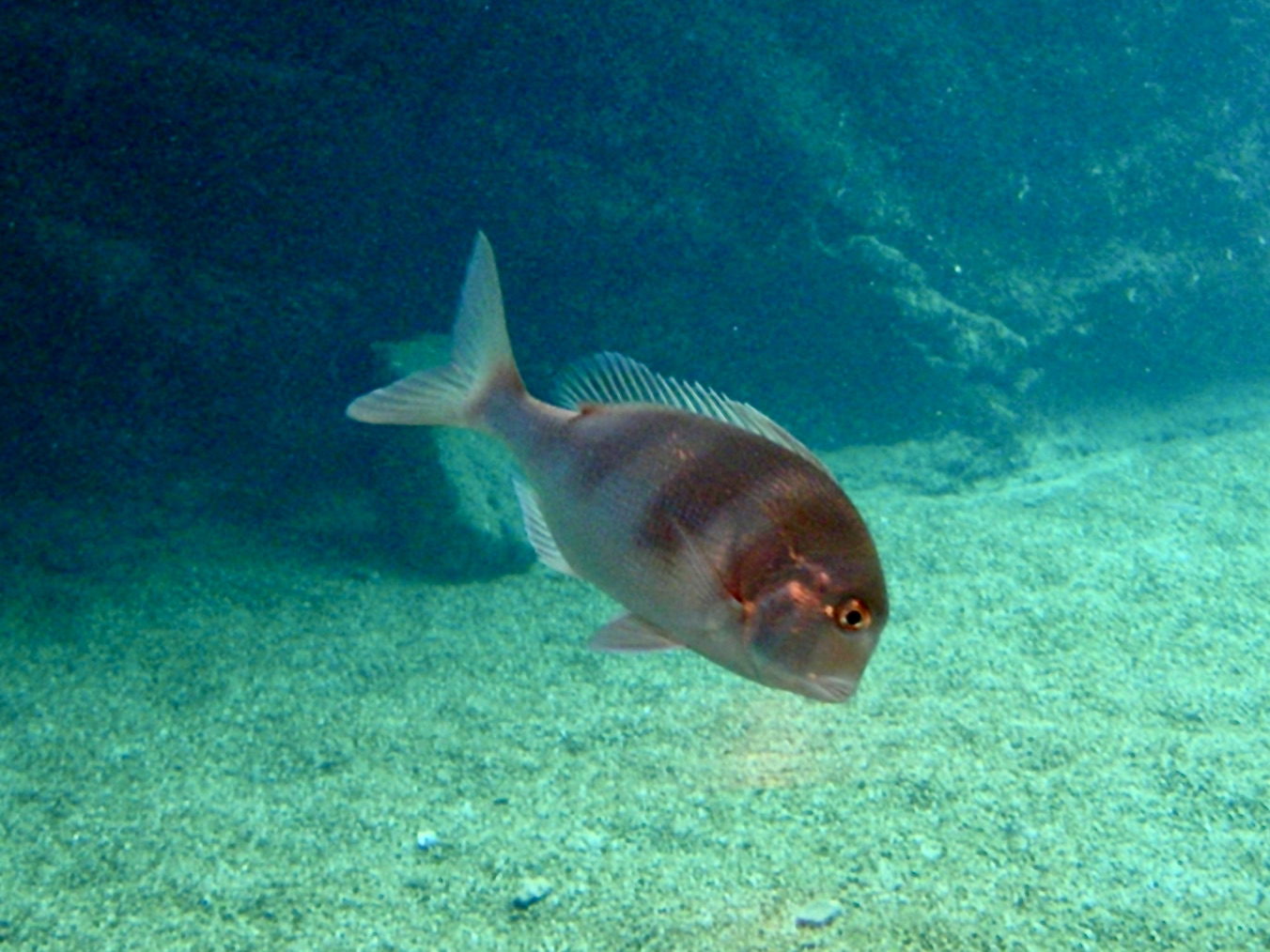

Conservation status
- Near Threatened (IUCN 3.1)

Scientific classification
- Kingdom: Animalia
- Phylum: Chordata
- Class: Actinopterygii
- Order: Acanthuriformes
- Family: Sparidae
- Genus: Chrysoblephus
- Species: C. anglicus

Binomial name
- Chrysoblephus anglicus (Gilchrist & W. W. Thompson, 1908)

Synonyms
- Chrysophrys anglicus Gilchrist & Thompson, 1908

= Chrysoblephus anglicus =

Species of fish endemic to South Africa

Chrysoblephus anglicus, the Englishman seabream, is a species of marine ray-finned fish belonging to the family Sparidae, the seabreams and porgies. This fish is endemic to Southern Africa.

== Taxonomy ==
Chrysoblephus anglicus was first formally described as Chrysophrys anglicus in 1908 by the ichthyologists John Dow Fisher Gilchrist, a Scot, and William Wardlaw Thompson, a South African, with its type locality given as Durban in KwaZulu-Natal, South Africa. The genus Chrysoblephus is placed in the family Sparidae within the order Spariformes by the 5th edition of Fishes of the World. Some authorities classify this genus in the subfamily Sparinae, but the 5th edition of Fishes of the World does not recognise subfamilies within the Sparidae.

== Etymology ==
Chrysoblephus anglicus has the specific name anglicus, which means "English". This presumably follows its common name in South Africa, Englishman seabream.

== Description ==
Chrysoblephus anglicus has a dorsal fin which is supported by 12 spines, the third to fifth spines are elongated but they are no longer than the length of the head, and 10 soft rays. The anal fin contains 3 spines and 8 soft rays. It has a deep and compressed body with a blunt snout, the dorsal profile of the head between the upper lip and the forehead is almost vertical, before sloping gently to the orogn of the dorsal fin. The overall colour of this fish is reddish, paler ventrally, with around 4 darker reddish vertical bars which may be very indistinct. The scales have blue spots on them which form rows. The Englishman seabream has a maximum published total length of 100 cm (39 in), although 40 cm (16 in) is more typical.

== Distribution and habitat ==
Chrysoblephus anglicus is endemic to the southwestern Indian Ocean where it is found between the mouth of the Limpopo River in southern Mozambique to Algoa Bay in the Eastern Cape, South Africa. It is found on coral and rocky reefs at depths between 15 and 20 m (49 and 66 ft).

== Biology ==
Chrysoblephus anglicus feeds on crabs, prawns, bivalves, squid and, sometimes, fish. It may ben found as a solitary fish or in small schools, sometimes mixed with C. puniceus. The reproductive biology of this species is little known but spawning occurs in the spring and some adults are protogynous.

== Fisheries and conservation ==
Chrysoblephus anglicus ranks as the fifth most important reef fish species landed by the commercial line fishery off Kwazulu-Natal. Stock assessments have shown that the stock had "collapsed" and there were indications that Englishman seabream is being increasingly targeted in KwaZulu-Natal, as other preferred linefish species decline in abundance due to overfishing. There was roughly a 70% decline in this species landed between 1987 and 2007. This species is endemic to Southern Africa with a limited range and is suspected to be, at least partially, a protogynous hermaphrodite. This means that overexploitation of larger fishes results in the sex ratio of the adults becoming skewed in favour of females. This evidence of overfishing, population declines have led to a number of stock management measures being put in place for this species. The IUCN have classified this species as being Near Threatened.
