= Miss Lucy had a baby =

Children's rhyme and clapping game

"Miss Lucy had a baby...", also known by various other names, (Note: Including "Miss Lucy", "Ms. Lucy", "Ask Me No Questions", "The Lady with the Alligator Purse", "The Johnsons had a baby...", and variations where the mother is named "Susie", "Suzie", "Lulu", and "Virginia".) is an American schoolyard rhyme. Originally used as a jump-rope chant, it is now more often sung alone or as part of a clapping game. It has many variations, possibly originating from it, or from its predecessors.

The song is often combined or confused with the similar but cruder "Miss Susie had a steamboat", which uses the same tune and was also used as a jump-rope game.

== Structure ==
As in "Miss Susie", the rhyme is organized by its meter, an accentual verse, in trimeter. Accentual verse allows for set number of accents regardless of the number of syllables in the verse. It is a common form in English folk verse, especially in nursery rhymes and jump-rope rhymes. The song shares much of the same melody as the 1937 "The Merry-Go-Round Broke Down" used by Warner Bros. as the theme to their Looney Tunes cartoons.

== History ==
The history of the Miss Susie similar rhyme has been studied, tracing it back to the 1950s, in Josepha Sherman's article published by the American Folklore Society. However, several other books and articles show similar versions used as far back as the end of the 19th century.

"Miss Lucy" probably developed from verses of much older (and cruder) songs, although the opposite may also be true, most commonly known as "Bang Bang Rosie" in Britain, "Bang Away Lulu" in Appalachia, and "My Lula Gal" in the West. These songs were sometimes political, usually openly crude, and occasionally infanticidal.

In those songs, the baby, that was dropped in the chamber pot bathtub, was referencing an enormously popular mascot of Force cereal named Sunny Jim, introduced in the United States in 1902 and in Britain a few years later. Following his declining popularity, the baby is now usually encountered as Tiny Tim, once famous as a Depression-era comic strip and still well known as a character in Charles Dickens's A Christmas Carol. The verse was first recorded as a joke in the 1920s and as the modern children's song in New York in 1938. Although the song derives from lyrics about an unwed whore, few children consider that Miss Lucy might be unmarried; instead, the concern of the song has shifted to the appearance of new siblings. The opening lines now often change to "My mother had a baby..." or "I had a little brother..."

The variants including a woman with an alligator purse urging the baby's mother to vote have been seen as a reference to Susan B. Anthony, an American suffragette, It was later attributed to a social worker which was their typical dress code in the 1950s

A version of the song appeared in Alfred Hitchcock's 1964 film Marnie, about a woman overcoming a childhood trauma. Although the ending seems closed, some argue the song serves to ironically establish that nothing ever was wrong with the title character. It also appears in country singer Chely Wright's song "Alligator Purse" from her 1996 album Right in the Middle of It.

In the 1990s the singer Lucy Peach popularized a version of the song with the words "I had a little turtle, its name was Tiny Tim". Following that, there have been versions of "Miss Suzy had a turtle, she called it Tiny Tim", and an Egyptian Tortoise was named Tiny Tim at the Zoological Society of London Whipsnade Zoo. The Australian children's music group The Wiggles made a version called "Murray had a Turtle".

== The nicknames 'Miss Lucy' and 'Tiny Tim' ==
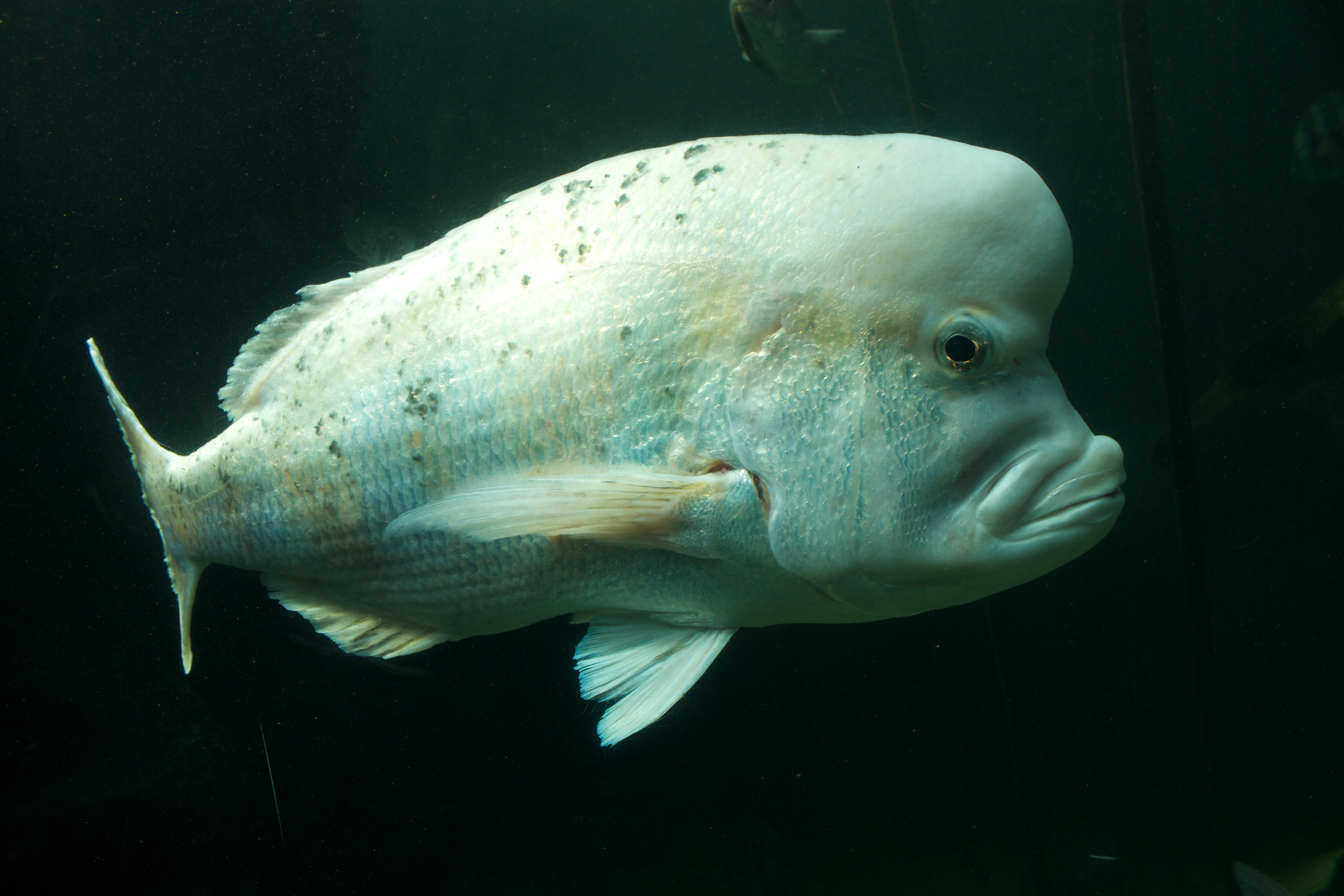
The fish Chrysoblephus gibbiceps nicknamed Miss Lucy in Western Africa

The nickname 'Miss Lucy' has been used in the context of literature and art:

- Miss Lucy is the main character in the song "Miss Lucy Long", introduced in 1843, which has the same meter and rhythmic structure of a repeated couplet, and a very similar tune. The song was popular at blackface minstrel shows.
- 'Miss Lucy Neal' was a popular African-American song published in 1854.
- 'Miss Luce Negro' - was the nickname of a brothel owner hypothesized to be the Dark Lady in several of William Shakespeare's writings.

A version of the song has been "Miss Lucy had a steamboat". A famous steamboat disaster tied to the name Lucy occurred in 1844, when the Lucy Walker steamboat, a ship named after a race-horse owned by a Cherokee native American and run by a team of his African American slaves, blew up.

In Western Africa, the name "Miss Lucy" is the nickname of an endangered species of fish Chrysoblephus gibbiceps.

The nickname 'Tiny Tim' has been used in the context of art and literature;

- Tiny Tim is the nickname of a fictional character Timothy Cratchit in 'A Christmas Carol' by Charles Dickens from 1843.
- Herbert Khaury, the American singer and ukulele player began using the stage name Tiny Tim in 1962.

== Lyrics ==
Several versions exist, varying across time and regionally:

America
(early version)

Miss Susie had a baby
His name was Tiny Tim
She put him in the bathtub
To see if he could swim.

He drank up all the water.
He ate up all the soap.
He tried to eat the bathtub
But it wouldn't go down his throat.

Miss Susie called the doctor.
The doctor called the nurse.
The nurse called the lady
With the alligator purse.

Out ran the doctor.
Out ran the nurse.
Out ran the lady
With the alligator purse.*

And now Tiny Tim
Is home sick in bed,
With soap in his throat
And bubbles in his head.

- (Also: "With a baby in her purse.")

Britain
(1970s)

The Johnsons had a baby
They called him Tiny Tim, Tim, Tim
They put him in a bathtub
To see if he could swim, swim, swim

He drank up all the water
He ate a bar of soap, soap, soap
"Mummy, mummy, I feel ill
"Send for the doctor down the hill"

In came the doctor
In came the nurse
In came the lady
With the alligator purse

"Doctor, doctor, will I die?"
"Yes, my son, but do not cry.
"Close your eyes and
"Count to ten."

1 - 2 - 3 - 4 - 5
6 - 7 - 8 - 9 - 10

Out went the doctor
Out went the nurse
Out went the lady
With the alligator purse

Miss Lucy had a baby,
she called him Tiny Tim!
She put him in the bathtub
to see if he could swim.

He drank up all the water,
he ate up all the soap.
He tried to eat the bathtub
but it wouldn't go down his throat.

Miss Lucy called the doctor,
Miss Lucy called the nurse.
Miss Lucy called the lady
with the alligator purse.

In came the doctor,
in came the nurse.
In came the lady
with the alligator purse.

'Mumps' - said the doctor.
'Measles'- said the nurse.
'Nothing' - said the lady
with the alligator purse.

or

'Cough'- said the doctor.
'Cold' - said the nurse.
'Pizza' - said the lady
with the alligator purse.

Miss Lucy hit the doctor
Miss Lucy slapped the nurse
Miss Lucy paid the lady
with the alligator purse

Out went the water.
Out went the soap,
Out went the bathtub,
that wouldn't go down his throat.

Out went the doctor,
Out went the nurse.
Out went the lady
with the alligator purse.

== See also ==
- "Miss Susie had a steamboat..."
- "Bang Bang Lulu..."
- "Miss Lucy Long"
- See Tiny Tim (disambiguation) for several real and fictional people, institutions and projects called Tiny Tim after this song.
