= Stella Ella Ola =

Clapping game

"Stella Ella Ola" (Stella Stella Ola), also known as "Quack Dilly Oso" or "Oom Pah Pea", is a clapping game where players stand or sit in a circle placing one hand over their neighbour's closer hand and sing the song. On every beat, a person claps their higher hand onto the touching person's palm. The cycle continues until the song ends at which point if the person's hand is slapped, they are considered "out" and must stand or sit in the center of the circle, or leave the circle and watch this from the edges.

== Lyrics ==
Stella Ella Ola,
Clap, clap, clap
Say yes, chica, chica
Chica, chica, cha
say yes chica, chica
Bologna, bologna
With cheese and macaroni
Fire 1, 2, 3, 4, 5!

A common variant of Stella Ella Ola, Quack Dilly Oso, follows the same game rules:

Quack dilly oso,
Quack quack quack,
Señorita,
rita rita rita,
flora, flora,
flora flora flora,
1, 2, 3, 4!

Another variant, Oom Pah Pea:

Oom Pah Pea
Colony Colonesta
Oom Pah Pea
O Colony
Acadamie Safari
Acadamie Puff Puff
1, 2, 3, 4!

With potentially some variations. The most common of these include substituting “Rita Rita Rita” for “Your mama smells like pizza” or “San Diego, Reno, Reno, Reno”, replacing “fellow” with “galore” or “flora” or nonsense words such as “galora” and “delora”, and rendering the name and first line as any of a number of similar variations (“Quack Diddly Oso”, “Quack A Dilly Oh My”, “Quack A Dilly Omer”, etc.). The facts of the song’s obscure lyrics in any form and of its being mainly spread by children makes it highly susceptible to variance, so finding versions that are in any sense “definitive” is impossible—the versions listed on this page are merely intended to be representative.

== Variations ==
=== Two players ===
- Players slap both hands up and down. In some variations, they continue to alternate until the final count, where the person whose hands are on the bottom is out.
- Players grab each other's right hand just by the fingers and then hold their left hands out to the side. They move their linked right hands from side to side, hitting a left hand on each count. If that child swings her or his hand away on the last count, the other loses.
- Players hold hands and on the last count, they try to pull the other person over a line.
- Players hold hands, with one player's arms crossed, and swing their hands side to side so that the player with crossed arms changes. Whoever ends with their arms crossed (or doesn't, depending on where you are) wins. Sometimes you are allowed to pull each other's arms crossed at the end to see who wins.

=== Three players(Or More) ===
- In one multiple player version, one player will turn around and the other two players will hold hands and alternate positions. At the end, the person who is turned around will say either top or bottom. The hand who is in that position is champ.
- In another, which can be played with as many people as players wish, but has a minimum of three players, all participants sit in a circle. Their right hand rests on top of the left hand of the player on their right. One person starts, by lifting their right hand, and slapping the right hand of the player on their left. At the end, the person who has the last slap will either slap the hand of the person beside them, or that person will yank their hand away, causing the slapper to hit their own hand. The player that is hit is then out. If no one is hit, the player who was slapping is out.

== Appearances in other media ==
- The lyrics sung in the game make an appearance in track 10 of Børns' album Blue Madonna "Supernatural".
- The game also makes an appearance in season 6 episode 3 of the CBC show Mr. D.
- A variant was sung on Sesame Street to demonstrate the letter Q.
- The game was played on an episode of Zoom (1999 TV series).
