= Mary Mack =

Children's clapping game

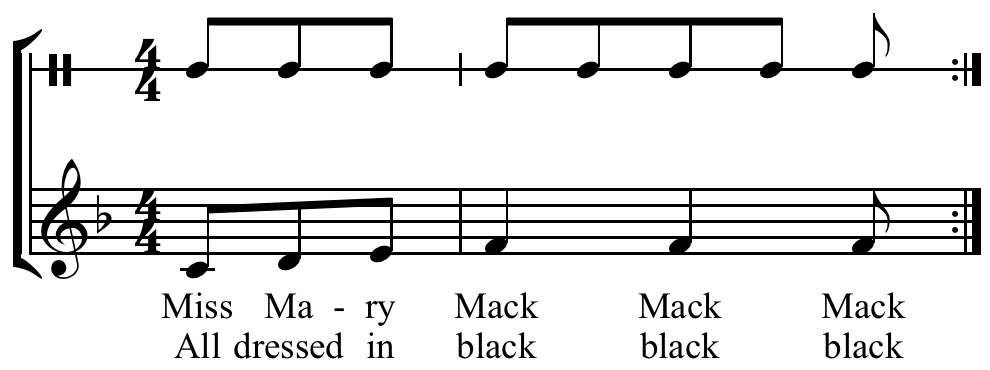
Melody

"Mary Mack", also known as "Miss Mary Mack", is a clapping game of unknown origin. It is well known in various parts of the United States, Australia, Canada, and in New Zealand and has been called "the most common hand-clapping game in the English-speaking world".

== Description ==
In the game, two children stand or sit opposite to each other, and clap hands according to the rhyming song. In some places, the repeated notes are given a quarter note triplet rhythmic value or sounded early to syncopate the rhythm.

The same song is also used as a skipping-rope rhyme.

== History ==
An early version of a verse of "Mary Mack" collected in West Chester, Pennsylvania appears in the book The Counting Out Rhymes of Children by Henry Carrington Bolton (1888).

Other early sources (1902, 1905) show variations of "She asked her mother for fifty cents to see the elephant jump the fence" with no mention of Mary Mack.

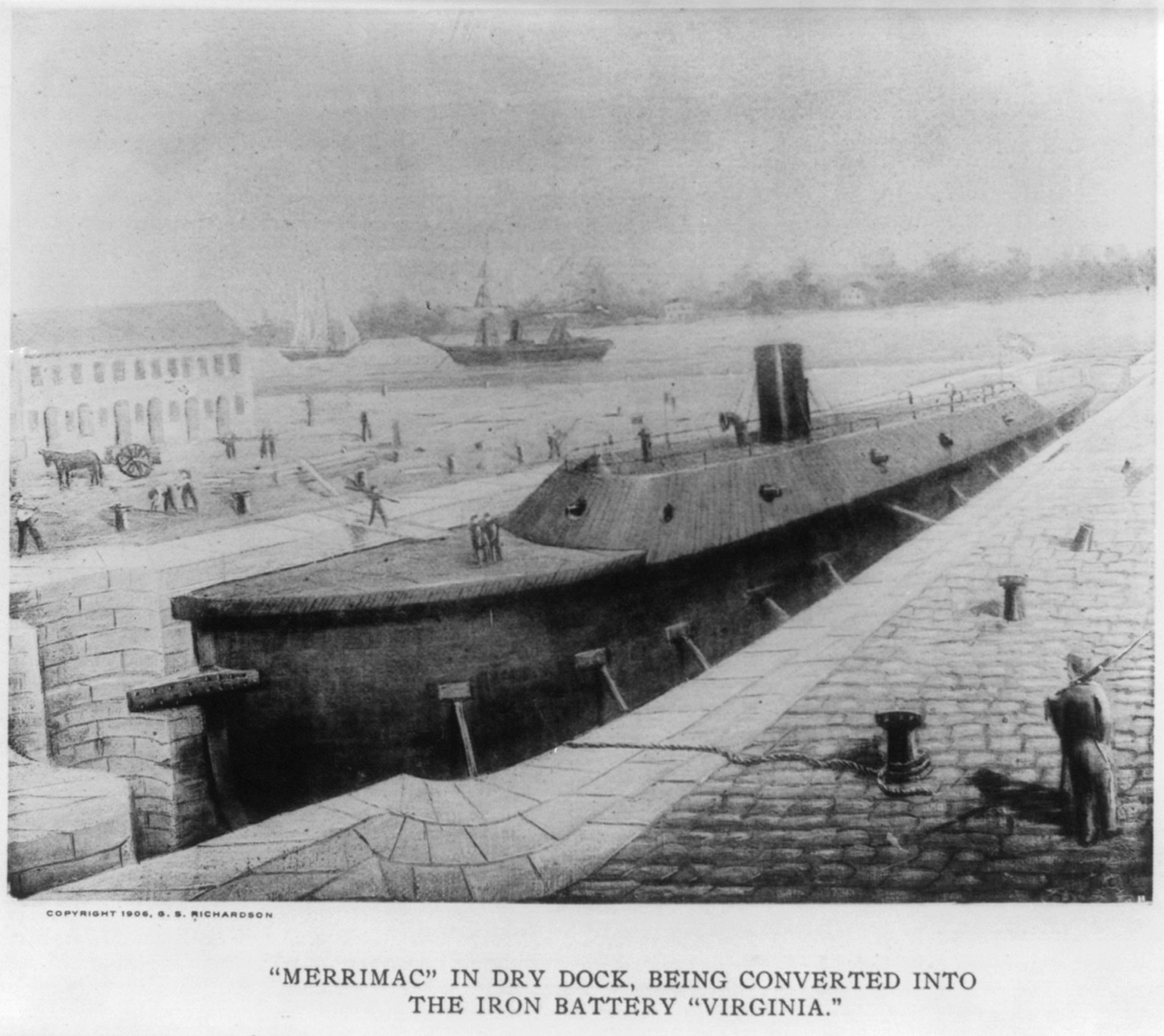
Merrimac in dry dock being converted into the ironclad "Virginia"

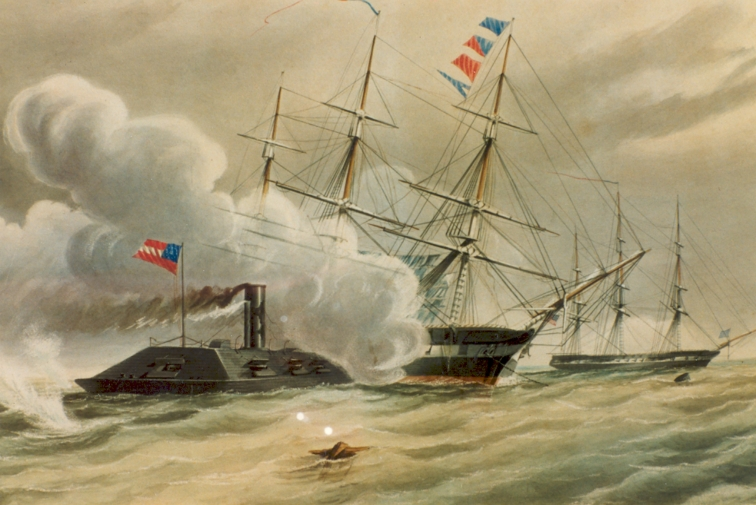
The ironclad Merrimac (CSS Virginia) rams the USS Cumberland 1862

The origin of the name Mary Mack is obscure, and various theories have been proposed. One theory is that it was a reference to a performer in Ephraim Williams’s circus in the 1880s, which also explains the references to elephants. According to another theory, Mary Mack originally referred to the USS Merrimack, an American steam frigate of the mid-1800s named after the Merrimack River that would have originally had a black hull with a white stripe along the gun deck before it was scuttled in April 1861 when Confederate rebels took the Norfolk,VA naval yard at the outbreak of the Civil War. Only being burned to the waterline, the Merrimac was repurposed as an ironclad for the Confederacy, rechristened the "CSS Virginia" — a ship that would have looked like a riveted black whale with a steam pipe. “[A] large vessel shaped like a roof of a house, with one smokestack,” as it was described by those who worked on or encountered it in battle. This would make the lines "She asked her mother… for 50 cents… To see the elephants… jump over the fence" of the nursery rhyme a reference to the Merrimac's brief and disappointing showing in the war before being "dressed in black...with silver buttons down her back" — as in the first verse — by the rebels who stormed the "fence" of the naval yard. Or could as easily reference her brief but noteworthy stint as the CSS Virginia:

"The Virginia was only engaged in a few battles in her short existence. On March 8, 1862, she entered into battle for the first time against Federal vessels. Though still unfinished, the Virginia rammed the USS Cumberland and sank her, destroyed the USS Congress, damaged the USS Minnesota, and chased away the USS St. Lawrence and USS Roanoke. The next day, the Virginia and the Monitor locked in a five hour battle in which the Virginia finally dislodged the pilot-house of the Monitor and caused it to retreat".

A month later, the Merrimac (CSS Virginia) would run aground attempting to escape Union capture and again be set afire — this time the ship exploded. So goes the nursery rhyme: "They jumped so high… They reached the sky… And didn't come back… Till the Fourth of July…"

Interestingly, "seeing the elephant" began as an 1840's expression associated with the rare opportunity of glimpsing an elephant at a circus. In 1850, P.T. Barnum's circus acquired elephants, making the opportunity to see an elephant more widespread so that the expression evolved into an idiom for having "seen the sights", and was thus eventually associated with the traveling experiences of military service during the Mexican War. From there, "to see the elephant" spread across the United States as a common idiom meaning: "To see the ele•phant | idiom | To see the world; to gain knowledge by experience. The cost is oftentimes understood to be more than the thing is worth." During the Civil War, battle itself became "the elephant" and was widely referred to as such by Union and Confederate soldiers. The ubiquity of the phrase "to see the elephant" in the 1840's and its connection to combat during the Civil War at least suggest the probability of an older origin to the rhyme, if not lend more credence to the Merrimac theory of origin.

== Rhyme ==
Various versions of the song exist; a common version goes:

Miss Mary Mack, Mack, Mack
All dressed in black, black, black
With silver buttons, buttons, buttons
All down her back, back, back

She asked her mother, mother, mother
For fifty cents, cents, cents
To see the elephants, elephants, elephants
Jump over the fence, fence, fence

They jumped so high, high, high
They reached the sky, sky, sky
And didn't come back, back, back
Till the 4th of July ly ly

Alternate versions use "15 cents", "never came down" and end with repeating "July, July, July".

An alternate version continues:

July can't walk, walk, walk
July can't talk, talk, talk
July can't eat, eat, eat
With a knife and fork, fork, fork

An alternate version, sung in Canada and England, includes the words:

She could not read, read, read
She could not write, write, write
But she could smoke, smoke, smoke
Her father's pipe, pipe, pipe

An alternate version, sung in the American South:

Mary Mack,
Dressed in black,
Silver buttons all down her back.
She combed her hair
And broke the comb
She's gonna get a whoopin' when her mama comes home
Gonna get a whoopin' when her mama comes home

The first three lines above are stated in one source to be a riddle with the answer being "coffin".

== Clap ==
A common version of the accompanying clap is as follows:

- Pat arms across chest: Arms across chest
- Pat thighs: Pat thighs
- Clap hands: Clap hands
- Clap right hands together: Clap right palms with partner
- Clap left hands together: Clap left palms with partner
- Clap both hand together
- Clap both palms with partner

== See also ==
- "DemiRep" – a song from the punk rock band Bikini Kill that includes "Mary Mack"
- "Mary Mack" – a 1986 song from R&B singer Kenneth "Babyface" Edmonds appearing on the album Lovers
- "Figaro" – a song on the 2004 album Madvillainy that references "All black like Miss Mary Mack"
- "Miss Mary Mack" - a song by garage rock band The Rare Occasions, directly based on "Mary Mack"
- "Tobacco Origin Story" – a poem by Joy Harjo, which refers to the song
- "Walking the Dog" – 1963 single by Rufus Thomas with lyrics based on "Mary Mack"
- "Witchcraft" – 1989 single by Book of Love with a reference to "Mary Mack"
