= Down Down Baby =

Nursery rhyme and clapping game

"Down Down Baby" (also known as "Roller Coaster") is a clapping game played by children in English-speaking countries. In the game, two or more children stand in a circle, and clap hands in tune to a rhyming song. It has been used in various songs and media productions since the mid 20th century.

As with most hand-clapping games, there are many variations. Modified versions of the song have appeared in Little Anthony and the Imperials's "Shimmy Shimmy Ko-Ko Bop", Nelly's "Country Grammar", Simian Mobile Disco's "Hotdog", The Damned's "New Rose", The Drums' "Let's Go Surfing", Cayucas' "Jessica WJ", Carter USM's "Watching the Big Apple Turnover", Bella Thorne and Zendaya's "Contagious Love", the film Big, EXO's "Ko Ko Bop", Kyle's "Yes!", and Lana Del Rey's "A&W".
