= Notion (The Rare Occasions song) =

2021 single by the Rare Occasions

Single by the Rare Occasions
- Released: 2021
- Recorded: 2016
- Genre: Alternative rock, indie rock
- Length: 3:15
- Label: Elektra
- Songwriter: Brian McLaughlin
- Producer: Steve Sacco

The Rare Occasions singles chronology
| "Origami" (2021) | "Notion" (2021) | "Seasick" (2022) |

"Notion" is a song by American indie rock band The Rare Occasions, written by lead singer Brian McLaughlin. It was first released independently as part of their Futureproof EP on August 5, 2016. The song went viral on TikTok and YouTube in October 2021, with a slowed version of the song being used in videos portraying nostalgia, also for reaching subscriber goals in which they just passed. The renewed popularity of the song led the band to re-release it as a single.

== Meaning ==
The song is about religion, specifically not believing in it. The opening lines "Sure it's a calming notion, perpetual in motion, but I don't need the comfort of any lies" describe how religious texts calm people, though what it tells might not be true. In his 2016 review of the EP, Futureproof Mitch Mosk of Atwood Magazine wrote that the song makes one consider that "Life has its ups and its downs, but that isn't a reason to not live each day to our fullest potential."

== Reception ==
"Notion" entered the UK Singles Chart for two weeks and peaked at number 72.

== Personnel ==
=== The Rare Occasions ===
- Brian McLaughlin – lead and backing vocals, rhythm guitar, orchestral arrangement
- Peter Stone – (ex) lead guitar
- Jeremy Cohen – bass guitar
- Luke Imbusch – drums, percussion

=== Technical ===
- Maria Rice – mastering
- Steve Sacco – production, mixing, recording
- Mitchell Haeuszer – recording

== Charts ==
=== Weekly charts ===
Weekly chart performance for "Notion"
| Chart (2022) | Peak position |
|---|---|
| Canada (Canadian Hot 100) | 94 |
| Global 200 (Billboard) | 132 |
| Ireland (IRMA) | 73 |
| Portugal (AFP) | 121 |
| UK Singles (Official Charts) | 72 |
| US Bubbling Under Hot 100 Singles (Billboard) | 3 |
| US Hot Rock & Alternative Songs (Billboard) | 11 |

=== Year-end charts ===
Year-end chart performance for "Notion"
| Chart (2022) | Position |
|---|---|
| US Hot Rock & Alternative Songs (Billboard) | 24 |

== Certifications ==
Certifications for "Notion"
| Region | Certification | Certified units/sales |
|---|---|---|
| New Zealand (RMNZ) | Platinum | 30,000^{‡} |
| Poland (ZPAV) | Platinum | 50,000^{‡} |
| United Kingdom (BPI) | Gold | 400,000^{‡} |
| United States (RIAA) | Platinum | 1,000,000^{‡} |
^{‡} Sales+streaming figures based on certification alone.
