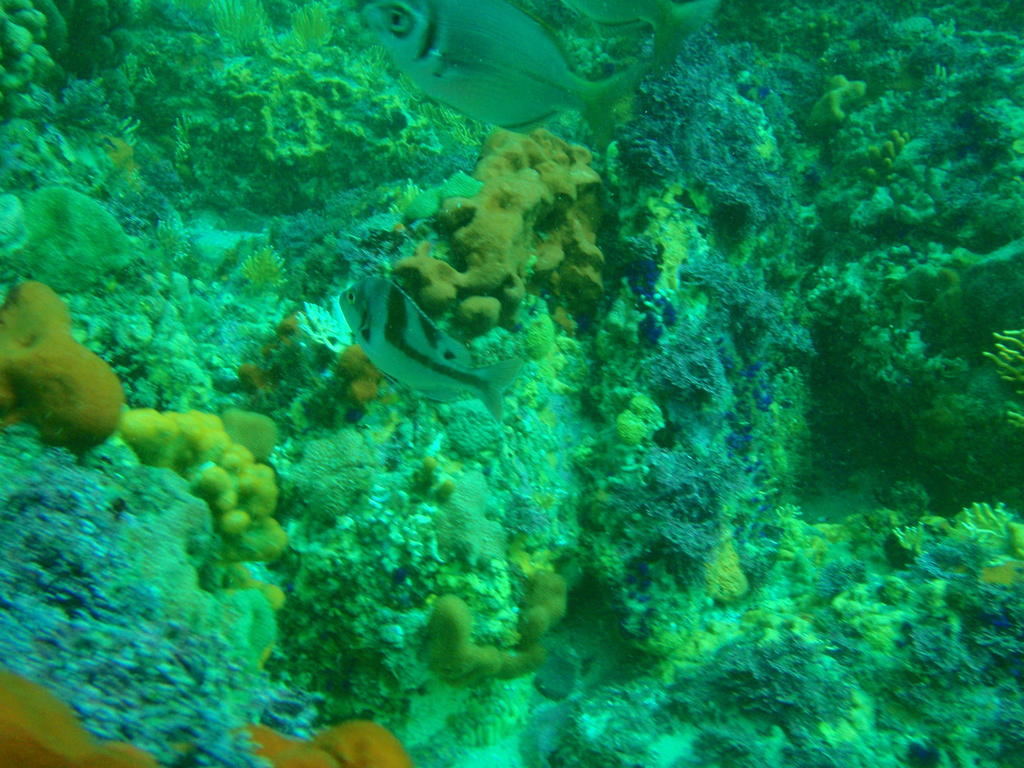

Conservation status
- Critically Endangered (IUCN 3.1)

Scientific classification
- Kingdom: Animalia
- Phylum: Chordata
- Class: Actinopterygii
- Order: Acanthuriformes
- Family: Sparidae
- Genus: Chrysoblephus
- Species: C. cristiceps

Binomial name
- Chrysoblephus cristiceps (Valenciennes, 1830)

Synonyms
- Chrysophrys cristiceps Valenciennes, 1830

= Chrysoblephus cristiceps =

Species of fish

Chrysoblephus cristiceps, the daggerhead seabream or dageraad, is a species of marine ray-finned fish belonging to the family Sparidae, the seabreams and porgies. This fish is endemic to the southwestern Indian Ocean and southeastern Atlantic Ocean off South Africa. This species is assessed as being Critically Endangered bt the International Union for Conservation of Nature.

== Taxonomy ==
Chrysoblephus cristiceps was first formally described as Chrysophrys cristiceps in 1830 by the French Zoologist Achille Valenciennes with its type locality given as the Cape of Good Hope in South Africa. The genus Chrysoblephus is placed in the family Sparidae within the order Spariformes by the 5th edition of Fishes of the World. Some authorities classify this genus in the subfamily Sparinae, but the 5th edition of Fishes of the World does not recognise subfamilies within the Sparidae.

== Etymology ==
Chrysoblephus cristiceps has the specific name cristiceps, which is a combination of crista, meaning "crown", with ceps. which means "head". This is a reference to the heightened nape of adult males.

== Description ==
Chrysoblephus cristiceps has a deep, compressed body which has a depth which fits into its standard length between 2 and 2.3 times. The dorsal fin is supported by 12 spines and 10 soft rays while the anal fin is supported by 3 spines and 8 soft rays. The dorsal profile of the head is concave between the snout and the forehead and is gently humped to the origin of the dorsal fin. The head and body are red, paler on the lower body. The fins are red and the gill cover is orange with an indistinct blue bar under the eye. There is an obvious black spot at the base of the dorsal fin and a dark spot at the base of the pectoral fin. The juveniles are pink with a red horizontal band along the mid flank and two blotches below the dorsal fin. The daggerhead seabream has a maximum published total length of 75 cm (30 in), although 40 cm (16 in) is more typical.

== Distribution and habitat ==
Chrysoblephus cristiceps is endemic to the southwestern Indian Ocean into the southeastern Atlantic Ocean where it has a distribution restricted to the waters off South Africa between Durban, KwaZulu-Natal and False Bay in the Western Cape. Adult daggerhead seabreams are found over offshore rocky reefs at depths between 20 and 100 m (66 and 328 ft) while the juveniles prefer subtidal rocky reefs in 10 to 30 m (33 to 98 ft) depth of water.

== Biology ==
Chrysoblephus cristiceps has been shown by tagging studies to be largely resident as adults, although they will move between reefs. It is a benthic predator feeding on a wide variety of reef associated invertebrates. The daggerhead seabream is a protogynous hermaphrodite with a spawning season that runs from November to January. During periods of cold upwelling, it was found that daggerhead breams moved away from their normal home ranges, thought to be following the warmer waters.

== Conservation ==
Chrysoblephus cristiceps is classified as Critically Endangered by the IUCN. In the past this species was an important quarry for both commercuial and recreational fisheries. As a long-lived, slow growing, late maturing, territorial hermaphrodite this species is vulnerable to overfishing. Stock analyses conducted during 1980 to 1986 found that the stock had collapsed. Later studies have found that the population has not recovered and that stricter conservation measures than those currently in place are required. The marine protected areas within its range, especially Tsitsikamma, De Hoop and MPAs off East London may be important in protecting the stock.
