= Chrysoblephus lophus =

Conservation status
- Least Concern (IUCN 3.1)

Scientific classification
- Kingdom: Animalia
- Phylum: Chordata
- Class: Actinopterygii
- Order: Acanthuriformes
- Family: Sparidae
- Genus: Chrysoblephus
- Species: C. lophus

Binomial name
- Chrysoblephus lophus (Fowler, 1925)

Synonyms
- Sparus lophus Fowler, 1925

Species of fish

Chrysoblephus lophus, the false red stumpnose or the false Englishman, is a species of marine ray-finned fish belonging to the family Sparidae, the seabreams and porgies. This species is endemic to the South African waters of the southwestern Indian Ocean.

== Taxonomy ==
Chrysoblephus lophus was first formally described as Sparus lophus in 1925 by the American zoologist Henry Weed Fowler with its type locality the coast of KwaZulu Natal. The genus Chrysoblephus is placed in the family Sparidae within the order Spariformes by the 5th edition of Fishes of the World. Some authorities classify this genus in the subfamily Sparinae, but the 5th edition of Fishes of the World does not recognise subfamilies within the Sparidae.

== Etymology ==
Chrysoblephus lophus has the specific namelophus which means "crested", an allusion to the high nape in adult males of this species.

== Description ==
Chrysoblephus lophus has its dorsal fin is supported by 11 spines, the 3rd to 5th spines being clearly elongated in comparison to the others, and 10 soft rays. The anal fin contains 3 spines and 9 soft rays. It has a deep and compressed body with a blunt snout and a steep, almost vertical, dorsal profile to the head. It a little bulbous from above the upper lip to the area between the eyes which is bony and corrugated and which becomes rougher as the fish ages. The overall colour of the body is silvery reddish orange marked with between 5 and 8 light coloured vertical bars and with a pale belly. The false red stumpnose has a maximum published total length of 50 cm (20 in), although 35 cm (14 in) is more typical.

== Distribution and habitat ==
Chrysoblephus lophus is endemic to the southwestern Indian Ocean off the coast of Southern Africa. It occurs in South Africa from Sodwana Bay to East London, South Africa, and has been reported off Madagascar. Records from Mozambique remain unconfirmed. It is found at depths between 20 and 150 m (66 and 492 ft) on deeper offshore reefs.

== Biology ==
Chrysoblephus lophus preys on molluscs, crustaceans, echinoderms and smaller fish. Little is known about the reproductive biology but it is thought they may be hermaphroditic and spawning occurs in Spring.
