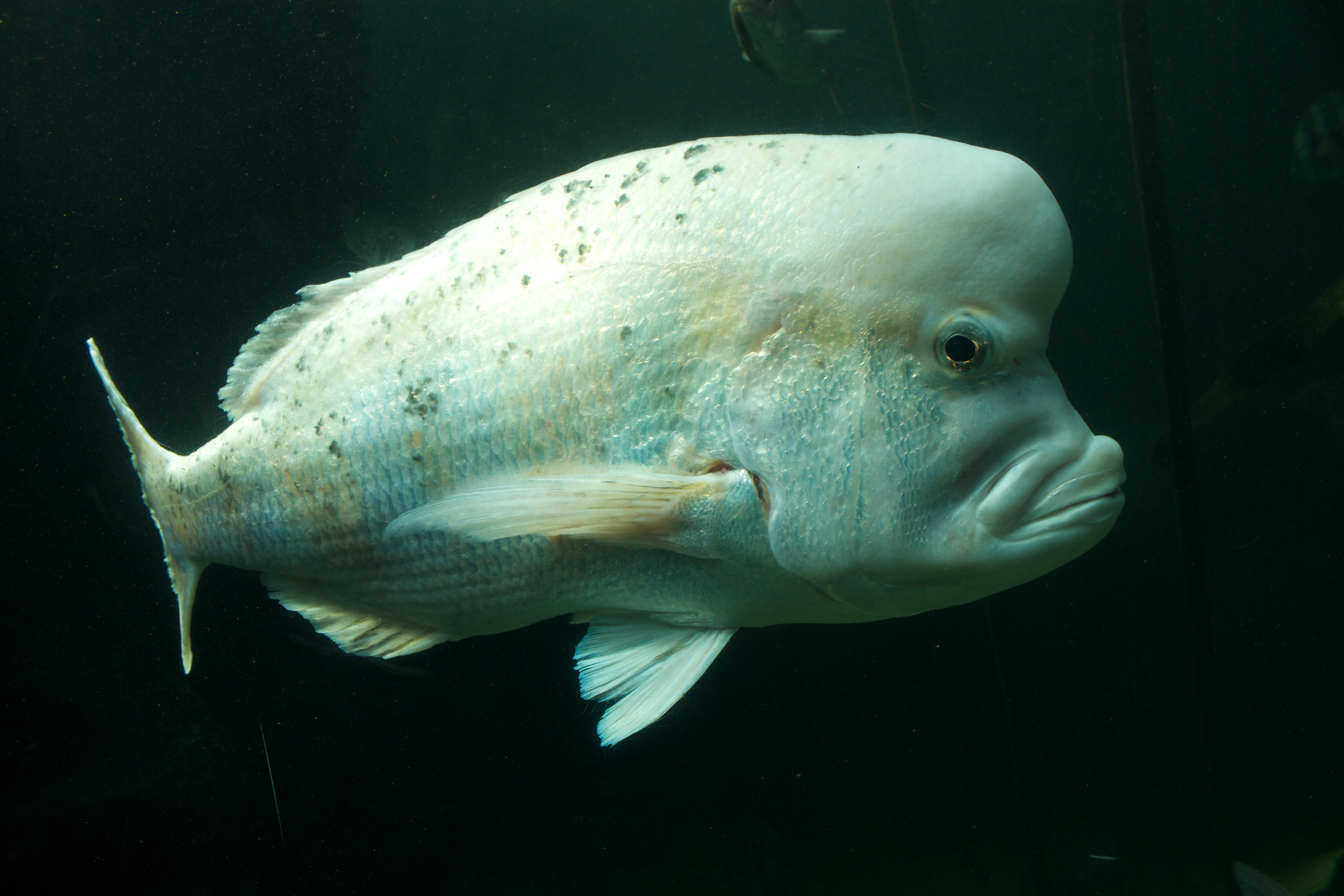
- Chrysoblephus gibbiceps

Scientific classification
- Kingdom: Animalia
- Phylum: Chordata
- Class: Actinopterygii
- Order: Acanthuriformes
- Family: Sparidae
- Genus: Chrysoblephus; Swainson, 1839

Type species
- Chrysophrys gibbiceps Valenciennes, 1830

= Chrysoblephus =

Genus of fish

Chrysoblephus is a genus of marine ray-finned fishes belonging to the family Sparidae, the sea breams and porgies. The fish in this genus are found in the western Indian Ocean and southeastern Atlantic Ocean.

== Taxonomy ==
Chrysoblephus was first proposed, as a subgenus of Chrysophrys, in 1839 by the English naturalist and artist William Swainson. Swainson only classified one species, Chrysophrys gibbiceps, in the new taxon so that species is the type species of Chrysoblephus by monotypy. Chrysophrys gibbericeps was first described in 1830 by Achille Valenciennes with its type locality given as the Cape of Good Hope in South Africa. This genus is placed in the family Sparidae within the order Spariformes by the 5th edition of Fishes of the World. Some authorities classify this genus in the subfamily Sparinae, but the 5th edition of Fishes of the World does not recognise subfamilies within the Sparidae.

== Etymology ==
Chrysoblephus is a compound of chrysos, meaning “gold”, and blepharon, which means “eyelid”. Swainson proposed this taxon as a subgenus of Chrysophrys and repeated the meaning of that name: chrysos compounded with; ophrys, which also means “eyebrow”. This was coined, as Chrysophris, by Georges Cuvier in 1829, stating that it was an ancient name of Chrysophrys auratus, and that it was an allusion to the band of gold that runs between the eyes in a crescent shape.

== Species ==
Chrysoblephus contains the following valid species:

- Chrysoblephus anglicus (Gilchrist & W. W. Thompson 1908) (Englishman seabream)
- Chrysoblephus cristiceps (Valenciennes, 1830) (Daggerhead seabream)
- Chrysoblephus gibbiceps (Valenciennes 1830) (Red stumpnose seabream)
- Chrysoblephus laticeps (Valenciennes 1830) (Roman seabream)
- Chrysoblephus lophus (Fowler, 1925) (False red stumpnose)
- Chrysoblephus puniceus (Gilchrist & W. W. Thompson, 1908) (Slinger seabream)

== Characteristics ==
Chrysoblephus sea breams are characterised by, typically, having scales between the eye, only C. lophus is the exception. They also have scales on the flange of the preoperculum and on the bases of the dorsal and anal fins. Each jaw has 4-6 canine-like teeth at the front and three rows of small molar-like teeth behind those. The overall colour is reddish-orange. The largest species in the genus is the Englishman seabream with a maximum published total length of 100 cm (39 in) while the smallest are the Roman sea bream and the false stumpnose which each have maximum published total lengths of 50 cm (20 in).

== Distribution ==
Chrysoblephus seabreams are endemic to the southwestern Indian Ocean waters off Southern Africa with two species extending into the southeastern Atlantic Ocean as far north as northern Namibia.

== Fisheries ==
Chrysoblephus seabreams are popular fishes to commercial and recreational fishers in South Africa, where they are known as reds.
