= Miss Susie =

American schoolyard rhyme with rude or profane words

"Miss Susie", also known as "Hello Operator", "Miss Suzy", "Miss Lucy", and many other names, (Note: Including Mary, "Oh, it ain't—", "When Lucy had a steamboat", "Lulu had a steamboat", Miss Sophie, and Miss Molly.) is the name of an American schoolyard rhyme in which each verse leads up to a rude word or profanity which is revealed in the next verse as part of an innocuous word or phrase. Originally used as a jump-rope rhyme, it is now more often sung alone or as part of a clapping game. Hand signs sometimes accompany the song, such as pulling on the bell in the first verse or making a phone gesture in the second.

This song is sometimes combined or confused with "Miss Lucy had a baby", which is sung to the same tune and also served as a jump-rope song. That song developed from verses of much older (and cruder) songs which were most commonly known as "Bang Bang Rosie" in Britain, "Bang Away Lulu" in Appalachia, and "My Lula Gal" in the West. The variants including a woman with an alligator purse urging the baby's mother to vote have been seen as a reference to Susan B. Anthony, an American suffragette and wife, and may be responsible for the steamboat owner's most common name today.

== Structure ==
The rhyme is arranged in quatrains, with an ABCB rhyme scheme. The rhyme is organized by its meter, a sprung rhythm in trimeter. Accentual verse (including sprung rhythm) is a common form in English folk verse, including nursery rhymes and jump-rope rhymes. The rhyme approaches taboo words, only to cut them off and modify them with an enjambment. It shares much of the same melody as the 1937 "The Merry-Go-Round Broke Down" used by Warner Bros. as the theme to their Looney Tunes cartoons.

== History ==
The song has developed many variations over an extended period, as is common for such rhymes. Even 21st-century versions, however, typically preserve long-outdated references to the dangerousness of 19th-century steamers and to the need for a switchboard operator to manually connect a telephone call.

The earliest recorded version—about a girl named Mary—appears among the vaudeville jokes collected by Ed Lowry during his career in the 1910s, '20s, and '30s, although versions about Robert Fulton, inventor of the steamboat) and Lulu (the star of "Bang Bang Lulu") may record older traditions. The Lulu tradition—including "Miss Lucy had a baby"—already record enjambed double entendres during the World Wars, but the first version of this song known to have done so—versions about Fulton and a girl named Helen—date to the 1950s.

Later versions developed by embellishment: adding, removing, and adjusting stanzas involving kissing, boys in bathrooms, a little black boy, bras, King Arthur, questions and lies, German spies, raving aunts, and so forth. While the initial stanzas were fairly stable by the late 20th century, the folklorist Josepha Sherman noted that two unrelated children in 1990s New York took the change from "Miss Lucy" to "Ms. Lucy" for granted, the long-lasting rhyme being an example of how such orally transmitted children's songs reflect shifting social mores. An adaptation—"Miss Lucy had some leeches"—has been recorded by Emilie Autumn and another—"Mrs. Landers was a health nut"—featured in the South Park episode "Something You Can Do with Your Finger". "Miss Lucy had a steamboat" was interpolated on "Pattycake", a song by Self from their fourth studio album Gizmodgery (2000).

=== Lyrics ===
Miss Susie had a steamboat,
The steamboat had a bell (DING DING)!
Miss Susie went to heaven,
The steam boat went to—

HELLo operator,
please give me number nine,
And if you disconnect me,
I’ll chop off your—

BEHIND the ‘fridgerator,
There lay a piece of glass,
Miss Susie sat upon it,
And cut her little—

ASk me no more questions,
Tell me no more lies,
The boys are in the bathroom,
Zipping up their—

FLIES are in the meadow,
The bees are in the park,
Miss Susie and her boyfriend are kissing in the,
D-A-R-K
D-A-R-K
DARK! DARK! DARK!

Darker than the ocean,
Darker than the sea!
Darker than the underwear my mother puts on me!

I know I know my ma!
I know I know my Pa!
I know I know my sister with the FORTY ACRE BRA!

My mother is Godzilla,
My Father is King-Kong!
My brother is the stupid one who taught me this DUMB SONG!

== Similar songs ==
The traditional Jamaican kids' song Ten Cents (also known as Sixpence and Ask Me No Questions) dates back to the 1950s. The modern lyrics were written by Pluto Shervington in 1969. It was famously recorded in 1990 by reggae artist Yellowman.

Another song with a similar subject matter is the Assumption Song, commonly known as There Was An Old Farmer. It was first performed in the 1930s by Oscar Brand but is believed to have been derived from an older English folk song. It was regularly performed in the 1970s by comedian Bob Saget and in the early 2000s by comedy music act the Arrogant Worms.

=== Ask Me No Questions ===
I ask me mama for ten cents
To see the new giraffe
With dimples on his body and wrinkles on him
Ask me no questions you will hear no lies
Put down molasses and it won't catch no flies

Me sister owes the rent to a nasty man name Hunt
Him say if you no pay me I want some of your
Country boys, country girls sittin' on a rock
Down come a bumblebee and bite he on him

Cocktail! Ginger ale ten cents a glass
If you no like that you can kiss me hairy
Ask me no questions you will hear no lies
Put down molasses and it won't catch no flies

Two small boys was fightin'
Fightin' in a ditch
One jump on other one and call he a son of a
Bishop have a dog a cute little dog was he
Him lend he to a lady to keep she company

That lickle dog was wikkid
As wikkid as can be
Him jump up on the lady's lap and bite her in she
Country boys, country girls sittin' on a rock
Down come a bumblebee and bite he on him

Cocktail! Ginger ale ten cents a glass
If you no like that you can kiss me hairy
Ask me no questions you will hear no lies
Put down molasses and it won't catch no flies

=== There Was An Old Farmer ===
There was an old farmer who lived by a rock
He sat in the meadow a-shaking his—

Fist at some boys who were down by the creek
Their feet in the water their hands on their—

Marbles and playthings at about half past four
There came a young woman she looked like a—

Pretty young creature she sat on the grass
And she lifted her dress up to show them her—

Ruffles and buckles and fuzzy white duck
She said she was learning a new way to—

Bring up her children so they would not spit
While the boys in the barnyard were shoveling—

Litter and refuse from yesterday's hunt
While the girl in the meadow was rubbing her—

Eyes at the fellas as girls often do
As a sign that she wanted to—

Go for a pleasant stroll down by the docks
With any young man with a sizeable—

House in the country with a porch in the front
If he asked politely she would show him her—

Little white dog that was prone to fits
And let him grab hold of her—

Tender young hands with a movement so quick
Then she would bend over to suck on his—

Candy so tasty made of butterscotch
Then she pulled down her panties to rub on her—

Thigh that she bruised as she ran down the hall
When he tried to force her to lick on his—

Cookies and whipped cream she'd been baking all night
And if you think this song's dirty you're fuckin' well right

== See also ==
- "Bang Bang Lulu"
- "K-I-S-S-I-N-G"
- "Miss Lucy had a baby"
- "Mary Mack"
- "Shaving Cream", a novelty song by Benny Bell
