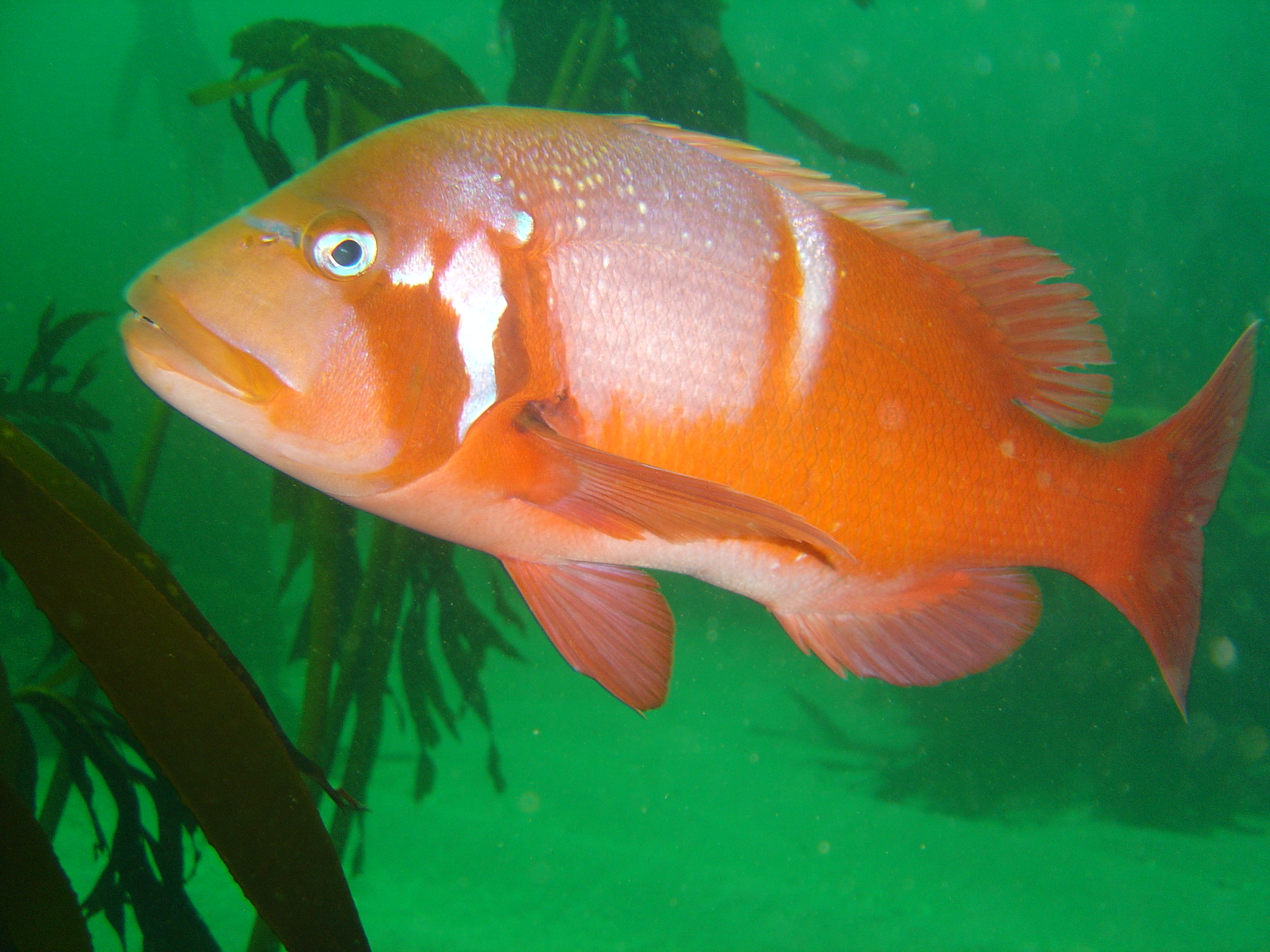
- in False Bay, South Africa

Conservation status
- Least Concern (IUCN 3.1)

Scientific classification
- Kingdom: Animalia
- Phylum: Chordata
- Class: Actinopterygii
- Division: Teleostei
- Order: Acanthuriformes
- Family: Sparidae
- Genus: Chrysoblephus
- Species: C. laticeps

Binomial name
- Chrysoblephus laticeps (Valenciennes, 1830)

Synonyms
- Chrysoblephus algoensis (Castelnau, 1861); Chrysophrys algoensis Castelnau, 1861; Chrysophrys laticeps Valenciennes, 1830; Chrysophrys pugicephalus Gilchrist & W. W. Thompson, 1909

= Chrysoblephus laticeps =

Species of fish endemic to southern Africa

Chrysoblephus laticeps, the red roman or roman seabream, is a species of marine ray-finned fish belonging to the family Sparidae, the seabreams and porgies. This fish is endemic to Southern Africa, ranging from Namibia to the Eastern Cape.

== Description ==
Chrysoblephus laticeps has amore ovate body than other Chrysoblephus sea breams, the depth of the body fitting into its standard length between 2.3 and 2.5 times. The dorsal profile of the head slopes gently from the origin of the dorsal fin to the snout, as the fish ages the area in front of the eyes becomes concave. The area between the eyes is wide and also concave. This is a colourful species with the head, body and fins being vivid orange. There is a blue bar between the eyes and a white saddle-like mark on the back below the 7th to 9th spines in the dorsal fin. The dorsal fin is supported by 11 or 12 spines and 10 or 11 soft rays while the anal fin contains 3 spines and between 7 and 9 soft rays. The roman has a maximum published total length of 50 cm (20 in), although 32 cm (13 in) is more typical.

== Genomics ==
A high-quality scaffold-level genome assembly of Chrysoblephus laticeps was published in 2026 using Oxford Nanopore and Illumina sequencing technologies. The assembled genome size is approximately 758 Mb, with a BUSCO completeness of 99.3%. Genome annotation predicted 39,218 protein-coding genes.

== Taxonomy ==
Chrysoblephus laticeps Was first formally described as Chrysophrys laticeps in 1830 by the French zoologist Achille Valenciennes with its type locality given as the Cape of Good Hope in South Africa. The genus Chrysoblephus is placed in the family Sparidae within the order Spariformes by the 5th edition of Fishes of the World. Some authorities classify this genus in the subfamily Sparinae, but the 5th edition of Fishes of the World does not recognise subfamilies within the Sparidae.

== Etymology ==
Chrysoblephus laticeps has the specific namelaticeps which means "broad head", an allusion to the wide forehead of this species.

== Distribution and habitat ==
Chrysoblephus laticeps is endemic to the waters off Southern Africa in the southeastern Atlantic Ocean and southwestern Indian Ocean from northern Namibia to Durban in KwaZulu-Natal. Records from southern Madagascar and Mauritious are considered to be dubious. It is found at depths between 0 and 100 m (0 and 328 ft) on inshore and offshore reefs with elevated topography in deep water.

== Biology ==
Crysoblephus laticeps is a protogynous hermaphrodite, the mature females transform into territorial males upon further growth. The species forms pairs before an elaborate courtship ritual and spawning, the eggs being released well above the seafloor.

South African research shows that individuals occupy a territory ranging of 1,000–3,000 square metres (11,000–32,000 sq ft), and that the extent is independent of fish size or habitat quality. These small home ranges suggest that dispersal of the species is mainly by planktonic larvae. Activity is markedly reduced during the night, and when cold-water upwelling occur, fish seek the shelter of caves. Over the spawning period, females wander beyond their normal home boundaries.

== Fisheries ==
Crysoblephus laticeps is sought after by line fishers, operating from the shore or from boats within the inshore zone. Linefishing is the least destructive fishing method, having little impact when carried out with rod and reel or a handline. Other methods, such as spearfishing, lead to overfishing and a population decline in areas such as Port Elizabeth and False Bay. Its slow growth renders the species particularly vulnerable. There is evidence of some recovery of numbers within Marine Protected Areas.
