= The Rare Occasions =

American indie rock band from Boston

- Origin: Boston, Massachusetts, US Los Angeles, California, US
- Genres: Indie rock, garage rock
- Years active: 2012–present
- Members: Brian McLaughlin; Jeremy Cohen; Luke Imbusch
- Past members: Peter Stone
- Website: therareoccasions.com

The Rare Occasions are an American indie rock band, formed in Somerville, Massachusetts in 2012. Current members are Brian McLaughlin (vocals, guitar), Jeremy Cohen (bass guitar, backup vocals) and Luke Imbusch (drums, backing vocals). Lead guitarist Peter Stone left in 2018. The band's debut release was the Demo Recordings EP (2012). In 2016, Futureproof was released as a fourth EP. "Notion", a song from the EP, went viral on TikTok in October 2021. Their most recent release has been the album "Through Moonshot Eyes" in September 2024.

== History ==
Everything starts when Brian's mom said:“When you do make it, you’ll appreciate it more because you’ve had that struggle. Those who don’t struggle never appreciate the good that comes because they have no idea what the bad feels like.” Later In high school, McLaughlin and Imbusch joined a band called The Valar in Providence, Rhode Island. The Valar developed 2 EPs and 1 Album throughout its 3-year lifespan. That being "Valagueña", "The Project", and "The Adventures of a Septapus Named Wallace". The group disbanded in 2010 due to each member matriculating at different colleges, deeming it impractical to continue making music for most of the year. McLaughlin and Imbusch left the band, met Stone and Cohen at their respective colleges, and decided to add them to the band. Thus forming The Rare Occasions. McLaughlin came up with the name after the band went through an "identity crisis," eventually settling on "The Rare Occasions" instead of "The Custodians," which they previously went by.

Around late 2015, Imbusch relocated from Boston to Los Angeles, California to pursue his career in music composition, and McLaughlin followed shortly after. Their 2016 EP, Futureproof, was recorded across the US remotely, with Stone and Cohen in Boston and Imbusch and McLaughlin in Los Angeles.

Shortly after Futureproof's release, Cohen and Stone followed the other members to Los Angeles.

Shortly after their first album Into The Shallows was released, lead guitarist Peter Stone left the band amicably, leading to the band becoming a 3-piece. It is theorized that Peter Stone left the band to pursue a solo career, and because he did not want to live in Los Angeles.

Their first release was the Demo Recordings EP, released on October 12, 2012, followed by Applefork (2013), Feelers (2014), and Futureproof (2016). Three studio albums were recorded, Into the Shallows (2018), Big Whoop (2021), and Through Moonshot Eyes (2024). In addition, the EP Attaboy (2022) was released between Big Whoop and Through Moonshot Eyes.

Late into the band's 2024 Through Moonshot Eyes tour, during a show in Dallas, Texas, a crowd member yelled out "Free Palestine" during the song "Strange World". Imbusch responded irately and stormed offstage. For almost a year, the band went completely silent on social media. On October 16, 2025, at an unannounced gig, the band returned with a temporary drummer, Eva Friedman, and mentioned new music.

== Style ==
The Rare Occasions were described as a garage rock, indie rock, and indie pop band. The EP Futureproof introduced experimentation – string arrangements and woodwind instruments, suggested by Imbusch and vocal harmonies. 2021 album Big Whoop featured Wall of Sound guitars, electronic landscapes, and further orchestral arrangements; McLaughlin's lyrics are sometimes philosophical and often deal with existentialism.

== Members ==
=== Current members ===
- Brian McLaughlin – lead vocals, guitars, keyboards (2012–present)
- Jeremy Cohen – bass guitar, guitars, backing vocals (2012–present)
- Luke Imbusch – drums, percussion, backing vocals (2012–present)

=== Past members ===
- Peter Stone – guitars, backing vocals (2012–2018)

== Discography ==
=== Albums ===
- Into the Shallows (2018)
- Big Whoop (2021)
- Through Moonshot Eyes (2024)

=== EPs ===
- Demo Recordings (2012)
- Applefork (2013)
- Feelers (2014)
- Futureproof (2016)
- Attaboy (2022)

=== Singles ===
- "An Actuary Retires" (2015)
- "Aglow" (2015)
- "Mercy Mercy" (2018)
- "You Weren't Meant to See That" (2018)
- "Physics" (2018)
- "Control" (2019)
- "Set It Right" (2020)
- "Alone" (2020)
- "Stay" (2021)
- "Call Me When You Get There" (2021)
- "Origami" (2021)
- "Notion" via Elektra Records (2021)
- "Notion (Acoustic)" (2022)
- "Notion (Cinematic)" (2022)
- "Seasick" (2022)
- "Not Afraid" (2022)
- "Start This Over"(2023)
- "Black Balloons" (2023)
- "Darling, The Planets" (2024)
- "Macaroni Moon" (2024)
- "Mr. Bubbles" (2024)
- “Everything” (2026)
