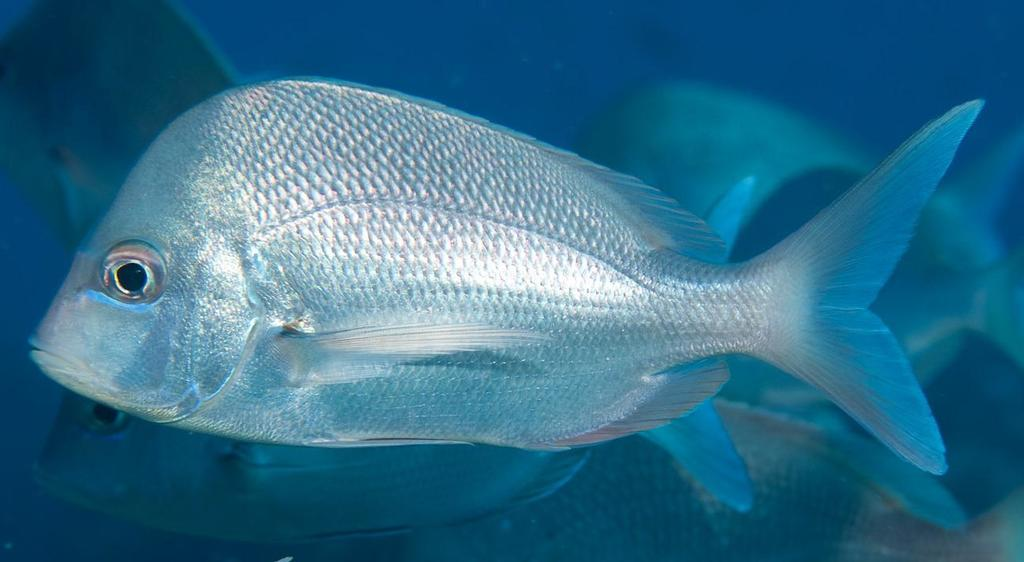

Conservation status
- Least Concern (IUCN 3.1)

Scientific classification
- Kingdom: Animalia
- Phylum: Chordata
- Class: Actinopterygii
- Order: Acanthuriformes
- Family: Sparidae
- Genus: Chrysoblephus
- Species: C. puniceus

Binomial name
- Chrysoblephus puniceus (Gilchrist & W. W. Thompson, 1908)

Synonyms
- Chrysophrys puniceus Gilchrist & Thompson, 1908

= Chrysoblephus puniceus =

Species of fish

Chrysoblephus puniceus, the slinger seabream, is a species of marine ray-finned fish belonging to the family Sparidae, the seabreams and porgies. This species is found in the southwestern Indian Ocean where it is endemic to Southern Africa.

== Taxonomy ==
Chrysoblephus puniceus was first formally described as Chrysophrys puniceus in 1908 by the ichthyologists John Dow Fisher Gilchrist, a Scot, and William Wardlaw Thompson, a South African, with its type locality given as KwaZulu-Natal, South Africa. The genus Chrysoblephus is placed in the family Sparidae within the order Spariformes by the 5th edition of Fishes of the World. Some authorities classify this genus in the subfamily Sparinae, but the 5th edition of Fishes of the World does not recognise subfamilies within the Sparidae.

== Etymology ==
Chrysoblephus puniceus has the specific namepuniceus which means "reddish", an allusion to the pink colour of the body of this fish.

== Description ==
Chrysoblephus puniceus has its dorsal fin supported by 11 spines and 10 soft rays while the anal fin is supported by 3 spines and 8 soft rays. The body is deep and compressed and its depth fits into its standard length around twice. The dorsal profile of the headis very steep between the upper lip to the nape, with a ridge just in front of the dorsal fin. The overall colour of the body is reddish pink with bluish tints, the fins are pink and there is a slender blue bar below the eyes. There is a very small black spot at the origin of the pectoral fin. The fslinger has a maximum published total length of 85 cm (33 in), although 55 cm (22 in) is more typical.

== Distribution and habitat ==
Chrysoblephus puniceus is found in the southwestern Indian Ocean where it occurs from southern Mozambique to Algoa Bay in the Eastern Cape of South Africa, and off southern Madagascar. It is found at deoths between 10 and 130 m (33 and 427 ft) on offshore rockyreefs. Juveniles prefer shallower waters than adults.

== Biology ==
Chrysoblephus puniceus is the only protogynous hermaphrodite in the Natal area, with females becoming male at approximately 5 years or 38 cm. Subsequently, these now-male individuals can often grow to 55 cm in length. In theory, this reproductive system leads to most offspring being fathered by just a few individuals, which would lead to decreased genetic diversity and inbreeding depression. However, comparisons with the ecologically similar (but gonochoric) santer sea bream indicate similar levels of genetic diversity and effective population size over historic timescales.

The slinger is an opportunistic predator which as an adult preys mainly on benthic crustaceans, molluscs and echinoderms while the juveniles prey on small benthic crustaceans such as decapods, amphipods, copepods, and mysids, they also prey on crinoids, brittle stars and sea urchins. Adults are mainly resident but there is evidence that juveniles are migratory, moving northwards from the Eastern Cape to KwaZulu-Natal and southern Mozambique.

== Fisheries ==
Chrysoblephus puniceus is an important commercial species, making up 25-50% of the total commercial catch in KwaZulu-Natal. Because large individuals are targeted by commercial fishing, and the only males are large, there was growing concern that the stock could be wiped out in the early 1990s, and indeed the stock was severely depleted by fishing by the late 1990s, but has since shown a 30% recovery in biomass.
