= A Sailor Went to Sea =

Traditional children's nursery rhyme

"A Sailor Went to Sea" is a traditional children's clapping game, and skipping rhyme. It was initially called "My Father Went to Sea", before becoming more widely known as "A Sailor Went to Sea".

== Origin ==
"My father Went to Sea" originated in Brockley at Mile End sometime in 1967 by an unknown writer. From there, it spread throughout London in the early 1970s to West Norwood and Battersea Brixton. The song was first recorded by Iona Opie in Birmingham in 1972. After the fourth verse, the initial words typically replace "sea/see" with other words, such as "chop", "knee", "bed", "pick", or "toes", with appropriate gestural substitutions. According to the Opies, the title "A Sailor Went to Sea" was a joke that originated or was perpetuated in the song "We Joined the Navy" (aka "We Saw The Sea") from the 1936 movie Follow the Fleet.

== Lyrics ==
A first verse of A Sailor Went To Sea goes as:

A sailor went to sea, sea, sea
To see what he could see, see, see.
But all that he could see, see, see
Was the bottom of the deep blue sea, sea, sea.

While saying "sea", aquatic waves are mimed with the hand; while saying "see", the hand is brought to the eye to mime a "seeing" gesture.

== See also ==
- "Pretty Little Dutch Girl"
