= Pak ganern game =

Pak ganern
- Genres: Hand game with the use of the upper body
- Players: Minimum of 2
- Setup time: None
- Playing time: Instant
- Chance: None to some, depending on the skill level of those playing

Pak Ganern Game is a modern game which has gained popularity in the Philippines. The game was derived from the Filipino clap game "Nanay, Tatay", but in Pak Ganern, players need to say "Pak Ganern" instead of "Nanay, Tatay". When someone makes a mistake, they are punished as the other players agree.

== Background ==
According to anthropologist and professor Felipe Jocano Jr. from the University of the Philippines Diliman in an interview, a phrase like "pak ganern" appeals to the Filipino sense of humor. He said that “Ganern” is from the Tagalog word “ganoón” ("like that") undergoing rhotic harmony, while “pak” is “tumpák” ("correct"), though it may also be an onomatopoeia for an explosion. By combining the two words, a different meaning is formed, with Jocano noting this linguistic manner of humbling one's self using humor is a Filipino cultural trait. He added though there is no inherent or absolute meaning to either "pak" or "ganern", speakers of the language can still instantly create sentence constructions that sound like a winner.

== Growing popularity ==
The game was introduced by host and comedian Vice Ganda in the Philippine noontime variety show, It's Showtime, on the August 17, 2016 episode of the program. Vice, describing the game as "the game that real men are playing," demonstrates the mechanics with the help of fellow It's Showtime hosts Vhong Navarro, Jhong Hilario, and Billy Crawford.

Due to the popularity of the game, Filipino celebrities play along with the game. This includes Bianca Umali, Miguel Tanfelix, Jason Dy, KZ Tandingan, Jay R, Kyla, Daryl Ong, Robi Domingo, Tippy Dos Santos, and It's Showtime's all-male dance group Hashtags.
