= Oscar Brand discography =

Oscar Brand was a Canadian-born American folk singer-songwriter, radio host, and author. He released nearly 100 albums and composed hundreds of songs, among them Canadian patriotic songs, songs of the U.S. Armed Forces, sea shanties, presidential campaign songs over the years, and songs of protest. His discography is extensive.

Since 1945, he continuously hosted the longest-running (70+ years) radio program in history, Folksong Festival on WNYC AM (New York).

== 1940s ==
- Absolute Nonsense (1948, Riverside)
- Back-Room Ballads (1949, Chesterfield Music Shop, Inc)
- Bawdy Songs & Backroom Ballads, Vol. 1 (1949, Audio Fidelity)
- Bawdy Songs & Backroom Ballads, Vol. 2 (1949, Audio Fidelity)
- G.I. American Army Songs (1949, Riverside)

== 1950s ==
- Bawdy Songs & Backroom Ballads, Vol. 3 (1950, Audio Fidelity)
- Bring a Song, Johnny (1950, Children's Record Guild) (reissued by Young People's Records)
- Bawdy Songs & Backroom Ballads, Vol. 4 (1951, Audio Fidelity)
- Bawdy Songs and Backroom Ballads: Volume 5. Bawdy Sea Shanties (1952, Audio Fidelity)
- Courting Songs (1954, Elektra)
- Rollicking Sea Shanties (1954, Audio Fidelity)
- Bawdy Hootenanny (1955, Audio Fidelity)
- Bawdy Songs Goes to College (1955, Audio Fidelity)
- Sing-Along Bawdy Songs & Backroom Ballads (1956, Audio Fidelity)
- The Wild Blue Yonder (1956, Elektra)
- American Drinking Songs (1956, Riverside)
- Bawdy Songs and Backroom Ballads: Volume 6. Bawdy Western Songs. (1957, Audio Fidelity)
- G.I. American Army Songs (with Fred Hellerman) (1957, Riverside)
- Give 'em the Hook! or Songs That Killed Vaudeville (1958, Riverside)

== 1960s ==
- Election Songs of the United States (1960, Smithsonian/Folkways)
- Boating Songs & All That Bilge (1960, Elektra)
- For Doctors Only (1960, Elektra)
- Up in the Air (Songs of the Madcap Airman) (1960, Elektra)
- Sports Car Songs (1960, Elektra)
- Every Inch a Sailor (1960, Elektra) [not to be confused with an album of the same name by Milt Okun]
- Oscar Brand Sings for Adults (1960, ABC Paramount)
- Tell It to the Marines (1960, Elektra)
- Out of the Blue (1961, Elektra)
- World of Folk Music (1961, Armed Forces Radio Network)
- Morality (live 1962, Impulse)
- A Snow Job for Skiers (1963, Elektra)
- Songs Fore Golfers (1963, Elektra)
- Cough! Army Songs out of the Barracks Bag (1963, Elektra)
- Pie in the Sky (1969, Tradition) (reissued by Empire Musicwerks)

== 1970s ==
- Laughing America (1970, Tradition)
- The Americans (1974, Pickwick)
- Best of Oscar Brand (1975, Tradition)
- Oscar Brand: X (1976, Roulette)
- Sing-a-Longs: I Sing, You Sing, We All Sing (1977, Peter Pan)
- Singing Holidays (1978, Caedmon)
- Oscar Brand Celebrates The First Thanksgiving In Story & Song (feat. Eric Brand, 1978, Caedmon)

== 1980s ==
- American Dreamer (1980, Biograph)
- Oscar Brand/Jean Ritchie (1980, Everest)
- Billy The Kid in Song & Story (1981, Caedmon)
- Trick or Treat (1981, Caedmon)
- Singing Is Believing (Songs of the Advent Season) (1982, Caedmon)
- My Christmas Is Best (1983, Caedmon)
- Your Birthday Party (1986, Caedmon)
- Your Birthday Party (1986, Caedmon)
- 100-Proof American Drinking Songs (1987, Caedmon)
- Singalongs: I Sing, You Sing, We All Sing, Vols. 1 & 2 (1988, Peter Pan) (Originally issued as two separate volumes in 1987-88)

== 1990s ==
- Jewish Music in the New World – Live in Concert (1993, Oscar Brand)
- I Love Cats (1994, Alcazar/Alacazam!)
- Get a Dog (1995, Alcazar/Alacazam!)
- Presidential Campaign Songs: 1789–1996 (1999, Smithsonian/Folkways)
- Bawdy Songs Rides Again (1999, Gypsy Hill)

== 2000s ==
- Four Albums of Military Songs from Oscar Brand (2006, Collector's Choice)

== Albums with unknown release dates ==
- The Best of Bawdy Songs (Audio Fidelity)
- The Best of The Worst (Roulette)
- Celebrate (Infinity)
- Children's Concert at Town Hall (concert date May 1961) (Riverside)
- Come to the Party (Young People's)
- Everybody Sing (Young People's)
- A Folk Concert in Town Hall, New York City (Smithsonian/Folkways)
- Folk Festival (compilation, ABC Paramount)
- The First Thanksgiving (Caedmon)
- Happy Birthday (World Songs) (Caedmon)
- Hop, Jump & Sing with Oscar Brand (Miller Brody)
- Macdougal & Bleeker (Elektra)
- Noah's Ark (Young People's)
- On Campus: Concert in Canada (Kapp)
- An Oscar Brand Songbag (Riverside)
- Party at Oscar's Place (video, Peter Pan)
- Paul Bunyan (Caedmon)
- Riddle Me This (Riverside)
- Shivaree (Esoteric)
- Songs & Poems of the Sea (Audio Fidelity)
- Songs for Tadpoles (Miller Brody)
- Songs Inane Only (Riverside)
- Songs of '76 (Miller Brody)
- Town Hall (Folkways)
- We All Sing (Peter Pan)
