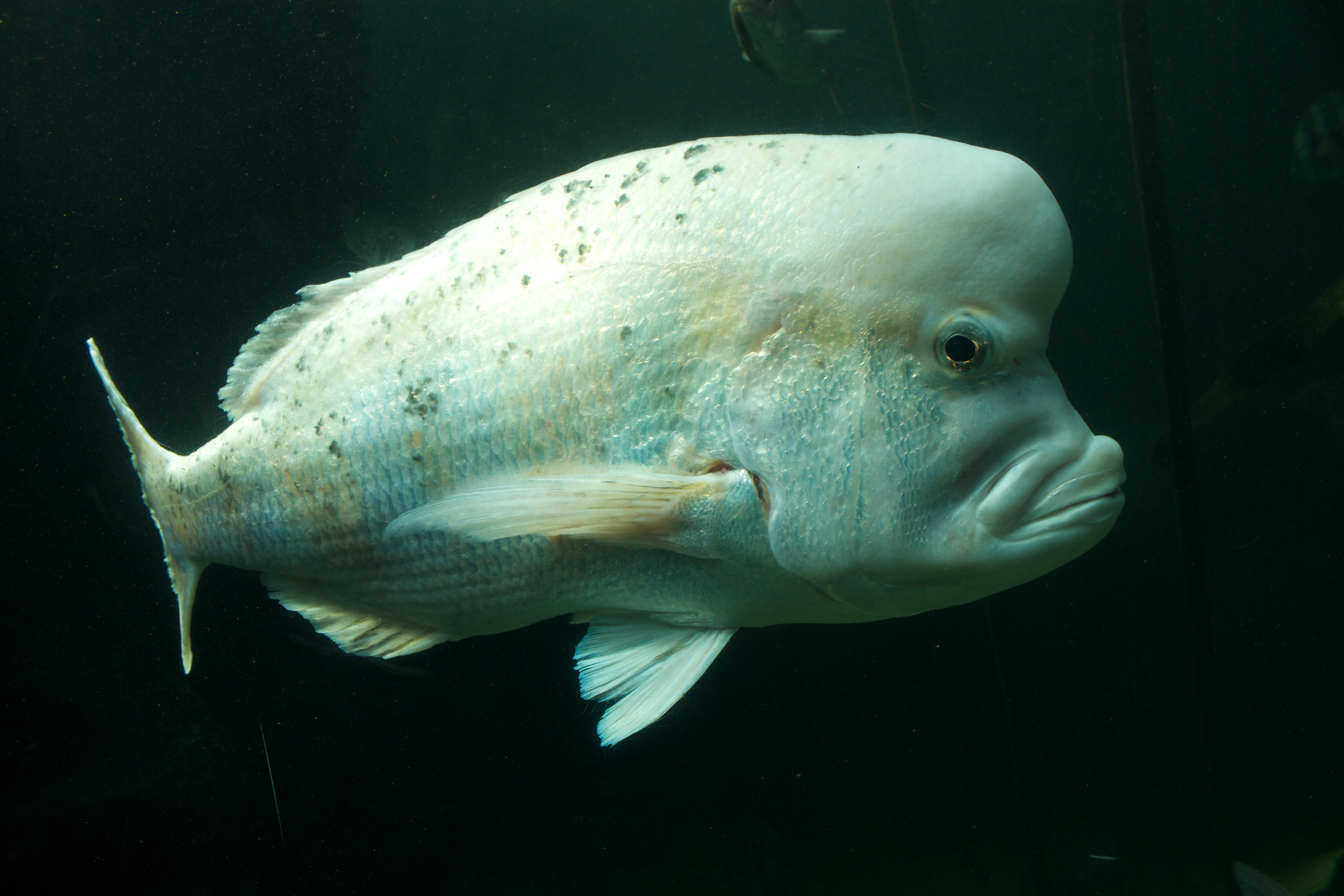

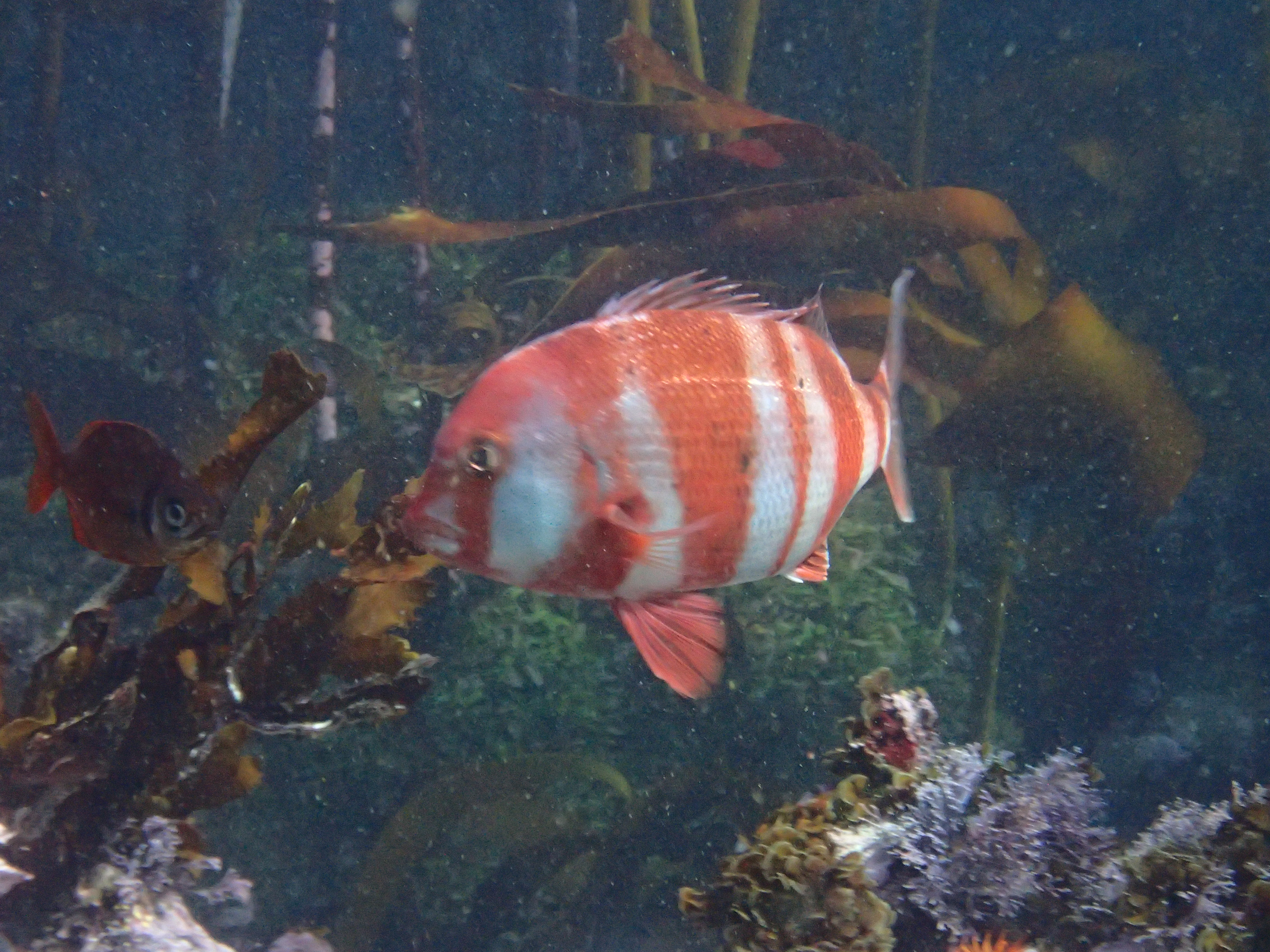
- Old (above), young (below)

Conservation status
- Endangered (IUCN 3.1)

Scientific classification
- Kingdom: Animalia
- Phylum: Chordata
- Class: Actinopterygii
- Order: Acanthuriformes
- Family: Sparidae
- Genus: Chrysoblephus
- Species: C. gibbiceps

Binomial name
- Chrysoblephus gibbiceps (Valenciennes, 1830)

Synonyms
- Chrysophrys gibbiceps Valenciennes, 1830

= Chrysoblephus gibbiceps =

Species of seabream endemic to South Africa

Chrysoblephus gibbiceps, the red stumpnose, red stumpnose seabream or Miss Lucy, is a species of marine ray-finned fish belonging to the family Sparidae, the seabreams and porgies. This fish is endemic to the southwestern Indian Ocean off the coast of South Africa. The International Union for Conservation of Nature classifies this species as Endangered.

== Taxonomy ==
Chrysoblephus gibbiceps was first formally described in 1830 as Chrysophrys gibbiceps by the French zoologist Achille Valenciennes with its type localitygiven as the Cape of Good Hope in South Africa. In 1839 William Swainson classified Valenciennes' C. gibbericeps in a new subgenus of Chrysophrys he called Chrysoblephus and named it as its only species, making this species the type species of Chrysoblephus by monotypy. The genus Chrysoblephus is placed in the family Sparidae within the order Spariformes by the 5th edition of Fishes of the World. Some authorities classify this genus in the subfamily Sparinae, but the 5th edition of Fishes of the World does not recognise subfamilies within the Sparidae.

== Etymology ==
Chrysoblephus gibbiceps has the specific name gibbiceps, which is a combination of gibbus, meaning "hump", with ceps. which means "head". This is a reference to the bulbous forehead in adult males of this species.

== Description ==
Chrysoblephus gibbiceps has a deep and compressed body, its standard length is between 2 and 2.4 times its depth. The dorsal fin is supported by 11 or 12 spines and 10 or 11 soft rays while the anal fin contains 3 spines and between 7 and 9 soft rays. The dorsal profile of the head is very steep between the snout and the nostrils. As they grow, a bulge develops in the area between the eyes and in large adults there is a large hump on the nape, creating a protruding forehead. It has a reddish orange body with golden flecks, slightly lighter in colour ventrally, with between 5 and 7 indistinct vertical red bars and a lot of irregularly shaped dark spots on the upper body. The red stumpnose seabream has a maximum published total length of 75 cm (30 in), although 50 cm (20 in) is more typical.

== Distribution and habitat ==
Chrysoblephus gibbiceps is found in the extreme south eastern Atlantic and the southwestern Indian Ocean off the southern coasts of South Africa between False Bay and East London, with records as far north as Margate, South Africa, although these may be misidentifications of similar species such as C. anglicus. This species occurs in coastal waters at depths between 10 and 100 m (33 and 328 ft). The adults are found on offshore reefs while the juveniles shoal over rocky reefs in shallow water.

== Biology ==
Chrysoblephus gibbiceps, unlike some of its congeners, appears to be gonochoristic, not hermaphroditic. They spawn from October to January, peaking in December at the Agulhas Bank. Males have a very low gonadosomatic index (GSI) of 1.6% and this suggests that they are polygamous and that they compete with other males for access to females. It is a predator on benthic organisms and it has been recorded feeding on crustaceans, molluscs and small fishes, although its main prey are brittle stars. Adults are territorial, but will aggregate to spawn, when they come inshore. The monogenean Anoplodiscus cirrusspiralis is an ectoparasite of this species.

== Fisheries and conservation ==
Chrysoblephus gibbiceps is regarded as a highly palatable food fish. It has been targeted by commercial fisheries on the Agulhas Bank and in False Bay. It is also pursued by recreational anglers. Bag and size limits have been imposed, but the stock has been described as having collapsed due to overfishing. The IUCN classifies this fish as Endangered.
