= Nanay, Tatay =

Traditional Filipino children's game

- Genres: Hand game
- Players: Minimum of 2
- Setup time: None
- Playing time: Varies; depends on how long it can go without someone making a mistake

Nanay, Tatay (transl. Mommy, Daddy) is a Filipino traditional children's game commonly played by children. It was made popular during the early 70s.

== Gameplay ==
The game is played by two or more players while clapping in a certain sequence (clapping the other person's hand with the left hand facing up and right hand facing down, clapping the other person's hand with both hands facing outwards at chest height, clapping your own hands) and chanting.

At the start, the players will say the following Tagalog chant:

Nanay, Tatay, gusto ko’ng tinapay,
Ate, Kuya, gusto ko’ng kapé.
Lahát ng gusto ko ay súsundin niyó;
ang mágkamalì ay pípingutin ko!

Translation:

Mommy, Daddy, I want some bread;
Big sister, Big brother, I want coffee.
You will do everything I want you to;
make a mistake and I will pinch you!

Afterwards, the players will repeat the same clapping sequence with the third clap increasing each turn. The players may count their claps, stay silent, or count incorrectly to confuse the other players.

The first player to clap an incorrect number of times will lose the game. The loser will be "punished" by the other player by getting pinched on the nose or ear, or any other punishment of the winner’s choice. One popular punishment is wiping baby powder on the face of the loser.

== Other versions ==
Throughout the years, children have made other versions of this clapping game involving other hand gestures and chants. In 2016, a new version was introduced on the Philippine noontime variety show, It's Showtime, called "pak ganern". This version added shaking of the hips and became popular online with Filipino celebrities playing their own versions of "pak ganern".

== In popular culture ==
The chant has been used in several songs. It became a lyric for the song "Sasakyan Kita" by Gladys Guevarra (known as Gladys and the Boxers with K). It's also used in the song "Nanay, Tatay" by Gloc-9, Darren Espanto, Anne Curtis and Gary Valenciano. "Nanay, Tatay" is one of 20 songs on Valenciano's album "Awit at Laro", in which all the songs are based on Filipino childhood games. In 2018, songwriter Chud Festejo used the lyrics for his own version of "Nanay, Tatay" to tackle the social realities underprivileged children face. He submitted it to that year's Philpop songwriting competition and he became the grand champion for that year.

A horror film from Viva Films entitled Nanay Tatay starring Aubrey Caraan, Andrea del Rosario, Jeffrey Hidalgo, Elia Ilano, Heart Ryan and Xia Vigor, was released October 30, 2024 at Sine Sindak Film Festival.

== See also ==
- Traditional games in the Philippines
- Pak ganern game
