= El conejo de la suerte =

Spanish singing game

El conejo de la suerte (lit. 'Lucky Rabbit') is a children's singing game, typical for ages 6–8 years.

== Game ==
Children sit in a circle with palms connected and sing the song El conejo de la suerte. The child who starts the game claps the right palm of the person to his left with the right palm and reconnects the circle. The child who was clapped repeats the same action and so on, with the claps traveling along the circle to the left, usually matching the rhythm of the song, until the song ends. The child who was clapped with the last syllable of the song must stand up and kiss (or hug) the player you like the most (as the song suggests). The latter player restarts the next round of the game.

The song lyrics may vary in detail, but generally follows the pattern seen in the example below:

Spanish

El conejo de la suerte
Ha salido esta mañana
A la hora de dormir.
Pum, ya está aquí
Haciendo reverencia
Con cara de vergüenza
Tú besarás a quien
te guste más.

Translation:
English

The lucky rabbit
Went out this morning
During the sleeping time.
Boom! It's here
Bowing
With ashamed face.
You will kiss the boy or girl
That you like best.
