= Thomas Fairbairn (disambiguation) =

Thomas Fairbairn was an art collector.

Thomas Fairbairn may also refer to:

- Thomas McCulloch Fairbairn (1840–1874), Ontario lawyer and political figure
- Thomas McCulloch Fairbairn (inventor), inventor of miniature golf
- Sir Thomas Gordon Fairbairn, 4th Baronet (1854–1931), of the Fairbairn baronets
- T. C. Fairbairn (Thomas Charles Fairbairn, 1874–1978), British theatre impresario

== See also ==
- Fairbairn, a surname
