= M.C. Mini Masters =

M.C. Mini Masters logo

The M.C. Mini Masters is an amateur miniature golf tournament affiliated with the American Mini Golf Alliance (AMA). Founded in 1997, the tournament has been held annually since. It has a format unique to miniature golf tournaments, whether professional or amateur, in that each round of the tournament is played on a different course. Despite this, the entire six-round event is completed in approximately thirteen hours from tee-off to completion, using six different courses in southeast Wisconsin and northeast Illinois. It was founded by Mick Cullen, an amateur miniature golfer who holds the Guinness world record for most holes of miniature golf played in 24 hours, and who was a champion of a season one episode of the ABC game show Holey Moley.

The winner of the M.C. Mini Masters receives the Ugly Jacket.

In 2005, the tournament hosted a professional division for the first time, but due to some turnover in the offices of the USPMGA, the Pro Division did not continue in 2006. The M.C. Mini Masters has made a commitment to remain strictly amateur in the future.

Tournament director Mick Cullen announced in March 2007 that Libertyville, the closing course of the Mini Masters for four of five years from 2002 to 2006, would have to be replaced because the course had been sold to a developer who planned to level it in August 2007 and use it for another purpose. The sale fell through and the course remained intact but closed. (It would eventually rejoin the lineup under new ownership as Aloha Falls.) In April 2008, Cullen announced that Par-King in Lincolnshire, IL would be the closing course for the next installment of the tournament. The final two rounds in 2008 were played at the 36-hole format of Par-King, with round five taking place on the Black Course and the sixth and final round on the Red Course. (The other course that was eliminated from the lineup was Kristof's in Round Lake Beach, Illinois.) Par-King has hosted the final two rounds of the tourney ever since.

Changes continued in 2009 as Congo River in Kenosha, Wisconsin closed and was demolished so an automobile dealership could be built in its place. Congo River had hosted the opening round of the tournament every year since its inception. Their closing left Kenosha's Action Territory as the only course to be included in every installment of the M.C. Mini Masters. Replacing Congo River was Sisolak's West; the course, which had been shuttered since 2004, reopened under new ownership, but was only able to prepare one 18-hole course in time for the tournament. Tom Schweiss won the 2009 installment of the tournament to become only the second competitor to win back-to-back titles. Schweiss's three career titles to that point were also second-most all-time (tied with Matthew Cullen), trailing only Michael Cullen's six. In 2011, tournament founder Mick Cullen stepped down as director, ceding control of the event to Michael and Matthew Cullen. Mick went on to win the 2011 edition of the tournament with a record low total of 236 (34 under par), taking his second Mini Masters title. Mick repeated in 2012 to become just the third back-to-back winner in tournament history.

In 2013, Schweiss took his fourth championship, only to be matched the next year by Mick Cullen, whose 2014 crown gave him three in four years. In 2015, Michael Cullen returned from a two-year retirement to become the oldest Mini Masters champion at 59. His seventh victory came 9 years after his most recent, and was rather improbable. Down by four strokes entering the final round, he tallied four holes-in-one en route to a field-best 36 at the layout, tying Schweiss at 21 under par after 108 holes. For the first time in Mini Masters history, the tournament progressed to sudden death. On the opening hole of the playoff, Schweiss's tee shot went into the water, resulting in a penalty and giving him no opportunity to score better than a three. Michael Cullen proceeded to record a two, ending the sudden-death playoff after just one hole.

In a surprising repeat, the very next year saw the second sudden-death playoff in Mini Masters history. This time, Mick Cullen scored a hole-in-one on the 18th hole of the final round to tie Zach Reichert, who had a two-stroke lead coming into that 108th hole of the day. They proceeded to the same sudden-death playoff hole used the previous year, where Reichert won the coin flip and elected to putt first. He hit his tee shot into a water hazard and Mick Cullen proceeded to sink his first putt for a hole-in-one, winning the tournament in dramatic fashion for his fifth Mini Masters crown, trailing only his father Michael's total of seven.

The 2017 M.C. Mini Masters saw the crown return to Tom Schweiss, who took a one-stroke lead into the sixth round. Mick Cullen pulled into a tie with 14 holes to go before Schweiss steadily opened and expanded a lead, eventually winning by a comfortable margin of six strokes to tie Mick with five Ugly Jackets. Schweiss surpassed Mick in 2018 with his sixth championship, putting him one behind Michael Cullen for the all-time record, and went on to tie the all-time record with his seventh championship in 2019. He went on to break the record with an eighth victory in 2022.

== M.C. Mini Masters champions ==
- 1997: Michael Cullen
- 1998: Michael Cullen
- 1999: Michael Cullen
- 2000: Michael Cullen
- 2001: Matthew Cullen
- 2002: Mick Cullen
- 2003: Tom Schweiss
- 2004: Michael Cullen
- 2005 (Amateur Division): R.J. Dusak
- 2005 (Pro Division): Gary Shiff
- 2006: Michael Cullen
- 2007: Matthew Cullen
- 2008: Tom Schweiss
- 2009: Tom Schweiss
- 2010: Matthew Cullen
- 2011: Mick Cullen
- 2012: Mick Cullen
- 2013: Tom Schweiss
- 2014: Mick Cullen
- 2015: Michael Cullen
- 2016: Mick Cullen
- 2017: Tom Schweiss
- 2018: Tom Schweiss
- 2019: Tom Schweiss
- 2020: canceled due to COVID-19 pandemic
- 2021: Jason Gola
- 2022: Tom Schweiss
- 2023: Mick Cullen
- 2024: Bryan Akers
- 2025: Derek Hartmann

== Currently used courses ==
- Action Territory's Wisconsin Adventure and Wild West courses (2015–present)
- Congo River Hoffman Estates (both courses) (2013–2014)
- Kristof's (1997–2001, 2004–2007)
- Par King (both the Black and Red Courses) (2008–present)

== Previously used courses ==
- Action Territory's Lost Falls course (1997–2012)
- Aloha Falls (2002-2007 [as Libertyville Sports Complex], 2012–2019)
- Sisolak's Golfarama (West Course 1997–2003, 2009–2012; East Course 1997–2003)
- Ballybunion (2004–2005)
- Lighthouse (1997–2004, 2006–present)
- Rocky's Fun House in Gurnee, IL, formerly known as Monster Golf or People's Choice (2005–2008)
- Rocky's Fun House in Waukegan, IL (2009)
- Congo River (1997–2008, 2013–2014)
