= Putt-Putt Fun Center =

Chain of family entertainment centers and miniature golf courses

Putt-Putt, LLC
- Industry: Miniature golf, family entertainment centers
- Founded: 1954; 71 years ago in Fayetteville, North Carolina, United States
- Founder: Don Clayton
- Fate: Franchise
- Headquarters: Chapel Hill, North Carolina, United States
- Website: puttputt.com

Putt-Putt, LLC (founded in 1954 as Putt-Putt Golf Courses of America, Inc.) is an American franchiser of Par 2 miniature golf businesses in several states as well as locations abroad. The franchise was originally branded as Putt-Putt Golf, but with franchise expansion into family entertainment centers, many locations are currently branded as Putt-Putt Fun Centers.

== Concept ==
In reaction to low-quality miniature golf courses then available, founder Don Clayton introduced a branded, "no-frills, all-skills" miniature golf concept: Standardized holes are constructed of smooth concrete covered with short nap outdoor carpet and bordered by 2x4" extruded aluminum barriers. Every hole is designed to be par-2, but with hole-in-one always possible with skilled putting. The franchise offers over 100 standard, copyrighted hole designs.

With the focus on consistent holes and skilled play, Clayton formed the Professional Putters Association, which only competes on franchise courses.

The original white and orange facilities were intentionally spartan; no landscaping other than grass and welded pipe fencing and no building other than the kiosk. However, beginning in 1986, animal statuary and other landscaping features began to be included in the franchise, but only as a decorative motif, and never a part of any of the copyrighted holes.

In the 1990s, the chain expanded its franchising options to include broader family entertainment features, including game-rooms, bumper boats, batting cages, and raceways.

== Miniature golf vs. Putt-Putt ==
There are several significant differences between Putt-Putt's brand of miniature golf and other versions:

- Par is set at 2 without exception on each Putt-Putt hole and is so marked on franchise bumper endcaps; in other varieties of mini-golf, par can vary from 2 to 6.
- Putt-Putt's short holes are designed so that a hole-in-one can be scored on each hole with a skillful putt, often through the use of banking; the (copyrighted) metal rails facilitate accurate caroms. Most mini-golf courses include holes that are impossible to ace, and those that can be aced often rely on luck due to extremely long holes and randomly placed obstacles. Additionally, the borders of each hole usually are made of rocks or uneven brick, making accurate banking difficult.
- When playing Putt-Putt, a player finishes a hole before the next player takes his first putt. In miniature golf, typically, each player takes his first putt, then the player farthest from the hole takes his second putt, as in real golf.
- Traditionally, Putt-Putt Golf Courses have no over-riding "theme" and have a spartan look about them. Many traditional miniature golf courses have themes (such as a story book or a religious theme), while more modern mini-golf courses twist in and around man-made mountains, lakes, caves and waterfalls, with the resulting water and elevation changes often in play. Recently, themes such as jungles and volcanos have been making their way to Putt-Putt Golf Courses, complete with caves, foliage and plaster animals, though the themes never come into play.
- Obstacles in Putt-Putt are limited to small hills, metal blockers, pipes, and rarely, small water hazards. Mini-golf obstacles know no limits, including boulders, windmills and other moving obstacles, bridges, ramps and loops.
- Putt-Putt Golf Courses reward holes-in-one with a ticket that typically allows the player a free game if he collects three, or in some cases a scratch-off game card. In addition, the player's ball (red, green, blue or yellow) is traded in for an orange ball, which prevents the player from claiming an additional ticket for that round. Some courses use a set of lights to allow the winning of tickets only for two colors of ball at a time, and announce the names of the golfers who score winning holes-in-one.
- Generally, Putt-Putt Golf Courses are considered more appropriate for competition; miniature golf tournaments occur at Putt-Putt Golf Courses, but are rare at other courses, due to the difference in skill level required. The rare ESPN-televised miniature golf tourney is always at a Putt-Putt course.

== Gallery ==
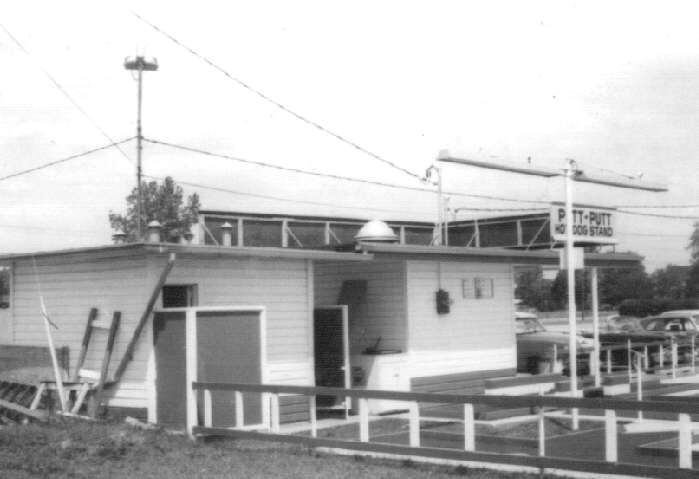
Putt Putt Golf Course, 1965, Toledo, Ohio

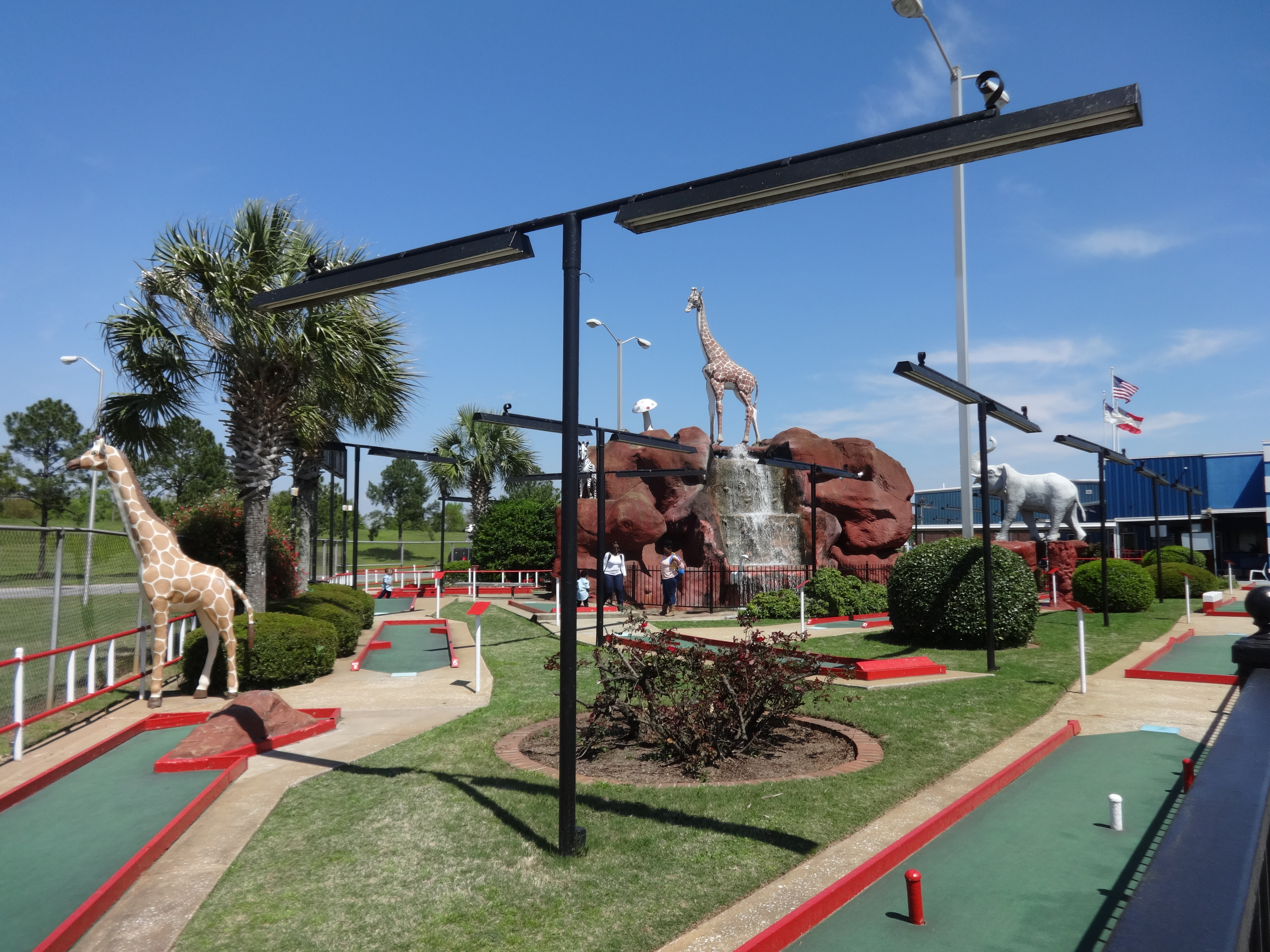
Putt-Putt franchised holes, lighting, and 80s statuary (now All American Fun Park), Albany, Georgia

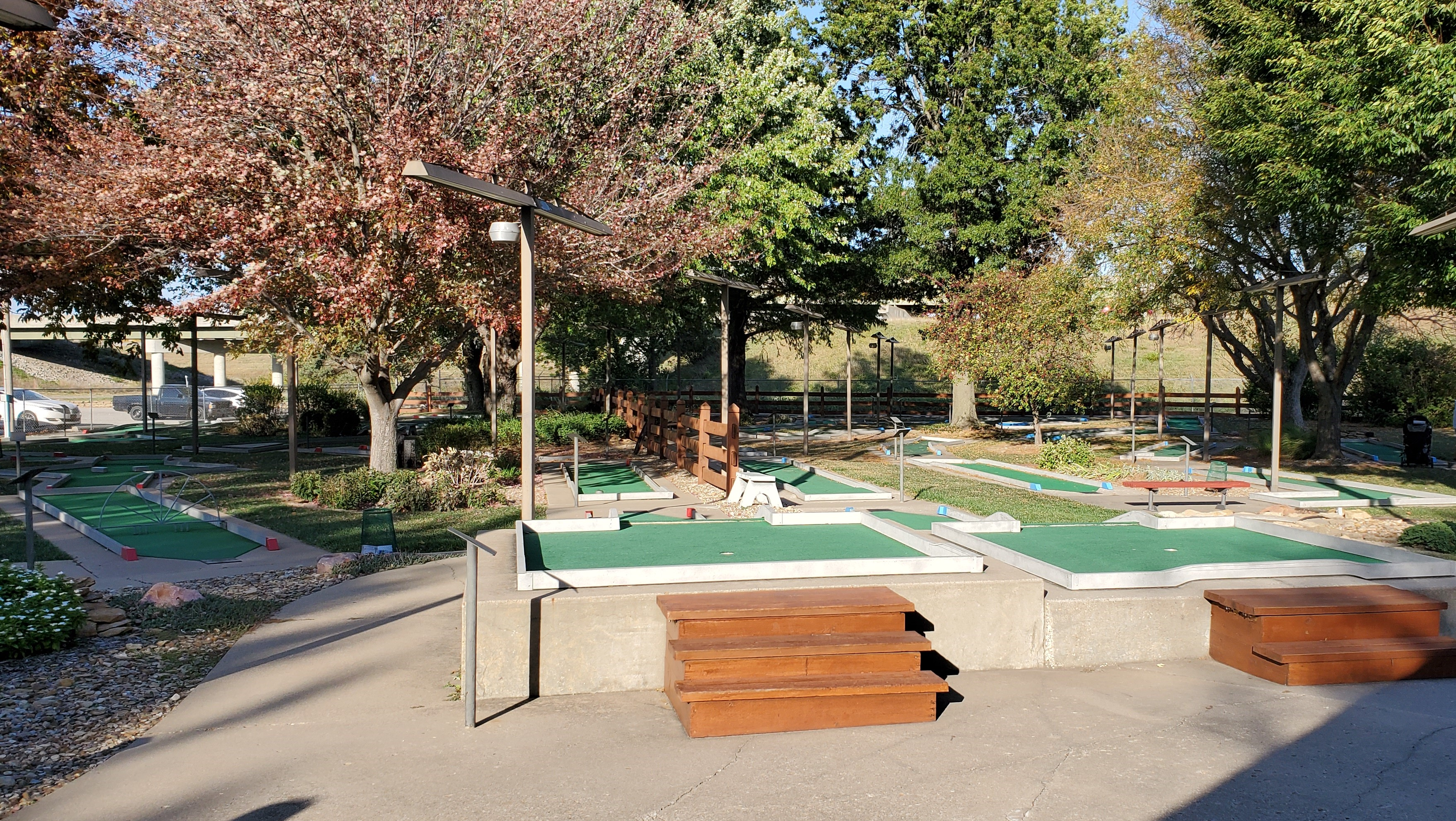
36-hole, ex-Putt-Putt "Putter Golf" in Topeka, Kansas

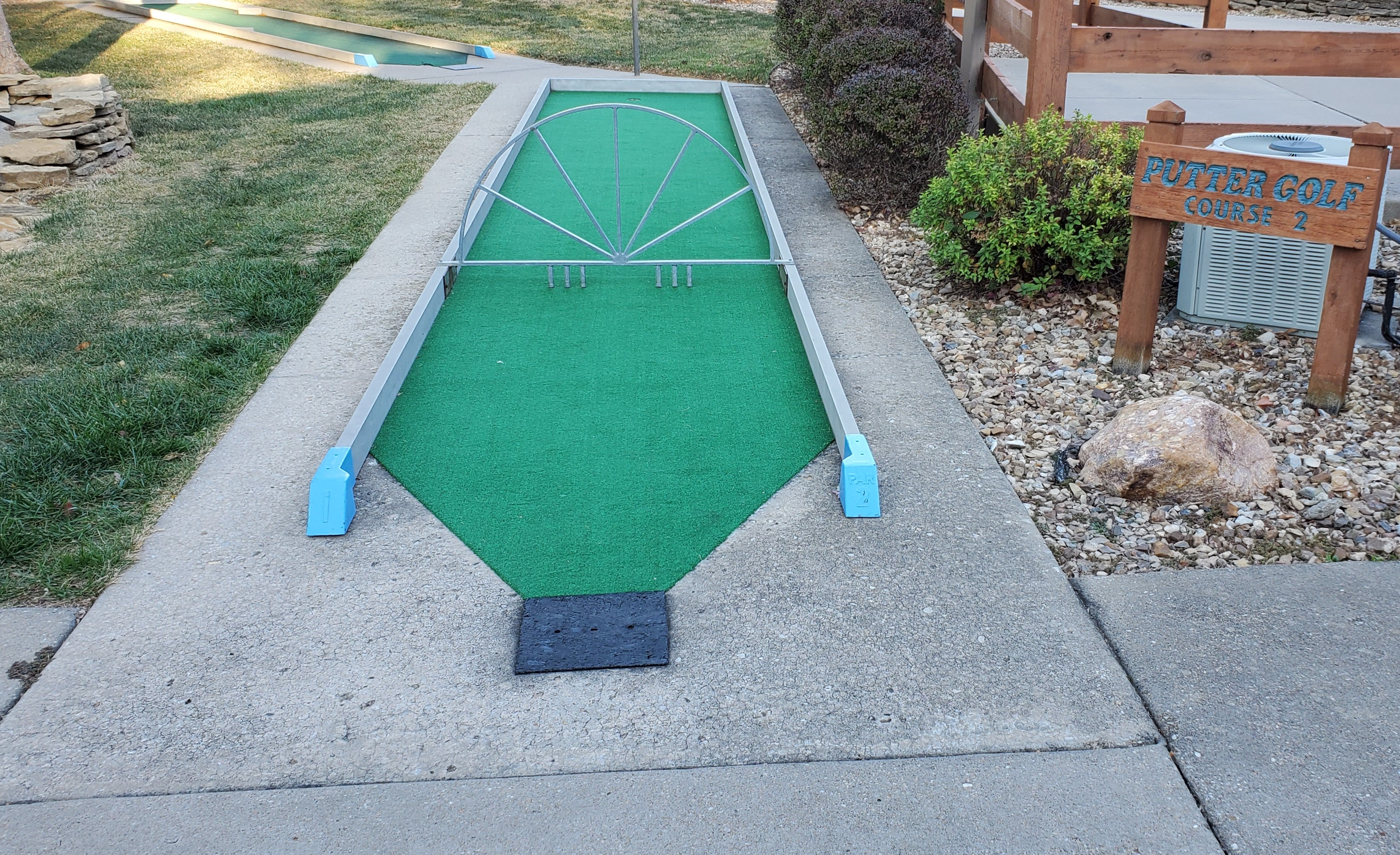
Hole 1 "Putter Golf" replacement of branded Putt-Putt Hole 1 gate

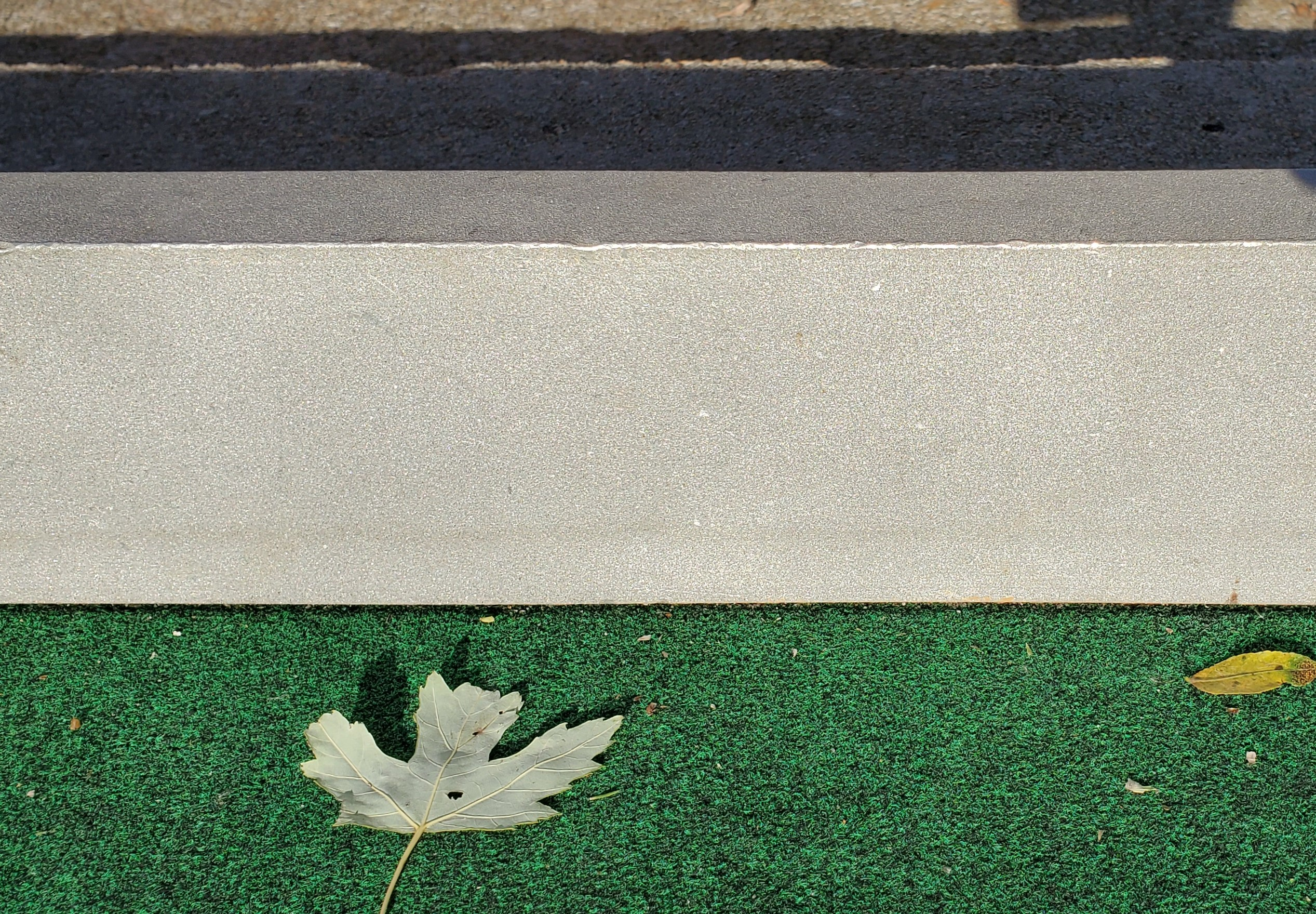
Aluminum 2x4 bumpers, sand blasted to remove Putt-Putt's orange paint scheme

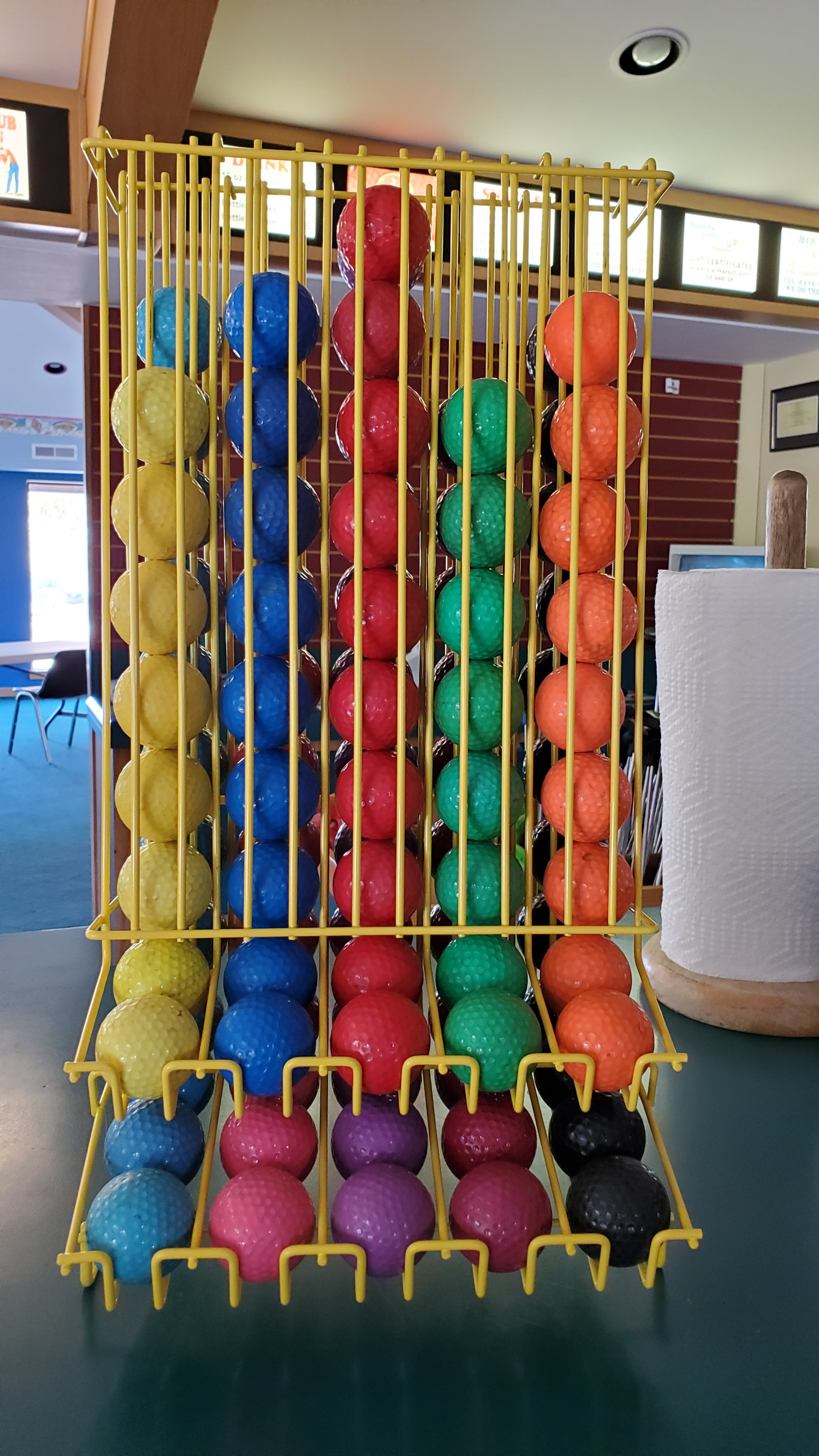
Ball color selection, original 5 Putt-Putt colors on top row.

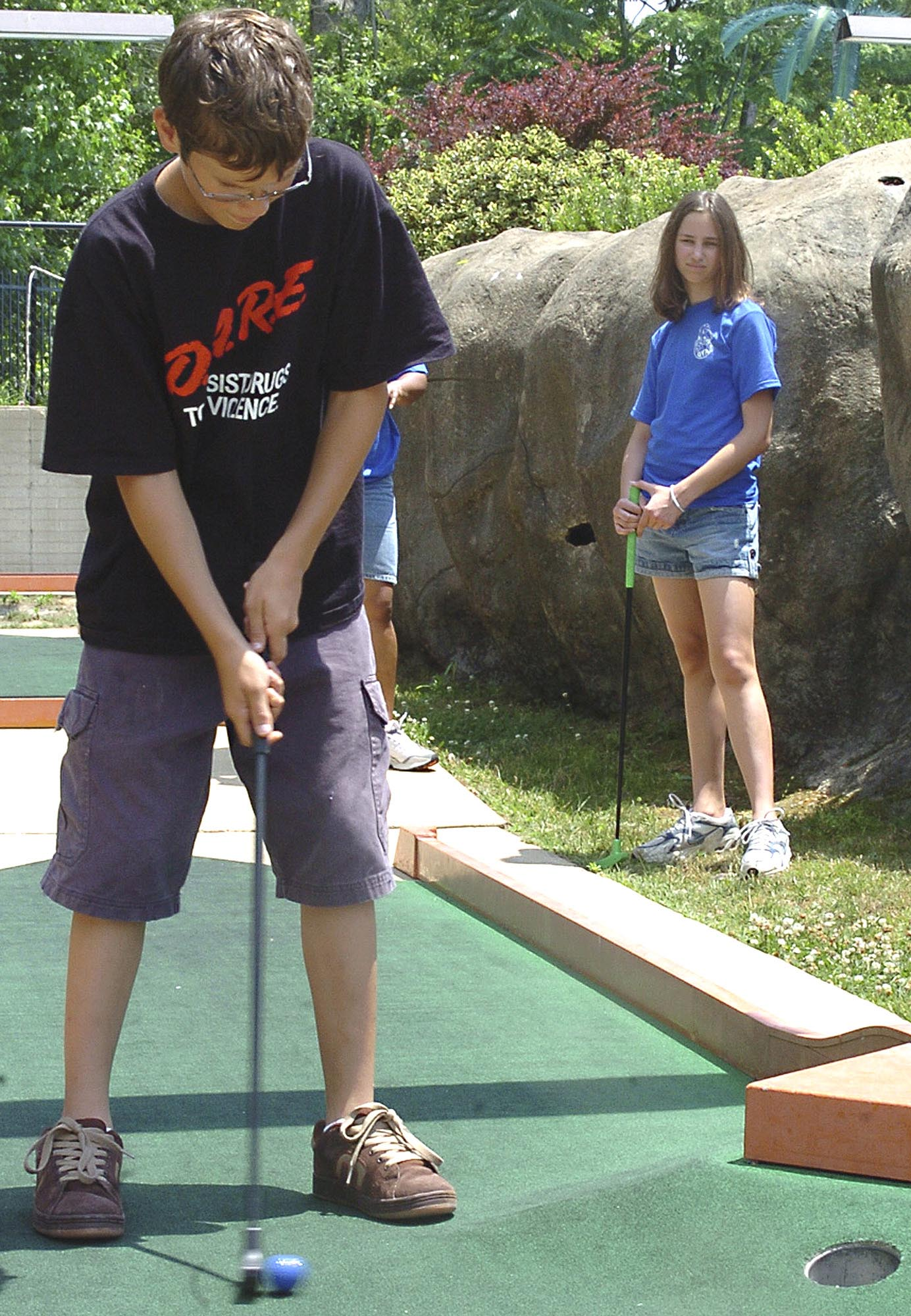
A Putt-Putt hole design, Putt-Putt Fun Center, Fredericksburg, Va

== See also ==
- Professional Putters Association
- Miniature golf
