= Miniature golf =

Offshoot of golf focusing solely on the putting aspect

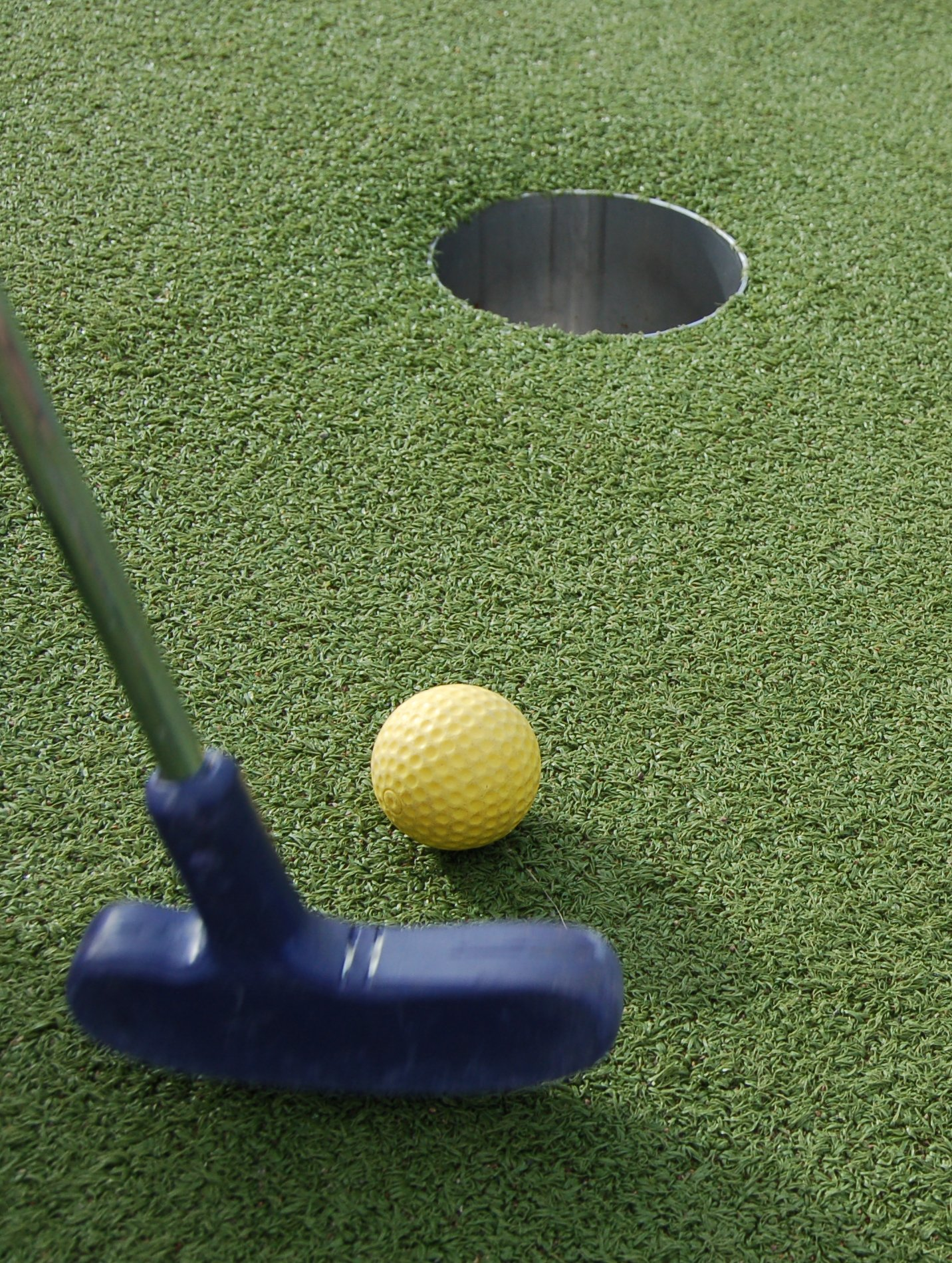
- Highest governing body: World Minigolf Sport Federation
- First played: c. 1912

Characteristics
- Contact: No
- Mixed-sex: No, except mixed multiples
- Type: Club sport
- Equipment: putter, ball, artificial course

Presence
- Olympic: No
- World Games: 1989 (invitational)

Miniature golf (also known as minigolf, putt-putt, crazy golf, and by several other names) is an offshoot of the sport of golf focusing solely on the putting aspect of its parent game. The aim of the game is to score the lowest number of points. It is played on courses consisting of a series of holes (usually a multiple of 9) similar to those of its parent, but the holes are short (usually less than 10 metres from tee to cup).

The game uses artificial putting surfaces (such as carpet, artificial turf, or concrete), a geometric layout often requiring non-traditional putting lines such as bank shots, and artificial obstacles such as tunnels, tubes, ramps, moving obstacles like windmills, and walls made of concrete, metal, or fiberglass. When miniature golf retains many of these characteristics but without the use of any props or obstacles, it is purely a mini version of its parent game.

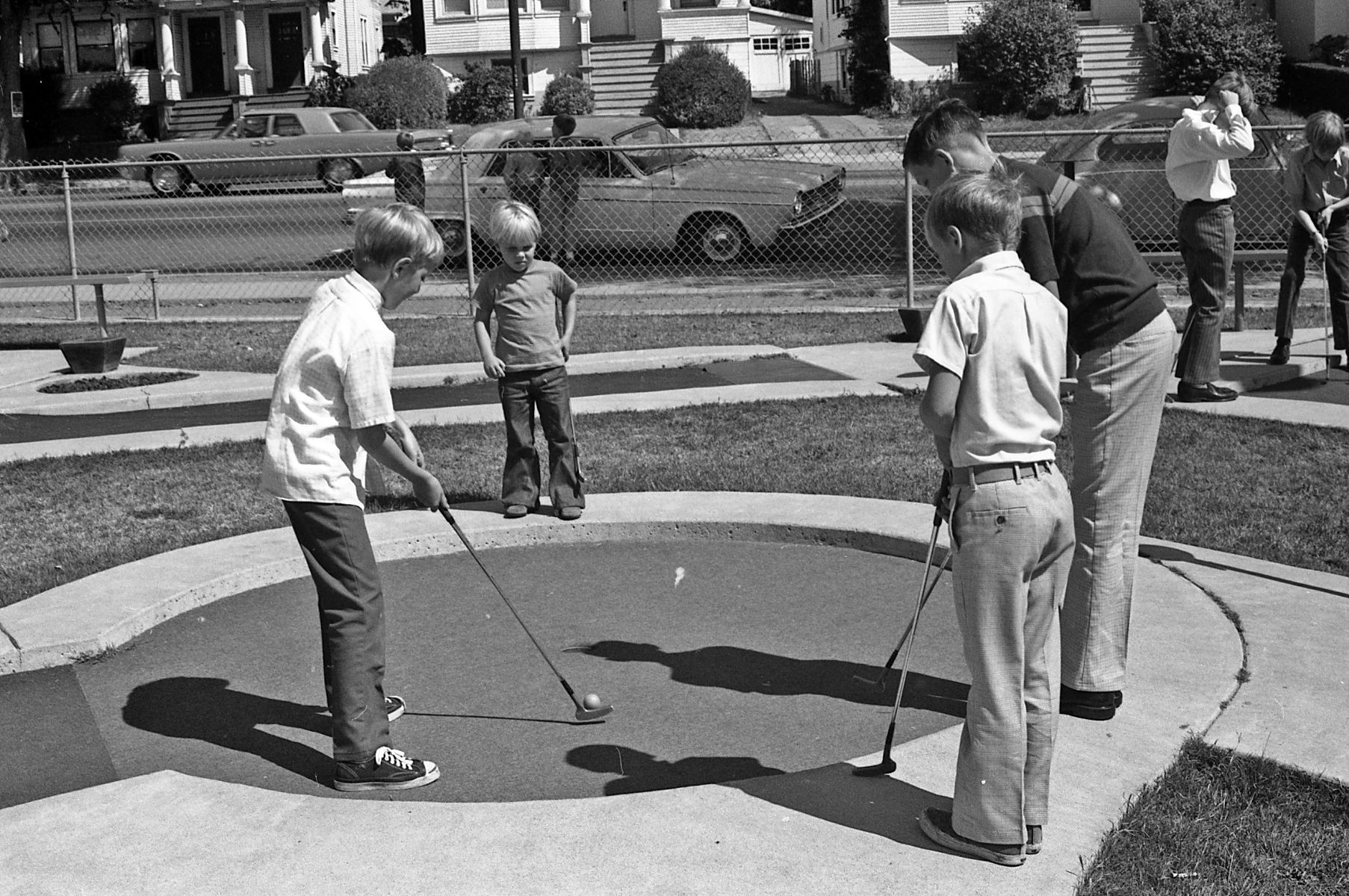
Boys playing miniature golf in Alameda County, California, 1963

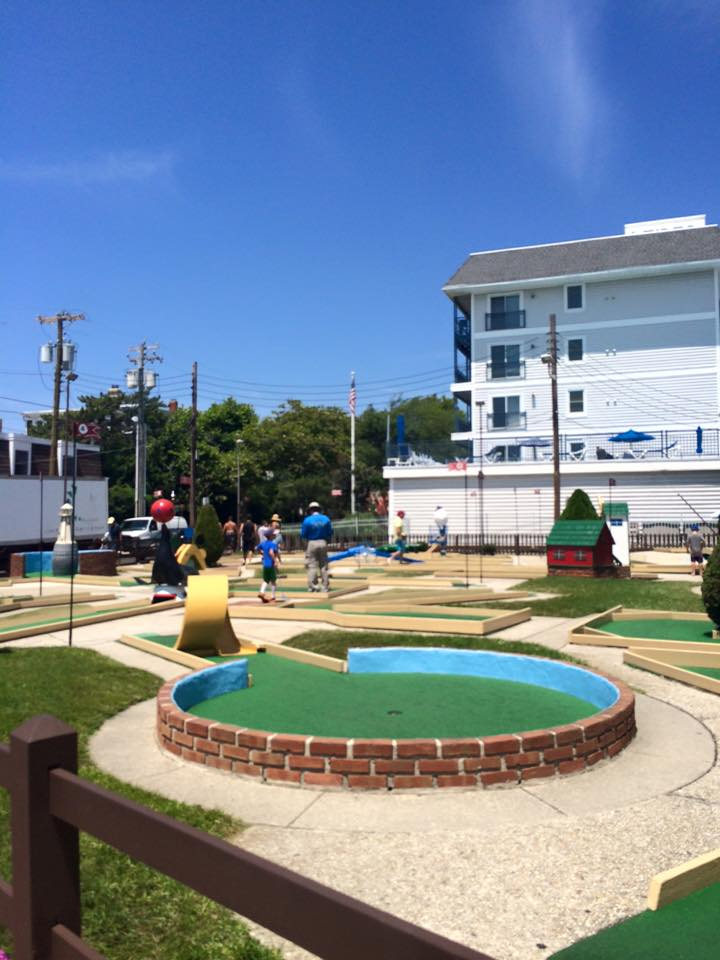
A miniature golf course in Cape May, New Jersey

== Nomenclature ==
While the World Minigolf Sport Federation (WMF) prefers to use the name minigolf, the game has several other names which vary between countries, including mini-golf, midget golf, goofy golf, shorties, extreme golf, crazy golf, adventure golf, mini-putt, and putter golf. The name Putt-Putt is the trademark of an American company that builds and franchises miniature golf courses in addition to other family-oriented entertainment. The term putt-putt is sometimes used colloquially to refer to the game itself. The term minigolf was formerly a registered trademark of a Swedish company that built its own patented type of minigolf courses.

== History ==
Geometrically shaped minigolf courses made of artificial materials (carpet) began to emerge during the early 20th century. The earliest documented mention of such a course is in the June 8, 1912, edition of The Illustrated London News, which introduces a minigolf course called the Gofstacle.

The first standardized minigolf courses to enter commercial mass-production were the Thistle Dhu ("This'll Do") course in 1916 in Pinehurst, North Carolina, and the 1927 Tom Thumb patent of Garnet Carter from Lookout Mountain, Tennessee. Thomas McCullough Fairbairn, a golf fanatic, revolutionized the game in 1922 with his formulation of a suitable artificial green—a mixture of cottonseed hulls, sand, oil, and dye. With this discovery, miniature golf became accessible everywhere; by the late 1920s, there were over 150 rooftop courses in New York City alone and tens of thousands across the United States. This American minigolf boom of early 20th century came to an end during the Great Depression in the late 1930s. Nearly all minigolf courses in the United States were closed and demolished before the end of the 1930s. A rare surviving example from this period is the Parkside Whispering Pines Miniature Golf Course located near Rochester, New York, and listed on the National Register of Historic Places in 2002.

The first miniature golf course in Canada was at the Maples Inn in Pointe-Claire, Quebec. The "Mapes" was constructed as a summer home in the 1890s but was renovated into a club in 1902, opened to the public in 1914, and had a miniature golf course in 1930. The popular nightspot burned in 1985.

=== European origins ===
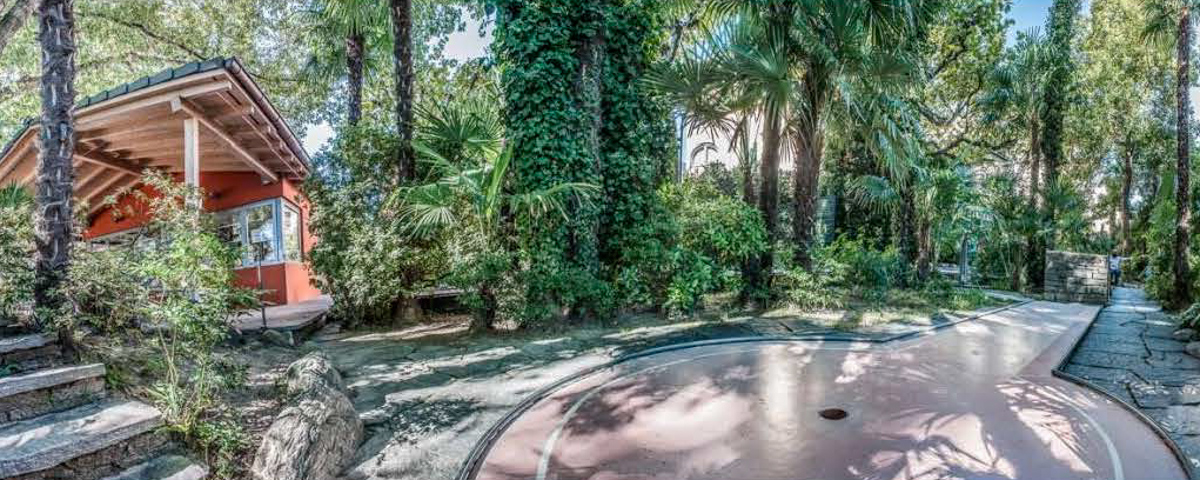
Minigolf Ascona, opened in 1954

One of the first documented minigolf courses in mainland Europe was built in 1926 by a man surnamed Schröder in Hamburg, Germany. Schröder had been inspired by his visit to the United States, where he had seen minigolf courses spreading across the country.

In 1930, Edwin O. Norrman and Eskil Norman returned to Sweden from the United States, where they had stayed for several years and witnessed the golden days of the American minigolf boom. In 1931, they founded the company "Norman och Norrmans Miniatyrgolf" and began manufacturing standardized minigolf courses for the Swedish market. During the following years, they spread this new leisure activity across Sweden, by installing minigolf courses in public parks and other suitable locations.

Swedish minigolf courses typically had a rectangular wooden frame surrounding the playing area made of tennis field sand; in contrast, American manufacturers used newly developed and patented felt as the surface of their minigolf courses. Felt did not become popular as a surface material in Sweden until in the mid-1960s—but since then it has become practically the only surface material used in Scandinavia and the United Kingdom, due to its favorable playing qualities in wet weather. Minigolf courses with a felt surface can be played in rainy weather, because water soaks through the felt into the ground. The other commonly used surface materials, concrete and fibre-cement, cannot be used in rainy weather, because the rainwater pools on them, stopping the ball from rolling.

The Swedish Minigolf Federation (Svenska Bangolfförbundet) was founded in 1937, making it the oldest minigolf sport organization in the world. National Swedish championships in minigolf have been played yearly since 1939. In other countries minigolf sport federations were not founded until the late 1950s, due to the post-war economical depression.

In 1951, the course Sandvig Minigolf in Bornholm, Denmark was built, making it the oldest course in the world. 3 years later, in 1954, the minigolf course in Ascona, Switzerland, opened. It is the second oldest course in the world which follows the norms of Paul Bongni.

=== Competitive games ===
The earliest documented minigolf competitions were played in the United States. The first National Tom Thumb Open minigolf tournament was arranged in 1930, with a total cash purse $10,000 (the top prize being $2,000). Qualification play-offs were played in all of the 48 states, and the final competition on Lookout Mountain, Chattanooga, Tennessee, attracted over 200 players representing 30 states. After the Depression 10 years later, minigolf died out as a competition sport in America, and has begun to recover only during the most recent decades. The American minigolf sport boom of the 1930s inspired many European countries, and the sport of minigolf lived on in Europe even after the American game fell into Depression.

=== Post-depression U.S. ===
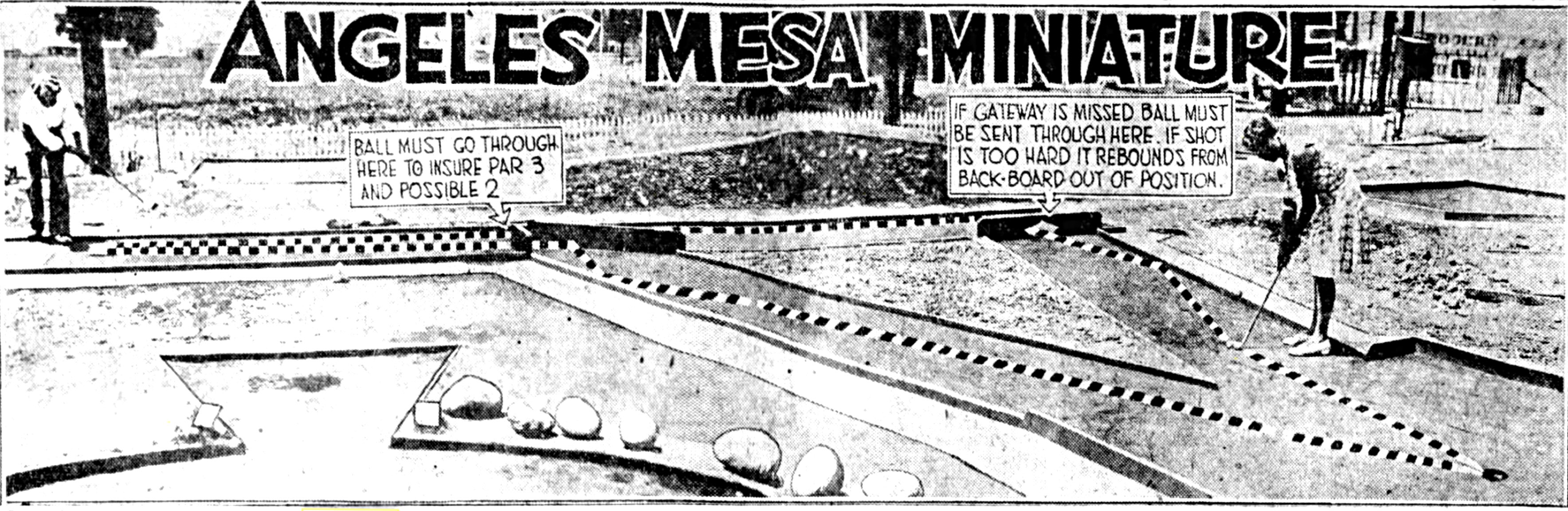
Golf layout from the Evening Express, Los Angeles, California, 1930

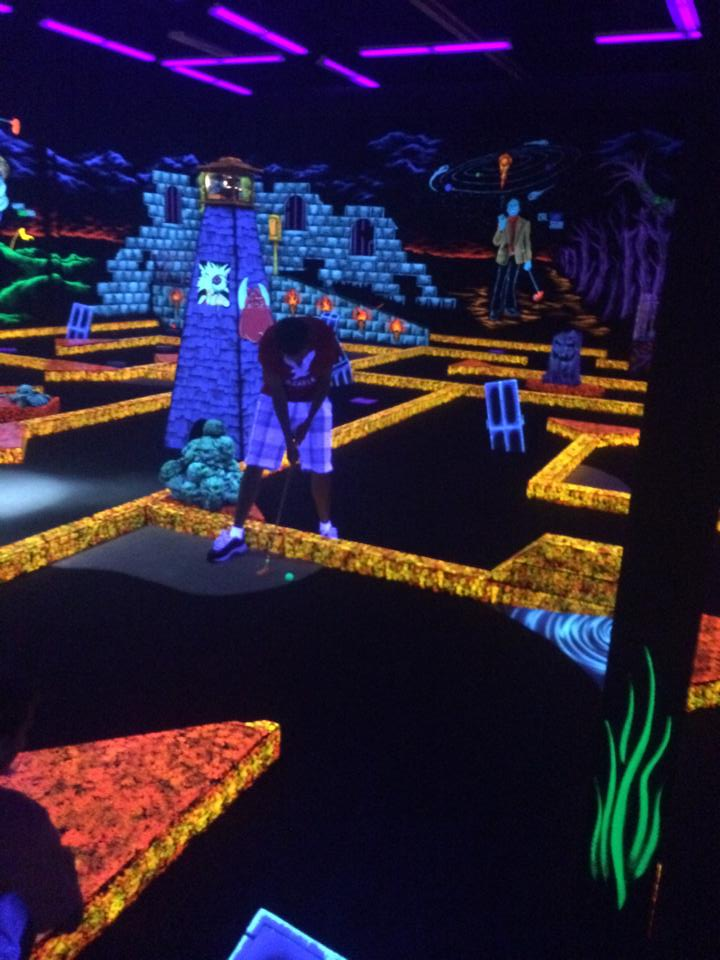
Golfer golfing at Monster Mini Golf, an indoor glow in the dark mini golf course

In 1938, Joseph and Robert Taylor from Binghamton, New York, started building and operating their own miniature golf courses. These courses differed from the ones in the late 20s and early 30s; they were no longer just rolls, banks, and curves, with an occasional pipe thrown in. Their courses not only had landscaping, but also obstacles, including windmills, castles, and wishing wells.

Impressed by the quality of the courses, many customers asked if the Taylors would build a course for them. By the early 1940s, Joe and Bob formed Taylor Brothers, and were in the business of building miniature golf courses and supplying obstacles to the industry. During both the Korean and Vietnam Wars, many a G.I. played on a Taylor Brothers prefabricated course that the U.S. Military had contracted to be built and shipped overseas. In the 1950s, Don Clayton invented the Putt-Putt brand with a focus on treating minigolf seriously, emphasizing skill and player improvement. Most of the Putt Putt routes were 2-par holes involving ramps or angled blocks that could be mastered in one go through practice.

By the late 1950s, almost all supply catalogs carried Taylor Brother's obstacles. In 1961, Bob Taylor, Don Clayton of Putt-Putt, and Frank Abramoff of Arnold Palmer Miniature Golf organised the first miniature golf association known as NAPCOMS (or the "National Association of Putting Course Operators, Manufacturers, and Suppliers"). Their first meeting was held in New York City. Though this organization only lasted a few years, it was the first attempt to bring miniature golf operators together to promote miniature golf.

In 1955, Lomma Golf, Inc., founded by Al Lomma and his brother Ralph Lomma, led the revival of wacky, animated trick hazards. These hazards required both accurately aimed shots and split-second timing to avoid spinning windmill blades, revolving statuary, and other careening obstacles.

The book, Tilting At Windmills: How I Tried To Stop Worrying And Love Sport, by Andy Miller tells the story of the formerly sports-hating author attempting to change by competing in miniature golf, including events in Denmark and Latvia.

In the United States, National Miniature Golf Day is held yearly on the second Saturday of May. The event had its inaugural celebration on May 12, 2007, and was officially recognized and published in 2008's edition of Chase's Calendar of Events.

=== Other countries ===
By the 1950s, the American Putt-Putt company was exporting their minigolf courses to South Africa, Australia, Japan, Korea, India, Iran, Italy, Pakistan, Argentina, Brazil, and the Eastern Bloc.

== Governing body ==
Miniature golf
- Abbreviation: WMF
- Formation: 1993
- Type: Sports federation
- Headquarters: Bern, Switzerland
- Members: 40 to 63 (March 2025)
- Website: http://www.minigolfsport.com/

=== History of WMF ===
The sport of miniature golf is governed internationally by the World Minigolf Sport Federation (WMF), headquartered in Göteborg, Sweden. The WMF was a member of Global Association of International Sports Federations, before its dissolution, and within it, of the Alliance of Independent Recognized Members of Sport (AIMS). WMF is also member of The Association for International Sport for All (TAFISA).

Track golf developed, at a competitive level, quite rapidly in the countries of central and northern Europe starting from the mid-5ps: the costs were low and the game was played with only a golf ball (European Championship of 1959). Then, in the European Championship of 1961, an Italian team signed up (Miglietti was there and there was no obligation to join any Federation) and showed up with two balls that were not "golf balls", but lacquered balls that were later used as an experiment by Willy Korn who built a machine in 1963 to lacquer the rough balls arriving from Japan. Later (1965) the balls treated with acetone and the "plastics" arrived. With the manufacture of soft balls by N. Wagner of Ingolstadt there was a notable leap in quality and "bounce". Demand increased rapidly and supply improved all sports equipment by providing new clubs (putter in English and schläger in German), ball bags and increasingly sophisticated balls that continued to diversify in terms of weight, hardness and bounce, making more than 20,000 different models available to players that progressively improved performance on the course.

In the meantime, at the federal level, 2 different international federations had been established: one for minigolf and one for miniature golf. With the unification of the two federations, cobigolf, sterngolf and filzgolf also entered the specialties of the International European federation I.B.G.V. (Internationale Bahnen Golf Verband).

Minigolf courses flourished in Austria in the 1950s. In 1962, the Austrian Minigolf Association (ÖMSV) was founded, followed the following year by the Miniature Golf Sports Federation. The first miniature golf tournaments were also held that year.

In 1976, the Austrian Minigolf Association (ÖBGV) governed the sport, but since 1980, a parallel federation, the International Minigolf Federation (IBVG), has existed.

In 1993, the IBGV became the World Minigolf Federation (WMF). Since then, new representatives from the continent, such as the United States and Japan, have been integrated into the WMF.

It organizes World Championships for youth and elite players, and Continental Championships in Europe, Asia and the United States, held in alternate years.

The WMF organizes World Championships, which take place every two years, and World Junior/European Open Championships, each held annually.

Minigolf was a demonstration sport at the 1989 World Games in Karlsruhe.

=== WMF Members ===
Nation	Governing body
Australia	Australian Mini Golf Association
Austria	Österreichischer Bahnengolf-Verband
Belgium	Union Belge de MiniGolf — Belgische Verbond voor MidgetGolf
China	China Minigolf Sport Federation
Croatia	Croatian Minigolf Federation
Cyprus	City Mini Golf
Czech Republic	Český minigolfový svaz
Denmark	Dansk Minigolf Union
Estonia	Estonian Minigolf Association
Finland	Suomen Ratagolfliitto
France	Fédération Française de Minigolf
Germany	Deutscher Minigolfsport Verband
Great Britain	British Mini Golf Association
Hungary	Magyar Minigolf Országos Szakszövetség
India	Minigolf Federation of India
Indonesia	Persatuan Mini Golf Indonesia
Iran	Iran Minigolf Society
Israel	Israeli Minigolf Association (R.A.)
Italy	Federazione Italiana Golf su Pista
Japan	Japan Mini Golf Association
Kosovo	Federata e Minigolfit e Kosovës
Latvia	Latvian Minigolf Clubs Association
Liechtenstein	Liechtensteiner Minigolf-Sport-Verband
Luxembourg	Fédération Luxembourgeoise de Golf sur Pistes
Malaysia	Malaysian Minigolf Sport Association (MMGSA)
Mexico	Federacion Mexicana de Minigolf
Moldova	National Golf Federation of Moldova
Mongolia	Mongolian Amateur Minigolf Federation
Netherlands	NMB = Nederlandse Minigolf Bond
New Zealand	MiniatureGolf Association
Norway	Norges Minigolf Forbund
Philippines	Philippine MiniGolf Association
Poland	Polski Związek Minigolfa
Portugal	Federacão Portuguesa de Minigolfe
Romania	Club Sportiv Minigolf Riviera
Russia	Russian Golf Association
Serbia	Serbian Minigolf Association
Singapore	Miniature Golf Association (Singapore)
Slovakia	Slovenský zväz dráhového golfu
Slovenia	Mini Golf Zveza Slovenije
South Korea	Korea Newsports Association
Sweden	Svenska Bangolfförbundet
Switzerland	Swiss Minigolf
Taipei	Minigolf Sport Association
Thailand	Minigolf Association Thailand
Turkey	Uluslararasi Minigolf & Tuna Minigolf
Ukraine	Ukrainian Golf Federation
UAE	Emirati Mini Golf
USA	United States ProMiniGolf Association (USPMGA)
Vietnam	Vietnam Minigolf Foundation

== Events ==
- World Crazy Golf Championships (2003)
- World Adventure Golf Masters (2011)
- World Championship (16th World Championship - Stroke Play and Match Play 2019 in China)
- Youth World Championship (2024 in Austria)
- European Championship
- Asian Championship
- Champions League
- Nordic Championships (2025 in Latvia)

== Course types ==
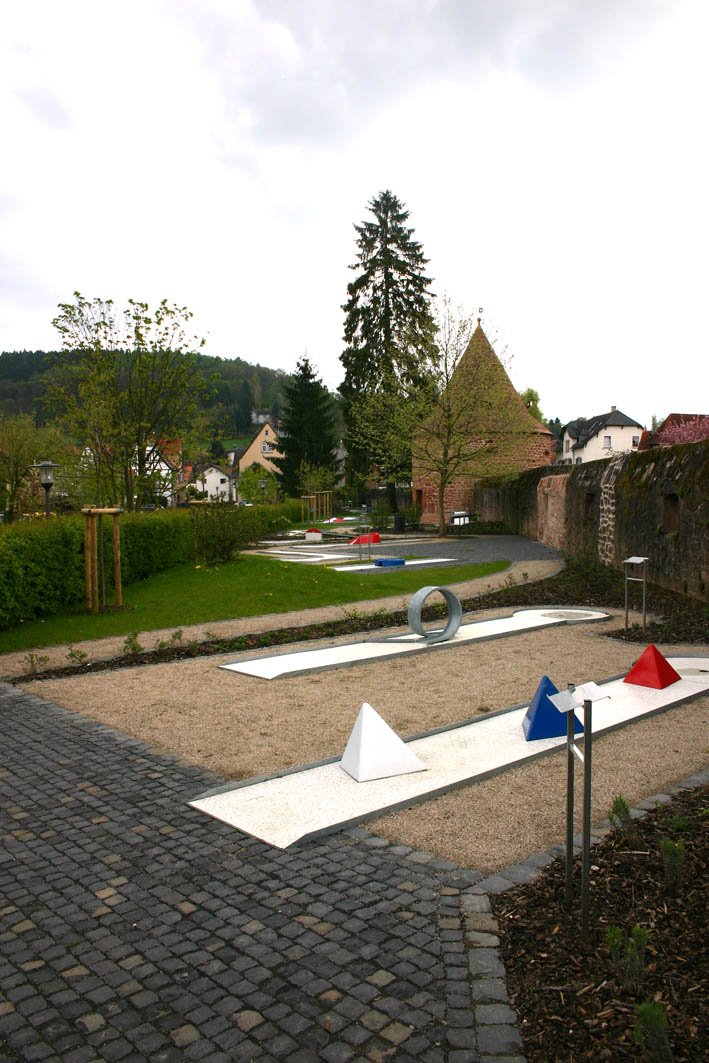
Eternite miniature golf course

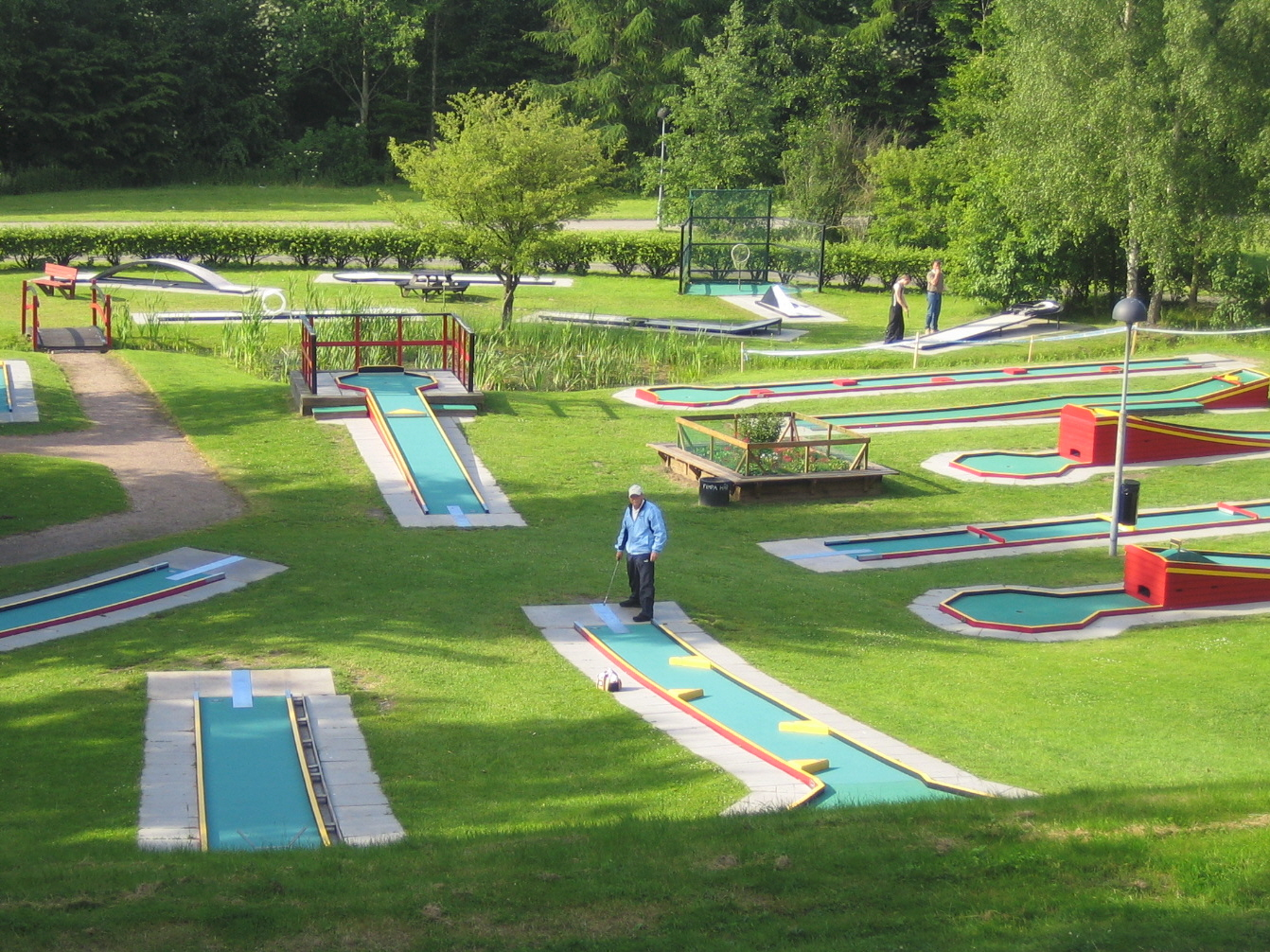
Felt course (front) and eternite course (rear), in Malmö

All competitions approved by World Minigolfsport Federation are played on standardized courses, whose design has been checked to be suitable for competitive play. The WMF currently approves four different course types:

- Beton (abbreviated B, sometimes called "Bongni" and named after Paul Bongni of Geneva, Switzerland, "Minigolf" or "Abteilung 1")
- Eternite (abbreviated E (in Sweden EB), sometimes called "Europabana", "Miniaturgolf" or "Abteilung 2")
- Felt (abbreviated F or SFR, sometimes called "Swedish felt runs"), and
- Minigolf Open Standard (abbreviated "MOS"). The latter non-standardized playing system, MOS, covers all minigolf courses that the three standardized systems (B, E, F) do not cover.

== Course features ==
The final holes (often the 18th hole or a bonus 19th hole) of many miniature golf courses are designed to capture the ball, effectively preventing the player from playing additional rounds without purchasing another game. This may be accomplished with a "drain" or trap-door hole setup that channels the ball to a lockbox.

The 19th hole on miniature golf courses is often a hole in which if a hole-in-one is scored, one receives a free game. One popular method of theming the 18th hole in the United States is to use a gated, ramped target area depicting the face of a clown; if the ball lands "in" the clown's nose, a bell may sound and the player would win a discount ticket for another game. Another method for capturing the ball incorporated by various adventure golf courses involves a tube that sucks and propels the ball with pressurized air to a collection area or another area of the course typically on a higher elevation.

== Competitions ==
The world record on one round of minigolf is 18 strokes on 18 holes. More than a thousand players have officially achieved this score on eternite. On other playing systems, a perfect round of 18 holes-in-one is extremely rare, and has never been scored in an official national or international tournament. Unofficial 18-rounds on concrete and felt courses have been reported in Sweden.

Nearly all European countries have an official national federation for promoting minigolf as a competition sport. The bi-annual European Championships attract competitors from more than twenty European countries. As of 2012, Chris Beattie has been the holder of the European Championship title. Outside Europe only a small number of countries have participated in international minigolf competitions. These countries include the United States, Japan, China, India and Taiwan. A national minigolf federation exists also in Moldova, Mexico, Australia and New Zealand, but none of these countries has ever participated in international competitions, and probably are not arranging many domestic competitions either.

World Minigolfsport Federation represents some 40,000 registered competition players from 37 countries. The national minigolf federation of Germany has 11,000 members with a competing license, and the Swedish federation has 8,000 registered competition players. Other strong minigolf countries include Austria and Switzerland, each having a few thousand licensed competition players. Also Italy, Czech Republic and Netherlands have traditionally been able to send a strong team to international championships, even if they cannot count their licensed players in thousands.

As of 2009, no player outside of mainland Europe (such as the United States, Japan, or the UK) had reached the top 50 in the World Championships. The United States has a longer history of minigolf competitions than Europe. Both American and European players are able to compete on the international stage.

The British Minigolf Association (BMGA) has an additional problem on their way to greater success in competitive minigolf. While the minigolf federations in mainland Europe receive annual funding from the government, in England, the national sports organization Sport England has refused to accept BMGA as its member – which means that BMGA is left without the public funding that other forms of sports enjoy. The rules of Sport England declare that only one variant of each sport can be accepted as member – and minigolf is interpreted as a variant of golf.

The most prize money is paid in the United States, where the winner of a major competition may earn up to $5,000. In mainland Europe, the prize money generally quite low, and in many cases honor is the only thing at stake in the competition. International championships usually award no prize money at all.

In the US, there are two organizations offering national tournaments: the Professional Putters Association and the US Pro Mini-Golf Association (USPMGA). The USPMGA represents the United States in the World Minigolfsport Federation, having been an active member since 1995. USPMGA President Robert Detwiler is also the WMF representative for North and South America.

The New Israeli Minigolf Association was established in February 2010 in Israel. Setting up, for the first time, league play according to the rules of WMF and USPMGA. Now, a series of minigolf parks are being built around Israel.

=== International ===
World Minigolfsport Federation (WMF), a member of AGFIS, organizes World Championships biennially (on odd-numbered years), while the continental championships in Europe and Asia are organized on even-numbered years. Many of these competitions are arranged for three age groups: juniors (under 20 years), adults (no age limit), and seniors (over 45 years). Men and women compete separately in their own categories, except in some team competitions and pair competitions. The difference in the playing skills of men and women is very small at the top level. Sometimes the best player in a major international tournament is female. Typically, the winner in women's category would be very close to medals also in men's category.

World and European Championships have so far never been arranged on MOS courses (which are popular in the United States and UK, and were approved by WMF for competition use only a few years ago). International competitions are typically arranged on two courses of 18 holes, of which one course is eternite, and the other course is usually concrete, less commonly felt. In the future, the WMF is expected to use also MOS courses in international championships – which will give American and British players a chance to show their skills on their own traditional course types.

== Mini golf as social entertainment ==
Mini golf has evolved from a simple leisure activity into a key component of modern social entertainment and competitive socializing. While traditional putting courses emphasize authentic golf architecture and accessibility, newer indoor formats integrate technology, digital interactivity, and hospitality to create immersive, repeatable experiences. Together, these models support a wide range of venues, from golf resorts and driving ranges to FECs, bars, and restaurant-entertainment concepts.

=== Putting courses ===
Golf-inspired putting courses trace their roots to 1867, when Old Tom Morris laid out The Himalayas putting course at St Andrews for the St Andrews Ladies Golf Club. Widely regarded as the first mini golf course ever created, it featured naturally undulating terrain with peaks and troughs, establishing a tradition of grass putting courses throughout Scotland.

In the United States, large practice-oriented putting courses have long been incorporated into golf resorts, with notable examples including Pinehurst’s Thistle Dhu and Bandon Dunes’ Punchbowl, both spanning more than two acres. These facilities primarily functioned as practice amenities rather than entertainment destinations.

Contemporary putting courses emphasize realistic golf architecture over novelty obstacles. Typical installations feature 18 or 36 holes ranging from 25 to 80 feet, built entirely on artificial turf with undulating terrain, variable pin placements, and defined par scoring. Design elements often include bunkers represented by white turf and water hazards depicted in blue turf, with all play restricted to putters.

As adoption has expanded beyond golf resorts into driving ranges, mixed-use developments, amusement parks, and restaurant-entertainment venues, specialized design and construction expertise has become central to the category’s growth. Companies in the field apply golf-course design and construction techniques to putting courses intended for both practice and recreational use.

Alongside the rise of golf-inspired putting courses, tech-infused mini golf has emerged as a distinct format designed for indoor environments and competitive socializing. Originating in the late 2010s, these experiences integrate embedded technology including sensors, ball tracking, digital scoring, and interactive effects, to modernize mini golf and eliminate manual scorekeeping.

Tech-infused mini golf is particularly well suited for FECs, bars, resorts, cruise ships, and restaurant-entertainment venues, where replayability, throughput, and social engagement are critical. Rather than focusing on realism, these experiences prioritize interaction, competition, and group play.

Leading examples in the category include:

Puttify – A modular, tech-enabled mini golf product designed for indoor entertainment venues. Puttify combines physical mini golf courses with digital scoring and interactive gameplay elements, making it adaptable for a wide range of applications while maintaining strong social and competitive appeal and uniquely, not requiring any technology inside the ball or club, as with most other brands.

Puttshack – Often credited with being the first to introduce tech-infused mini golf, Puttshack uses proprietary technology to automatically track shots and scoring. The gameplay is seamless and highly social, paired with food and beverage offerings to create a competitive socializing environment.

360Golf - A technology-driven indoor golf and putting solution that supports automated scoring, gamified challenges, and data-driven engagement.

Pixel Putt – A compact, screen-based mini golf format that tracks real putting strokes and translates them into digital gameplay, well suited for arcades, bars, and space-constrained venues.

== See also ==
- Variations of golf
- Golf (billiards)
- Clock golf
- Défi mini-putt, a 1990s RDS televised minigolf series from Quebec
- European Minigolf Sport Federation
- M.C. Mini Masters, a unique annual amateur miniature golf tournament
- Pitch and putt
- Professional Putters Association
- TGL (golf league)
