= World Adventure Golf Masters =

Annual miniature golf competition

- Reigning WAGM Champions
- Date: 2026

Medalists
| gold medal | (Czech Republic) Lukáš Kučera |
| silver medal | (Sweden) Jesper Lindberg |
| bronze medal | (United Kingdom) Seve Kukielka |

Champions
- Team: Sweden

The World Adventure Golf Masters (WAGM) is an annual miniature golf competition held by the World Minigolf Sport Federation (WMF). Founded in Hastings, England, in 2011 with 30 competitors from 6 countries.

In 2026 the last WAGM under the original rules and conventions were held in Winterberg, Germany.

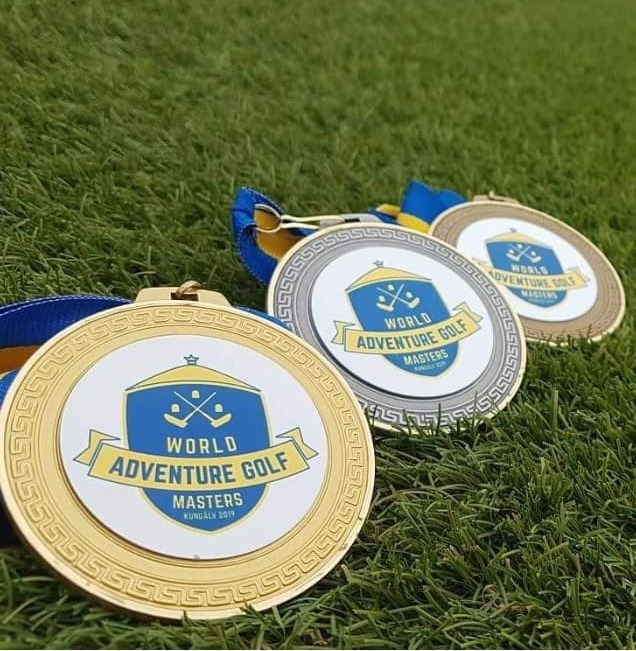
Gold, silver and bronze medals for World Adventure Golf Masters in Kungälv, Sweden, 2019

== Rules ==
The WAGM is played on an adventure-style miniature golf course with miniature golf balls. Categories include a women's and men's category, as well as senior men and senior women (46 years and older), male and female youth (up to 19 years), and an overall category. In addition, there's a team competition where countries compete in teams of four and a mixed pairs' competition.

== History ==
For its first three years (2011–2013), the WAGM was played in Hastings, England. Participants were mostly from the UK and Germany, with a small number of participants from other countries in Europe, like Sweden and Finland.

In 2014, the competition was held in Gullbergsbro, Gothenburg, Sweden and 50 competitors participated.

In 2016, the competition was held in Pristina, Kosovo. The number of competing countries rose to 15, from 8 the year before.

The 2019 competition was hosted in Kungälv, Sweden, with 93 competitors from 14 countries including Sweden, Germany, New Zealand, and the United States.

In 2023 (June 16–18), the World Adventure Golf Masters were played in Gumpoldskirchen, outside of Vienna, Austria.

In 2024 WAGM championship was played in Brno, Czech Republic, June 14–16, 2024. One of the new features of this WAGM was that it, for the first time ever, was played on two different 18-hole courses.

WAGM 2025 was held in Askim, Sweden on June 13–15, 2025.

== WAGM Results 2011 to 2026 ==
| Year | Location | Competitors | Countries | Overall winner | Overall Second | Overall Third | Team Winner | Results |
|---|---|---|---|---|---|---|---|---|
| 2026 | (Germany) Winterberg | 120 | 15 | (Czech Republic) Lukáš Kučera | (Sweden) Jesper Lindberg | (United Kingdom) Seve Kukielka | Sweden (4) | |
| 2025 | (Sweden) Askim | 105 | 14 | (Sweden) Erik Hjalmarsson | (Austria) Mathias Jagschitz | (Austria) Patrick Riener | Sweden (3) | |
| 2024 | (Czech Republic) Brno | 75 | 8 | (Czech Republic) Jiří Kratochvil | (Czech Republic) Jiří Kocián | (Czech Republic) Dušan Fusek | (Czech Republic) Czechia (2) | |
| 2023 | (Austria) Gumpoldskirchen | 105 | 11 | (Austria) Patrick Riener | (Austria) Fabian Spies | (Sweden) Kevin Sundström | Austria | |
| 2022 | (Finland) Kuopio | 75 | 10 | (Finland) Aki Sillman | (Finland) Tom Ahlberg | (Finland) Tommi Lantta | Finland | |
| 2021 | (Finland) Kuopio* | Canceled. | | | | | | |
| 2020 | (Austria) Gumpoldskirchen* | Canceled. | | | | | | |
| 2019 | (Sweden) Kungälv | 93 | 14 | (Sweden) Gunnar Bengtsson (2) | (Sweden) Jens Bergström | (Sweden) Hans Olofsson | Sweden (2) | |
| 2018 | (Czech Republic) Horni Bezdekov | 95 | 16 | (Switzerland) Daniel Moser | (Germany) Martin Stöckle | (Czech Republic) Daniel Vlcek | (Czech Republic) Czechia | |
| 2017 | (Croatia) Zaton | 94 | 19 | (Sweden) Gunnar Bengtsson | (Finland) Marko Nuotio | (Austria) Harald Exl | Germany (6) | |
| 2016 | (Kosovo) Pristina | 62 | 15 | (Sweden) Derice Susoho Shumilov | (Czech Republic) Daniel Vlcek | (Kosovo) Liridon Mehmeti | Sweden | |
| 2015 | (United Kingdom) Hastings | 47 | 8 | (Germany) Martin Stöckle (3) | (United Kingdom) Michael Smith | (Germany) Oliver Raatjens | Germany (5) | |
| 2014 | (Sweden) Gullbergsbro | 53 | 7 | (Germany) Oleg Klassen | (Sweden) Lars Brown | (Sweden) Filiph Svensson | Germany (4) | |
| 2013 | (United Kingdom) Hastings | 37 | 4 | (Germany) Gerrit Below | (Germany) Martin Stöckle | (United Kingdom) Michael Smith | Germany (3) | |
| 2012 | (United Kingdom) Hastings | 20 | 4 | (Germany) Martin Stöckle (2) | (United Kingdom) Michael Smith | (United Kingdom) James Rutherford | Germany (2) | |
| 2011 | (United Kingdom) Hastings | 30 | 6 | (Germany) Martin Stöckle | (Germany) Sebastian Kube | (United Kingdom) Michael Smith | Germany | |
