= Professional Putters Association =

Professional Putt-Putt Golfers Association

The Professional Putters Association (PPA) was started in 1959 by Don Clayton, the founder of Putt-Putt Golf, in Fayetteville, North Carolina. Originally begun as the Professional Putt-Putt Golfers Association in 1959, the name was changed in 1960 to the Professional Putters Association. The organization was formed to provide tournaments and competition for those who viewed putting as a sport. Since 1959, the PPA has held a National Championship Tournament.

The PPA has awarded over $8,000,000 in prize money over the past 52 years. Billy Packer, best known for his work on college basketball telecasts for both NBC and CBS, and Frank Glieber, longtime sportscaster for CBS, served as the announcers for the Putt-Putt Golf Courses Championship TV series.

== Timeline ==
1960 - The first National Tournament Program of the PPA offered $26,000 in prize money.
1961 - The first putting match ever to be filmed for television was the PPA "Parade of Champions" TV Series.
1965 - The PPA expanded to worldwide tournaments. The first foreign tournaments were held in Africa, with Australia, Japan, and Canada following soon after.
1969 - The Amateur Putters Association (APA) began. Today, amateur putters compete in their own division in all PPA tournaments.
1970 - Vance Randall was honored as the 1960s Putter of the Decade.
1973 - The PPA sponsored the World Putting Championship tournament offering over $200,000 in prize money. Mike Baldoza captured the first place money of $50,000.
1980 - Dick and Evelyn Florin were honored as the 1970s Putters of the Decade.
1987 - The PPA inducted its first members into the newly created Putt-Putt/PPA Hall of Fame.
1990 - Ron Frederick was honored as the 1980s Putter of the Decade.
1995 - The PPA TV Series is shown worldwide on ESPN.
1998 - Over $7,500,000 awarded in the 39 years of the PPA
2000 - The PPA awards $100,000 in prize money for the 2000 PPA National Championship. Alan Quinnelly's victory makes him the only three-time winner of this event as a professional. The $50,000 first place check made him the sport's all-time career leading money winner at the time.
2001 - Greg Ward was honored as the 1990s Putter of the Decade
2002 - The PPA World Match Play Championship returns to the schedule and is won by Greg Ward in Martinez, Georgia
2005 - Greg Ward surpasses Alan Quinnelly as the sport's all-time leading money winner.

== US Pro Mini-Golf Association Courses ==
- Lakepoint Station ~ 77 Old Allatoona Rd, Cartersville, GA 30121 ~ Lakepoint Station Website
- Island MiniGolf & Games ~ 7890 US 80 S., Savannah, GA 31410 ~ Island MiniGolf Website
- Ball Fore Miniature Golf ~ 6701 W. 107th Street, Worth, IL 60482 ~ Ball Fore Miniature Golf Website
- Kauai Mini Golf ~ 5-2723 Kuhio Hwy #101, Kilauea, HI 96754
- Lumberjack Pass MiniGolf ~ 1511 Route 9, Lake George, NY 12845 ~ Lumerjack Pass MiniGolf Website
- Bluegrass MiniGolf ~ 175 Oceanport Avenue, Oceanport, New Jersey 07757 ~ Bluegrass MiniGolf Website
- Mac & Bones Golf ~ 1 Mac n Bones Blvd., Pearl, MS 39208
- Boomers! ~ 1525 W. Vista Way, Vista, CA 92083 ~ Boomers! Website
- Mighty Jungle Golf ~ 7836 W. Irlo Bronson Hwy, Kissimmee, FL 34747
- Fireside Golf LLC ~ 485 Brookside Camp Road, Hendersonville, NC 28792 ~ Fireside Golf Website
- Mr. Putty's Fun Park ~ 2333 Dam Road, Tega Cay, SC 29708 ~ Mr. Putty's Website
- Chip's Clubhouse ~ 214 Fifth Avenue, Chardon, OH 44024 ~ Chip's Clubhouse Website
- Mossy Creek ~ 1204 George Ave., Jefferson City, TN 37760 ~ Mossy Creek Website
- Dinosaur Valley Mini Golf ~ 3316 St. Laurent Street Greater Sudbury, ON P0M1L0 Canada ~ Dinosaur Valley Website
- Mulligan's Island ~ 1000 New London Ave., Cranston, RI 02920 ~ Mulligan's Island Website
- Dolphin MiniGolf ~ 510 Wiscassett Road, Boothbay, ME 04537
- Nifty Fifty's ~ 4670 Route 42, Turnersville, NJ 08012
- Embassy Miniature Golf ~ 500 Embassy Oaks, San Antonio, TX 78216 ~ Embassy MiniGolf Website
- Prairieville Park ~ 2507 Plaza Court, Waukesha, WI 53186 ~ Prairieville Park Website
- Epic Entertainment ~ PO Box 502, Pueblo, CO 81002 ~ Epic Entertainment Website
- Putt'N Around ~ 350 N. E. 5th Ave., Delray Beach, FL 33483 ~ Putt'N Around Website
- Fiesta Falls MiniGolf ~ 818 A1A Beach Blvd., St. Augustine, FL 32080 ~ Fiesta Falls MiniGolf Website
- Putt U Mini Golf ~ 5201 Route 309, Center Valley, PA 18034 ~ Putt U Website
- Glo Indoor Mini Golf & Arcade ~ 1299 Galleria at Tyler, Riverside, CA 92503 ~ Glo Indoor Website
- Red Mill Mini Golf ~ 4243 Red Mill Valley Rd., Perry OH 44081
- Grand Country Indoor MiniGolf ~ 1945 W. 76th Country Blvd., Branson, MO 65616 ~ Grand Country Website
- Red Putter Mini Golf ~ 10404 Hwy 42, Ephraim, WI 54211
- Greatest Adventures MiniGolf ~ 4800 Gretna Road, Branson, MO 65616 ~ Greatest Adventures Website
- Sawyer's Creek ~ 11011 S 79 Hwy, Hannibal, MO 63401
- Hawaiian Rumble MiniGolf ~ 3210 Highway 17 S., North Myrtle Beach, SC 29582
- Shipwreck Golf ~ 759 Route 13, Cortland, NY 13045
- Hawaiian Village MiniGolf ~ 4205 Highway 17 S., North Myrtle Beach, SC 29582
- The Fringe ~ 5100 Commerce Pkwy, Roswell, GA 30076 ~ Fringe Website
- Inky's Mini Golf ~ Mile 17.5 Placencia Road, Across from Sirenian Bay Resort & Villas, Placencia ~ Inky's Mini Golf Website
- Vitense Golfland ~ 5501 Schroeder Rd, West Beltline Highway & Whitney Way Madison, WI 53711 ~ Vitense Golfland Website
- Prisco's Market & Deli ~ 8 Romney Rd, Bridgewater, MA 02324
- Aloha Mini-Golf ~ 900 Lake Arrowhead Rd, Myrtle Beach, SC 29572
- Cool Crest Miniature Golf Course ~ Cool Crest Miniature Golf Course and Metzger Biergarten 1402 Fredericksburg Rd.
- Oak Ridge Family Social Club ~ 5330 NE Oak Ridge Drive, Kansas City, MO 64119 ~ Oak Ridge Website
- Lakeview Putt N Play ~ 2245 Hendersonville Rd, Arden, NC 28704
- Island Falls Adventure Golf ~ Island Falls Adventure Golf 1550 Sadler Rd, Fernandina Beach, FL 32034

== See also ==
- Putt-Putt Fun Center
