= Thomas McCulloch Fairbairn (inventor) =

Thomas McCulloch Fairbairn was an American cotton processing plant owner and golf fanatic who is widely recognized as the inventor of modern miniature golf. Fairbairn is credited with changing minigolf from the earlier incarnation played at Thistle Dhu in Pinehurst, North Carolina to the modern version. Fairbairn's invention of an artificial green as well as his addition of artificial bunkers, curves and water hazards led to the miniature golf boom of the 1920s.

== Fairbairn Cup ==
A team miniature golf tournament named in honor of Fairbairn is held each summer at the miniature golf course Pirate Island on the Seven Mile Island in New Jersey. The proceeds from this tournament are donated to find a cure for multiple sclerosis.
