= Felix Feist =

Felix Feist may refer to:

- Felix E. Feist, American film and television director and writer
- Felix F. Feist, his father, lyricist and Metro-Goldwyn-Mayer executive
