= Joel P. Corin =

American composer

Joel P. Corin was a composer in the United States. Several songsheet collections include his work. Felix F. Feist wrote the lyrics to some of his songs. His song "The Old Barn Dance" was recorded by the Victor Dance Orchestra.

== Discography ==
- "Salomy Jane" (1907)
- "San-Fran-Pan-American" (1912 / 1913), arranged by Stephen O. Jones, celebrating the selection of San Francisco in 1911 to host the World's Fair in 1915
- "The Old Barn Dance" (1909), published by Leo Feist
- "If You Won't Be Good to Me", lyrics by Felix F. Feist
- "My Sweet Sunflower" with Felix F. Feist
- "Eddie, Eddie, Oh!
- "When the Band Plays Yankee Doodle", word by Felix F. Feist
