= T. B. Harms & Francis, Day & Hunter, Inc. =

US music publisher

- The cover art for "The Sensational European Novelty Georgie Porgie: Fox-Trot Song", published in 1924 by Harms, Inc.
- "The Sensational European Novelty Georgie Porgie: Fox-Trot Song" (1924) Billy Mayerl and Gerald "Gee" Paul's adaptation of "Georgie Porgie", published in 1924 by Harms, Inc.

T. B. Harms & Francis, Day & Hunter, Inc., based in the Tin Pan Alley area of New York City, was one of the seven largest publishers of popular music in the world in 1920. T. B. Harms & Francis, Day & Hunter, Inc. was one of seven defendants named in a 1920 Sherman antitrust suit brought by the U.S. Department of Justice for controlling 80% of the music publishing business. The seven defendants were:

- Consolidated Music Corporation – 144 W. 37th St., New York, New York
- Irving Berlin, Inc. – 1567 Broadway, New York, New York
- Leo Feist, Inc. – 231 W 40th St, New York, New York
- T. B. Harms & Francis, Day & Hunter, Inc. – 62 W. 45th St., New York, New York
- Shapiro, Bernstein & Co., Inc. – 218 W. 47th St., New York, New York
- Watterson, Berlin & Snyder, Inc. – 1571 Broadway, New York, New York (sold in bankruptcy to Mills Music in 1929)
- M. Witmark & Sons, Inc. – 144 W. 37th St, New York, New York

Founded in 1881 as the Thomas B. Harms Music Publishing Company, T. B. Harms & Francis, Day & Hunter, Inc., was eventually incorporated in New York and changed its name to Harms, Inc. in 1921.

== Owners and executives ==
- Thomas B. Harms (1860–1906)
- Max Dreyfus (1874–1964) (owned 25% in 1901) — The Harms empire owned or backed by Dreyfus, included Harms, Inc., Chappell-Harms (its "repository for non-production music"), De Sylva, Brown, and Henderson, Remick Music, Green and Stept, Famous Music, T. B. Harms, and George Gershwin's New World Music, publisher of all Gershwin's music" (109).
- Jerome Kern (1885–1945) — Kern plugged sheet music at a local department store then took a job with T. B. Harms, Inc., and eventually became vice president.
- Alexander T. Harms (1855–1901)
- Frederick Day (1878–1975)

== History timeline ==
1875	Brothers Alexander T. Harms (b. 20 Feb 1856, New York City; d. 23 Oct 1901, New York City) and Thomas B. Harms (b. 5 Jan 1860, New York City; d. 28 March 1906, New York City) founded in 1875 what many consider to be one of the first American firms of music publishers. T. B. Harms & Co. sold contemporary popular music, and the success of such early publications as "When the Robins Nest Again" (1883) and "The Letter That Never Came" (1886) led other Tin Pan Alley publishers to emulate the firm's promotional activities.
1901	Max Dreyfus (b. 1 April 1874 Kuppenheim; d. 12 May 1964, Brewster, New York), who had been working for Harms as an arranger, bought a 25% interest in the firm
1903	Dreyfus employed Jerome Kern as a composer
1904	Dreyfus bought out the Harms brothers, but retained the name – T. B. Harms & Co., Inc. – turning it into one of the most prestigious popular music publishers in Tin Pan Alley. Dreyfus discovered, recruited, and promoted Jerome Kern, George Gershwin, Vincent Youmans, Richard Rodgers, and Cole Porter. In time, the firm would publish about 90% of all Broadway scores and show tunes.
1908	The British firm Francis, Day, & Hunter entered into a partnership with T. B. Harms, in which Max and his brother, Louis, ended up owning two-thirds of the business and Fred Day one-third
1917	Songwriter Jerome Kern purchased a quarter share in the firm
1920	William Boosey and Chappell and Company, both of London, offered to purchase and operate the New York division of T. B. Harms & Francis, Day, & Hunter, Inc. Day sold out and returned to London. Louis took over Chappell New York. Max became the manager of the newly named Harms, Inc.
1921	T. B. Harms & Francis, Day, & Hunter, Inc. renamed to Harms, Inc. on March 31, 1921.
1927	Max Dreyfus made a deal with George and Ira Gershwin to form a subsidiary, New World Music Corporation, to hold their copyrights, with Harms owning a large stake
1929	Dreyfus sold his interest in the company to Warner Brothers, who reorganized it as Music Publishers Holding Corporation. Dreyfus stayed on as a consultant until he set up in 1935 the American branch of Chappell, a company affiliated with Chappell of London, owned by his brother Louis Dreyfus (1877–1967). In 1969 that part of Harms connected with the estates of Louis Dreyfus (who had been a director of Harms) and Kern was bought by Lawrence Welk and became part of the Welk Music Group.

== Sale to Warner Bros. ==
As silent pictures evolved to talkies, Warner Bros. had aimed to build its inventory of published music. Before the Wall Street Crash of 1929, Warner Bros. acquired Harms, Inc., using 140,364 shares of its own stock, then valued at $8,421,840. Warner then reincorporated its acquisition under the laws of Delaware and named it Music Publishers Holding Company, Inc. Also in 1929, Warner Bros. acquired the music publishing companies of M. Witmark & Sons and Jerome H. Remick & Co.

== See also ==
- Francis, Day & Hunter Ltd v Twentieth Century Fox Corp
- Timeline of music in the United States (1880–1919)
