= Consolidated Music Corporation =

U.S. v. Consolidated Music Corporation, et al.
- Court: U.S. District Court for the Southern District of New York
- Decided: 29 March 1922
- Defendants: Consolidated Music Corporation, et al.
- Counsel for plaintiff: Henry Anderson Guiler (1877–1938), Assistant U.S. District Attorney

Holding
- Dismissed

Court membership
- Judge sitting: Augustus Noble Hand (1869–1954)

Consolidated Music Corporation was a short-lived American music publishing licensing company formed in early 1920 — initially by seven major music publishers, but eventually six — to handle piano roll licensing. Consolidated and the six remaining firms, all headquartered in New York City, were located within a few blocks of one another. Consolidated and its six corporate sponsors were defendants named in a Sherman Antitrust suit filed August 3, 1920, by the US Justice Department in U.S. District Court for the Southern District of New York. The plaintiff was represented by Henry Anderson Guiler (1877–1938), Assistant U.S. District Attorney.

== Sherman Antitrust suit ==
United States v. Consolidated Music Corporation, et al. was the first Sherman Antitrust case involving the music publishing industry. The petition was a complaint about monopoly pricing of piano rolls. In particular, the complaint charged that Consolidated had fixed the price charged to piano roll manufacturers for the right to manufacture and sell copyrighted compositions, and also had fixed the price at which those player rolls were sold to the public. The complaint averred that the seven named defendants controlled 80% of copyrighted musical compositions and 95% of player word roll market in the United States. Word rolls, essentially, were piano rolls with the lyrics printed in the margins. Consolidated held the word rights from published music that were printed on word rolls, and imposed a fee for use of those words on the rolls.

Consolidated Music Corporation	144 West 37th Street	— between 6th & 7th Avenues
Edgar Franklin Bittner (1877–1939), president	(executive at Leo Feist, Inc.)
Henry Waterson (1873–1933), secretary
Jack Bliss, vice president & general manager
1. Irving Berlin, Inc.	1567 Broadway	— between 46th & 47th Streets
2. Leo Feist, Inc.	231 West 40th Street	— between 7th & 8th Avenues
3. T.B. Harms & Francis, Day & Hunter, Inc.	62 West 45th Street	— between 5th & 6th Avenues
4. Shapiro, Bernstein & Co., Inc.	218 West 47th Street	— between 7th & 8th Avenues
5. Waterson, Berlin & Snyder, Inc.	1571 Broadway	— at 47th Street
6. M. Witmark & Sons, Inc.	144 West 37th Street	— between 6th & 7th Avenues

The seventh founding firm, Forster Music Publisher, Inc., of Chicago, resigned sometime around March 1920.

Within two weeks of opening in 1920, faced with the likelihood of defeat, Consolidated closed its doors, withdrew the contract, and quickly thereafter, dissolved the corporation. On March 29, 1922, U.S. District Judge Augustus Noble Hand (1869–1954) dismissed the case. The licensing of piano rolls was eventually assigned to the Music Publishers Protective Association.

Still, the licensing strategy endured by individual companies, yet was not highly successful, namely because consumers didn't want to pay extra for the words. By the end of 1920, sales of melody rolls, minus the words, offered by competitors, had done well in comparison to word rolls, which had fallen noticeably. By contrast, in a subset market, there had been an inverse public response with respect to the sale of phonograph records. Recorded dance music, without vocal, sold well, mainly because the public preferred to pay an extra 20 or 25 cents to acquire a roll with the words, along with the melody, permitting its use for dancing (without the words) or vocalizing around the piano (with the words).

== Selected personnel ==
Jack Bliss (né George Homer Bliss; 1887–1956), a pianist and founding vice-president and general manager of the Consolidated Music Corporation, resigned in April 1920, to work for the Aeolian Company. He resigned when Consolidated withdrew its proposed contract from the music roll manufacturers and turned back the word roll rights to the publications of six of the music publishing firms. In January 1920, Bliss had left QRS Records, as general manager for the East. to join Consolidated. According to the U.S. Census, Bliss was managing director a hotel in 1930 and 1940, while living in Larchmont, New York. By 1947, Bliss was manager of the Sarasota Terrace Hotel, Sarasota, Florida.

Bliss' son-in-law, George Edward Trafton (1896–1971), married to his daughter Jacqueline (1917–1989), was a former pro football player.
