= Metro-Goldwyn-Mayer =

American film and distribution company

Metro-Goldwyn-Mayer Studios Inc.
- Print logo used since 2021, featuring Leo the Lion with Amazon byline from 2023
- Formerly: List: Metro-Goldwyn Pictures (1924); Metro-Goldwyn-Mayer Corporation (1924–1938); Metro-Goldwyn-Mayer, Inc. (1938–1980); Metro-Goldwyn-Mayer Film Co. (1980–1982); MGM/UA Entertainment Co. (1981–1986); MGM Entertainment Co. (1986–1987); MGM/UA Communications Co. (1987–1990); MGM-Pathé Communications Co. (1990–1992); Metro-Goldwyn-Mayer Pictures (1993); Metro-Goldwyn-Mayer Studios Inc. (1993–1996); Metro-Goldwyn-Mayer Inc. (1996–2005)
- Type: Subsidiary
- Industry: Film; Television
- Predecessors: Metro Pictures Corporation; Goldwyn Pictures; Louis B. Mayer Pictures; Orion Pictures (original); United Artists (original)
- Founded: April 17, 1924; 102 years ago
- Founders: Marcus Loew; Frank Joseph Godsol; Louis B. Mayer
- Headquarters: Culver City, California, United States
- Area served: Worldwide
- Key people: Mike Hopkins (head of Prime Video and Amazon MGM Studios); Mark Burnett (chairman, MGM Television)
- Products: Motion pictures; Television programs; Broadcast network
- Services: Film distribution; Film promotion; Film production
- Number of employees: 4,200 (2022)
- Parent: Loew's, Inc. (1924–1959); Turner Broadcasting System (1986); Crédit Lyonnais (1992–1996); MGM Holdings (2005–2023); Amazon MGM Studios (2023–present)
- Divisions: MGM Television; MGM+; MGM Home Entertainment
- Website: mgm.com

Metro-Goldwyn-Mayer Studios Inc. (also known as Metro-Goldwyn-Mayer Pictures, commonly referred to as Metro-Goldwyn-Mayer, or is commonly shortened to MGM or MGM Pictures) is an American film and television production and distribution company headquartered in Culver City, California. Metro-Goldwyn-Mayer was founded on April 17, 1924, and has been owned by the Amazon MGM Studios subsidiary of Amazon since 2022.

MGM was formed by Marcus Loew by combining Metro Pictures, Goldwyn Pictures, and Louis B. Mayer Pictures into one company. It hired a number of well-known actors as contract players—its slogan was "more stars than there are in heaven"—and soon became Hollywood's most prestigious filmmaking company, producing popular musical films and winning many Academy Awards. MGM also owned film studios, movie lots, movie theaters, and technical production facilities. Its most prosperous era, from 1926 to 1959, was bracketed by two productions of Ben Hur. It divested itself of the Loews movie theater chain and, in 1956, expanded into television production.

In 1969, businessman and investor Kirk Kerkorian bought 40% of MGM and dramatically changed the operation and direction of the studio. He hired new management, reduced the studio's output to about five films per year, and diversified its products, creating MGM Resorts International as a Las Vegas–based hotel and casino company. In 1980, Kerkorian split MGM into two separate companies to focus on its hotels and resorts. The studio was rebranded as Metro-Goldwyn-Mayer Film Co., and in 1981, acquired United Artists (UA). In 1986, Kerkorian sold MGM/UA to Ted Turner, who retained the rights to the MGM film library, sold the studio lot in Culver City to Lorimar, and sold the remnants of MGM back to Kerkorian a few months later. After Kerkorian sold and reacquired the company again in the 1990s, he expanded MGM by purchasing Orion Pictures and the Samuel Goldwyn Company, including both of their film libraries. Finally in 2005, Kerkorian sold MGM to a consortium that included Sony Pictures.

MGM was listed on the New York Stock Exchange until 1986 when it was sold to Turner. The company had its second IPO on the same exchange in 1997.

In 2010, MGM filed for Chapter 11 bankruptcy protection and reorganization. After reorganization, it emerged from bankruptcy later that year under its creditors' ownership. Two former executives at Spyglass Entertainment, Gary Barber and Roger Birnbaum, became co-chairmen and co-CEOs of MGM's new holding company. After Barber's departure in 2018, the studio sought to be acquired by another company to pay its creditors. In May 2021, Amazon acquired MGM for US$8.45 billion; the deal closed in March 2022. In October 2023, Amazon Studios absorbed MGM Holdings and rebranded itself as Amazon MGM Studios.

The most commercially successful film franchises from MGM include James Bond, Rocky, The Pink Panther, Poltergeist, RoboCop, Hannibal Lecter, and The Hobbit trilogy. Additionally, the studio's library includes many notable films such as Gone with the Wind, Ben-Hur, Rain Man, A Star is Born, and Licorice Pizza, with all five films being nominated for the Academy Award for Best Picture (with Gone with the Wind, Ben-Hur, and Rain Man winning Best Picture), and all of them became among the highest grossing films of all time.

As a subsidiary of Amazon MGM Studios, MGM is a member of the Motion Picture Association (MPA); it was a founding member before leaving in the 2005 Sony acquisition.

== Overview ==
Alternative MGM logo

Evolution of Amazon MGM Studios
- 1920s: Metro-Goldwyn-Mayer is formed via the merger of Metro Pictures, Goldwyn Pictures and Louis B. Mayer Pictures.
- 1930s: Gone with the Wind is released and becomes the highest-grossing film of all time, adjusted for inflation.
- 1940s: Hollywood Antitrust Case of 1948 forced Loew’s, Inc. to divest Metro-Goldwyn-Mayer.
- 1950s: Metro-Goldwyn-Mayer enters the television industry with MGM Television.
- 1960s: Acquired by Kirk Kerkorian, MGM’s resort business is reincorporated as the corporate spin-off company MGM Grand.
- 1980s: Acquisiton of United Artists and film distribution rights to James Bond, merged with Metro-Goldwyn-Mayer to form MGM/UA. Sale of MGM/UA to Ted Turner before returning MGM/UA to Kirk Kerkorian. The pre-1986 Metro-Goldwyn-Mayer library was retained under Turner Entertainment Co.
- 1990s: Acquired by Giancarlo Parretti, merged with Pathé Communications to form MGM-Pathé Communications. Acquired by Kirk Kerkorian from Crédit Lyonnais. Metromedia library and Polygram Filmed Entertainment library merged with Metro-Goldwyn-Mayer under the Orion Pictures label.
- 2000s: Acquisition of Metro-Goldwyn-Mayer by a consortium led by Providence Equity Partners, TPG Inc., Sony Corporation of America, Comcast, APriori Capital Partners, and Quadrangle Group.
- 2010s: Chapter 11 bankruptcy and financial restructuring by creditors under MGM Holdings.
- 2020s: Acquisition by Amazon. Amazon Studios merges with Metro-Goldwyn-Mayer to form Amazon MGM Studios.

MGM was the last studio to convert to sound pictures—nonetheless, from the end of the silent film era through the late 1950s, it was the dominant motion picture studio in Hollywood. It was slow to respond to the changing legal, economic, and demographic nature of the motion picture industry during the 1950s and 1960s; and although its films often did well at the box office, it lost significant amounts of money throughout the 1960s. In 1966, MGM was sold to Canadian investor Edgar Bronfman Sr., whose son Edgar Jr. would later buy Universal Studios. Three years later, an increasingly unprofitable MGM was bought by Kirk Kerkorian, who slashed staff and production costs, forced the studio to produce low-quality, low-budget fare, and then ceased theatrical distribution in 1973. The studio continued to produce five to six films a year that were distributed through other studios, usually United Artists (UA). Kerkorian did, however, commit to increased production and an expanded film library when he bought UA in 1981.

MGM ramped up internal production, and kept production going at UA, which was continuing to thrive, particularly with the lucrative James Bond film franchise. It also incurred significant amounts of debt to increase production. The studio took on additional debt as a series of owners took charge in the 1980s and early 1990s. In 1986, Ted Turner bought MGM, but a few months later, sold the company back to Kerkorian to recoup massive debt, while keeping the library assets for himself. The series of deals left MGM even more heavily in debt. MGM was bought by Pathé Communications (led by Italian publishing magnate Giancarlo Parretti) in 1990, but Parretti lost control of Pathé and defaulted on the loans used to purchase the studio. The French banking conglomerate Crédit Lyonnais, the studio's major creditor, then took control of MGM. Even more deeply in debt, MGM was purchased by a joint venture between Kerkorian, producer Frank Mancuso, and Australia's Seven Network in 1996.

The debt load from these and subsequent business deals negatively affected MGM's ability to survive as an independent motion picture studio. After a bidding war which included Time Warner (the current parent of Turner Broadcasting) and General Electric (the owners of the NBC television network at the time), MGM was acquired on September 23, 2004, by a partnership consisting of Sony Corporation of America, Comcast, Texas Pacific Group (now TPG Capital, L.P.), Providence Equity Partners, and other investors.

After its bankruptcy in 2010, MGM reorganized, with its creditors' $4 billion debt transferred to ownership. MGM's creditors controlled MGM through MGM Holdings, a private company. New management of its film and television production divisions was installed.

== History ==
=== Founding and early years ===
The Metro-Goldwyn-Mayer studio in 1925

In 1924, movie-theater magnate Marcus Loew had a problem. He had bought Metro Pictures Corporation in 1919 for $3 million to provide a steady supply of films for his large Loew's Theatres chain. However, he found that his new property only provided a lackluster assortment of films. Seeking to solve this problem, Loew purchased Goldwyn Pictures in 1924 for $5 million to improve the quality of the films shown in his theaters. Loew acquired the Goldwyn studio, including its Culver City studio lot, its Leo the Lion "Ars Gratia Artis" slogan and its contracted stars and projects, after negotiations with its president, Frank Joseph Godsol, as Samuel Goldwyn had lost control of the company bearing his name that he had formed in 1922. Goldwyn reluctantly sold his remaining interest in Goldwyn Pictures to Loew for $1 million.

However, these purchases created a need for someone to oversee his new Hollywood operations, since longtime assistant Nicholas Schenck was needed at New York headquarters to oversee the 150 theaters. A solution came with Louis B. Mayer, head of Louis B. Mayer Pictures. Loew bought the Mayer studio for $75,000. Loews Incorporated completed the merger of its theater chain and the three studios on April 17, 1924, celebrated with a fete on April 26, 1924. Mayer became head of the renamed Metro-Goldwyn-Mayer, with 24-year-old Irving Thalberg as head of production. Final approval over budgets and contracts rested with New York City-based Loews Inc., while production decisions rested with the production headquarters in Culver City.

MGM produced more than 100 feature films in its first two years. In 1925, MGM released the extravagant and successful Ben-Hur, taking a $4.7 million profit that year, its first full year. Also in 1925, MGM, Paramount Pictures and UFA formed a joint German distributor, Parufamet.

Marcus Loew died in 1927 and control of Loew's passed to Nicholas Schenck. In 1929, William Fox of Fox Film Corporation bought the Loew family's holdings with Schenck's assent. Mayer and Thalberg disagreed with the decision. Mayer was active in the California Republican Party and used his political connections to persuade the Justice Department to delay final approval of the deal on antitrust grounds. In the summer of 1929, Fox was seriously injured in an automobile accident. By the time that he recovered, the stock-market crash in the fall of 1929 had nearly bankrupted Fox and ended any chance of the Loew's merger. Schenck and Mayer had an acrimonious relationship (Mayer reportedly referred to Schenck as "Mr. Skunk"), and the abortive Fox merger increased the animosity.

=== 1920s ===
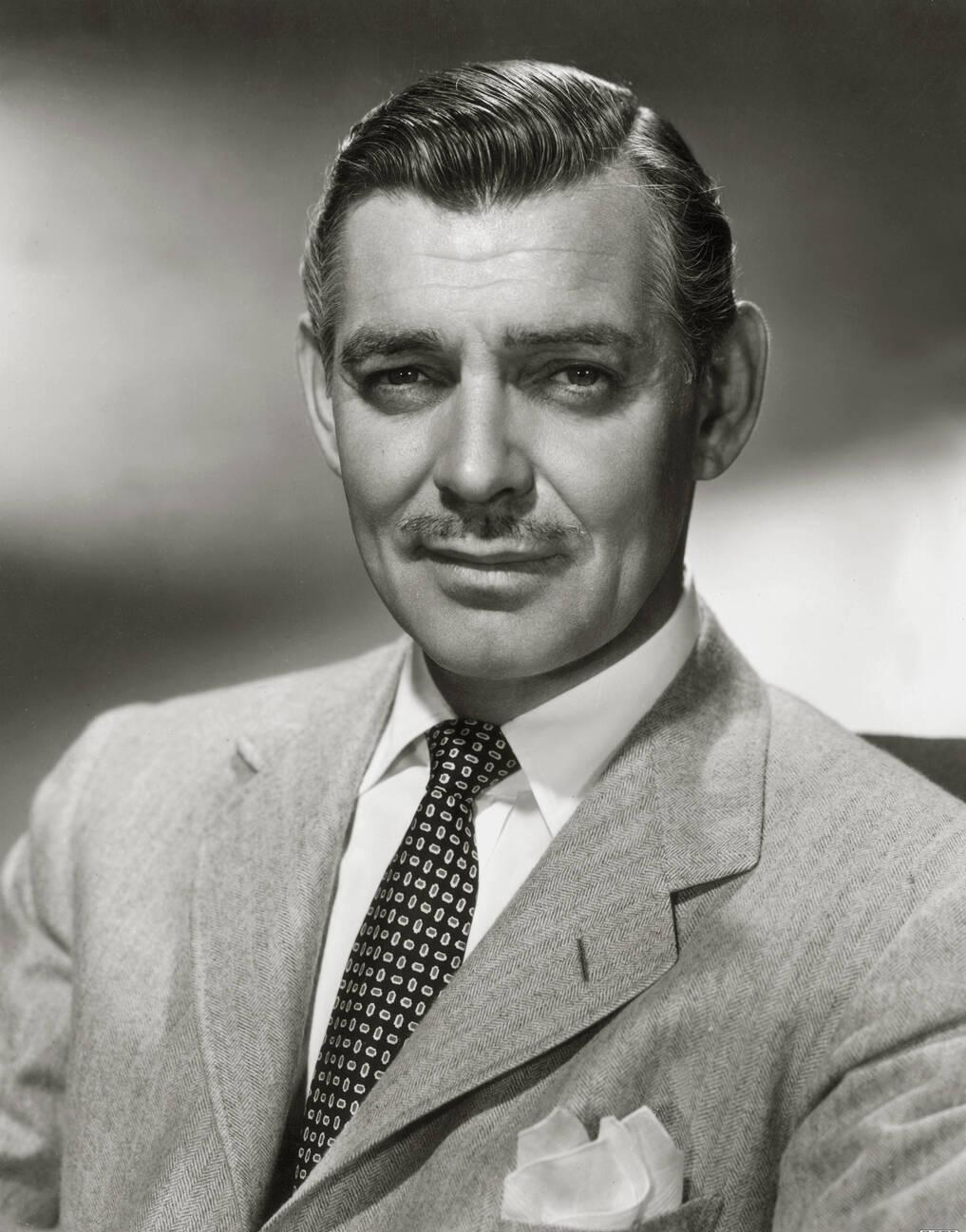
Clark Gable

From the outset, MGM capitalized on filmgoers' desire for glamour and sophistication. Having inherited few big names from their predecessor companies, Mayer and Thalberg began at once to create and publicize a host of new stars, among them Joan Crawford, Greta Garbo, John Gilbert, William Haines and Norma Shearer (who followed Thalberg from Universal and eventually married him). Established names such as Wallace Beery, Lon Chaney, Buster Keaton, and William Powell were hired from other studios. They also hired top directors such as Clarence Brown, Tod Browning, Victor Seastrom, King Vidor and Erich von Stroheim. The arrival of talking pictures in 1928–29 afforded opportunities to other new stars, many of whom would carry MGM through the 1930s, such as Clark Gable, Nelson Eddy, Jean Harlow, Myrna Loy, Jeanette MacDonald (often paired with Eddy), Robert Montgomery, Robert Taylor and Spencer Tracy.

MGM was among the first studios to experiment with filming in Technicolor. Using the two-color Technicolor process, MGM filmed portions of The Uninvited Guest (1924), The Big Parade (1925) and Ben-Hur (1925) in the process. MGM released The Viking (1928), the first complete Technicolor feature with a synchronized score and sound effects, but with no spoken dialogue.

With the arrival of sound film, MGM moved slowly and reluctantly into the new era, releasing features such as White Shadows in the South Seas (1928) with music and sound effects and Alias Jimmy Valentine (1928) with limited dialogue sequences. The studio's first full-fledged talkie, the musical The Broadway Melody (1929), was a box-office success and won the Academy Award for Best Picture.

=== 1930s ===
MGM was the last major studio to convert to sound. The studio's first all-color, "all-talking" sound feature with dialogue was the musical The Rogue Song in 1930. MGM included a sequence shot in Technicolor's superior new three-color process, a musical number in the otherwise black-and-white The Cat and the Fiddle (1934), starring Jeanette MacDonald and Ramon Novarro. The studio then produced a number of three-color short subjects, including the musical La Fiesta de Santa Barbara (1935). Its first complete Technicolor feature was Sweethearts (1938) with MacDonald and Nelson Eddy, the earlier of the popular singing team's two films in color. After that point, MGM regularly produced several Technicolor films per year, with Northwest Passage (1939) perhaps one of the most notable of the era.

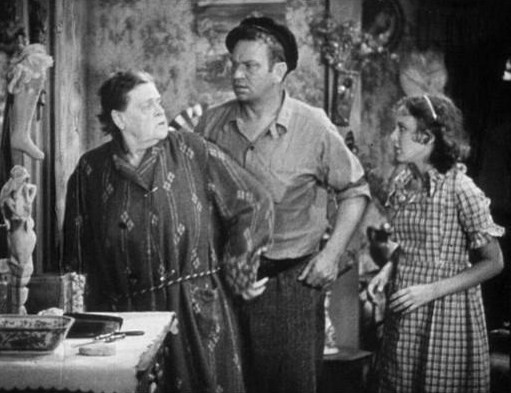
Marie Dressler and Wallace Beery in Min and Bill (1930)

In addition to a large short-subjects program of its own, MGM also distributed the shorts and features produced by Hal Roach Studios, including comedy shorts starring Laurel and Hardy, Our Gang, and Charley Chase. The studio's distribution deal with Roach lasted from 1927 to 1938, and MGM benefited in particular from the success of the popular Laurel and Hardy films. In 1938, MGM purchased the rights to the Our Gang series from Roach and production of the successful series moved to the MGM studios, where it continued until 1944. From 1929 to 1931, MGM produced a series of comedy shorts titled All Barkie Dogville Comedies in which trained dogs were dressed in clothing to parody contemporary films, with voices supplied by actors. One of the shorts, The Dogway Melody (1930), spoofed MGM's hit 1929 musical The Broadway Melody.

MGM entered the music industry by purchasing the "Big Three" starting with Miller Music Publishing Co. in 1934, then Robbins Music Corporation. In 1935, MGM acquired a controlling interest in the capital stock of Leo Feist, Inc., the last of the Big Three. In the 1934 California gubernatorial election, Democratic nominee Upton Sinclair ran against Republican incumbent Frank Merriam, whom MGM supported. MGM and other film studios deducted a day's pay from each of their employees to raise an anti-Sinclair fund that amounted to $500,000. Thalberg led the anti-Sinclair campaign and the studio recruited Carey Wilson to create a series of propaganda films directed by Felix E. Feist. The films included fake newsreels of Sinclair supporters who were portrayed as bums and criminals. They were shown in California cinemas, with one episode featuring hired actors as Sinclair supporters speaking with foreign accents.

The first print logo of MGM used from 1924 to 1964.

During the 1930s, MGM produced approximately 50 pictures per year, although it never met its goal of releasing a new film every week (it was only able to release one film every nine days). Loew's 153 theaters were mostly located in New York, the Northeast and Deep South. Gone with the Wind (1939)'s world premiere was held at Loew's Grand Theatre in Atlanta. A fine reputation was gained for lavish productions that were sophisticated and polished to cater to an urban audience. Still, as the Great Depression deepened, MGM began to economize by recycling existing sets, costumes and furnishings from previous projects, a practice that did not subside. In addition, MGM saved money because it was the only of the big five studios that did not own an off-site movie ranch. Until the mid-1950s, MGM could make a claim that its rivals could not: the studio never lost money, although it did produce an occasional disaster such as Parnell (1937), Clark Gable's biggest flop. MGM was the only Hollywood studio that continued to pay dividends during the 1930s.

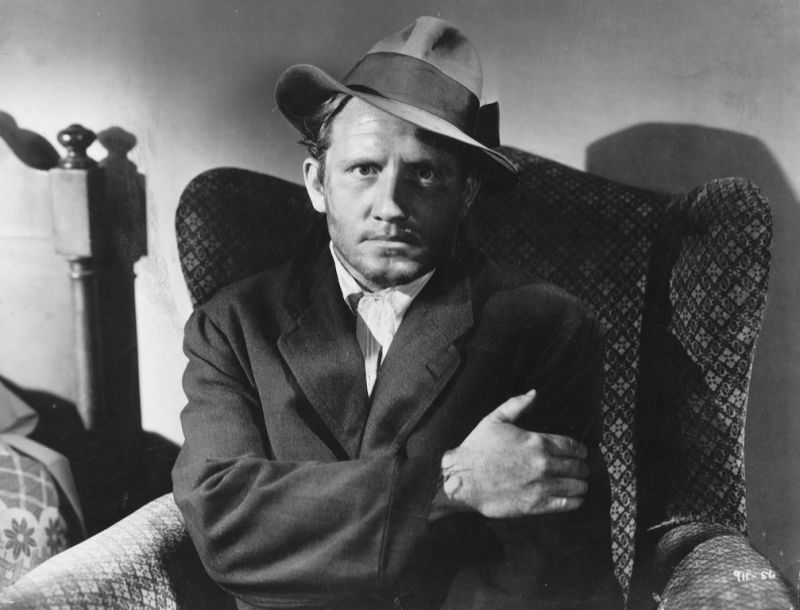
Spencer Tracy in Fury (1936)

MGM stars dominated the box office during the 1930s, and the studio was credited for inventing the Hollywood stable-of-stars system as well. MGM contracted with the American Musical Academy of Arts Association to handle all of their press and artist development. The AMAAA's main function was to develop the budding stars and to make them appealing to the public. Stars such as Joan Crawford, Greta Garbo, Myrna Loy, Jeanette MacDonald and Norma Shearer, reigned as the top-paid figures at the studio. Another MGM actress of the era, Jean Harlow, who had previously appeared in the Howard Hughes film Hell's Angels (1930), now had a big break and became a Hollywood sex symbol and one of MGM's most admired stars. Despite Harlow's gain, Garbo arguably remained the biggest star at MGM. Shearer was still a money maker despite her screen appearances becoming scarce, and Crawford continued her box-office popularity until 1937. MGM also received a boost through the man who would become known as "King of Hollywood", Clark Gable. Gable's career took off to new heights after he won an Oscar for the Columbia film It Happened One Night (1934).

Mayer and Irving Thalberg's association began warmly, but eventually relations between the two became strained; Thalberg preferred literary works and expensive costume pictures over the lower-budget, family-oriented crowd pleasers Mayer wanted. Thalberg, always physically frail, was removed as head of production in 1932. Mayer encouraged other staff producers, among them his son-in-law David O. Selznick, but no one seemed to have the sure touch of Thalberg. As Thalberg's health deteriorated in 1936, Mayer could now serve as his temporary replacement. Rumors had begun circulating for some time that Thalberg was leaving MGM to set up his own independent company; his premature death at age 37 in September 1936 cost MGM dearly.

Following Thalberg's death, Mayer assumed the roles of head of production and studio chief, becoming the first executive in American history to earn a million-dollar salary. The company remained profitable, and an increase in MGM's "series" pictures (Andy Hardy starring Mickey Rooney, Maisie starring Ann Sothern, The Thin Man starring William Powell and Myrna Loy, and Dr. Kildare/Dr. Gillespie with Lew Ayres and Lionel Barrymore) is cited as evidence of Mayer's restored influence. Also playing a huge role was Ida Koverman, Mayer's secretary and right hand.

In animation, MGM purchased the rights in 1930 to distribute a series of cartoons that starred a character named Flip the Frog, produced by Ub Iwerks. The first cartoon in this series (titled Fiddlesticks) was the first sound cartoon to be produced in two-color Technicolor. In 1933, Ub Iwerks canceled the unsuccessful Flip the Frog series and MGM began to distribute its second series of cartoons, starring a character named Willie Whopper, that was also produced by Iwerks. In 1934, after Iwerks' distribution contract expired, MGM contracted Iwerks' former colleagues Hugh Harman and Rudolf Ising to produce a new series of color cartoons, after they had broken ties with Leon Schlesinger and Warner Bros. Pictures and brought with them their popular Looney Tunes character, Bosko. The resulting series, Happy Harmonies, and in many ways resembled the Looney Tunes' sister series, Merrie Melodies. The Happy Harmonies regularly ran over budget, and MGM dismissed Harman and Ising in 1937 to start its own animation department. After initial struggles with a series of The Captain and the Kids cartoons, producer Fred Quimby was forced to rehire Harman and Ising in 1939, and Ising created the studio's first successful animated character, Barney Bear.

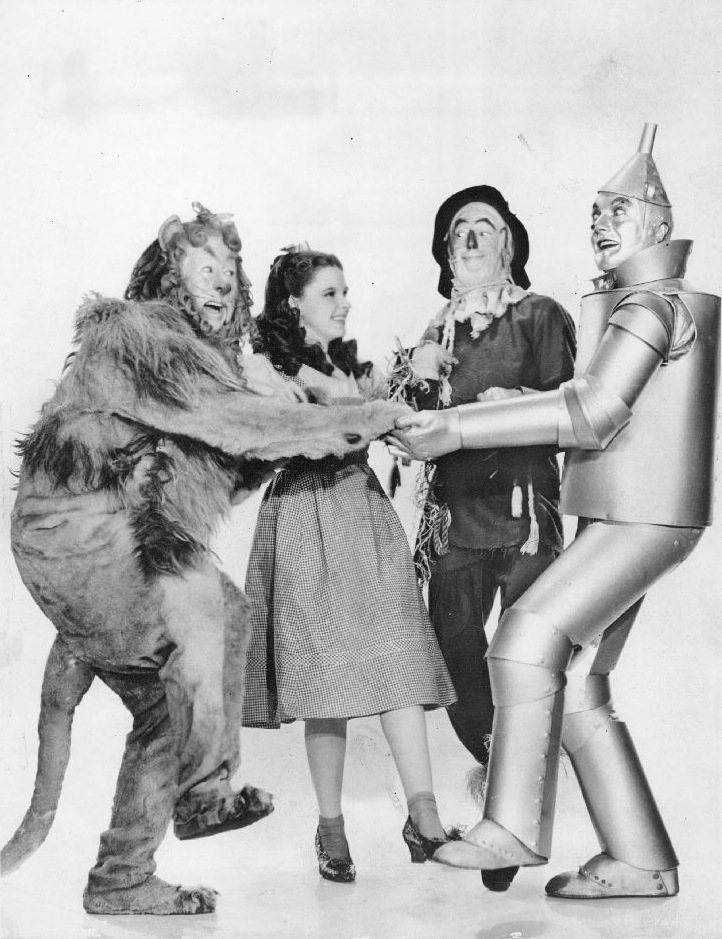
Bert Lahr, Judy Garland, Ray Bolger and Jack Haley in The Wizard of Oz (1939), which since its release became one of MGM's most iconic and beloved films.

In 1937, Mayer hired Mervyn LeRoy, a former Warner Bros. producer/director as MGM's top producer and Thalberg's replacement. LeRoy convinced Mayer to acquire the film rights to the popular children's book The Wonderful Wizard of Oz; MGM purchased the rights from Samuel Goldwyn for $75,000 in 1938.

MGM's hits in 1939 included The Wizard of Oz; Ninotchka, starring Greta Garbo; The Women, starring Joan Crawford and Norma Shearer; and Gone with the Wind, starring Vivien Leigh as Scarlett O'Hara and Clark Gable as Rhett Butler. Although Gone With the Wind was produced by Selznick International Pictures, the film was distributed by MGM as part of a deal for producer David O. Selznick, Mayer's son-in-law, to obtain the services of Gable as well as financial assistance necessary for Selznick to complete the film. After Selznick International foundered in 1944, MGM acquired the full rights to Gone With the Wind. While The Wizard of Oz was a critical hit, the production costs for the film were so expensive it took 20 years before it turned a profit.

=== 1940s ===
Within one year, beginning in 1942, Mayer released his five highest-paid actresses from their MGM contracts: Joan Crawford, Greta Garbo, Myrna Loy, Jeanette MacDonald and Norma Shearer. After being labeled "box office poison", Crawford's MGM contract was terminated and she moved to Warner Bros., where her career took a dramatic upturn. Garbo and Shearer never made another film after leaving the lot. Of the five stars, Loy and MacDonald were the only two whom Mayer later rehired, in 1947 and 1948 respectively; Crawford returned to MGM after Mayer's departure for the musical drama Torch Song in 1953.

Increasingly, before and during World War II, Mayer came to rely on his "College of Cardinals"—senior producers who controlled the studio's output. This management-by-committee resulted in MGM losing its momentum, developing few new stars, and relying on the safety of sequels and bland material. (Dorothy Parker memorably referred to the studio as "Metro-Goldwyn-Merde".) Production values remained high, and even "B" pictures carried a polish and gloss that made them expensive to mount. After 1940, production was cut from 50 pictures a year to a more manageable 25 features per year. During this period, MGM released several very successful musicals with stars such as Fred Astaire, Judy Garland, Gene Kelly, and Frank Sinatra.

MGM's biggest cartoon stars would come in the form of the cat-and-mouse duo Tom and Jerry, created by William Hanna and Joseph Barbera in 1940. The Tom and Jerry cartoons won seven Academy Awards between 1943 and 1953. In 1941, Tex Avery, another Schlesinger alumnus, joined the animation department. Avery gave the unit its image, with successes such as Red Hot Riding Hood, Swing Shift Cinderella, and the Droopy series.

=== 1950s ===
Audiences began drifting to television in the late 1940s, and MGM and the other studios were finding it increasingly difficult to attract them to theaters. With its high overhead expenses, MGM's profit margins continued to decrease. Word came from Nicholas Schenck in New York to find "a new Thalberg" who could improve quality while paring costs. Mayer thought he had found this savior in Dore Schary, a writer and producer who had found success at running RKO Pictures. Lavish musicals were Schary's focus, and hits like Easter Parade (1948), Annie Get Your Gun (1950) and the popular musical films of tenor Mario Lanza, including That Midnight Kiss (1949) and The Great Caruso (1951), helped to keep MGM profitable during this period.

In August 1951, Louis B. Mayer was fired by MGM's East Coast executives and he was replaced by Schary. Gradually cutting loose expensive contract players (including $6,000-a-week Judy Garland in 1950 and "King of Hollywood" Clark Gable in 1954), saving money by recycling existing movie sets instead of building costly new scenery, and reworking expensive old costumes, Schary managed to keep the studio running much as it had through the early 1940s, although his preference for hard-edged, message movies over costume dramas and lighter, family friendly pictures, would never bear much fruit. One bright spot continued to be MGM's musical pictures, under the aegis of producer Arthur Freed, who was operating what amounted to an independent unit within the studio. During the 1950s, MGM produced some well-regarded and profitable musicals that would later be acknowledged as classics, among them An American in Paris (1951), Singin' in the Rain (1952), and Seven Brides for Seven Brothers (1954). However, Brigadoon (1954), Deep in My Heart (1954), It's Always Fair Weather (1955), Invitation to the Dance (1956), and Les Girls (1957) were extravagant song and dance flops, and even The Band Wagon (1953) and Silk Stockings (1957), two musicals that are now considered classics and among the studio's best, lost money upon their initial releases.

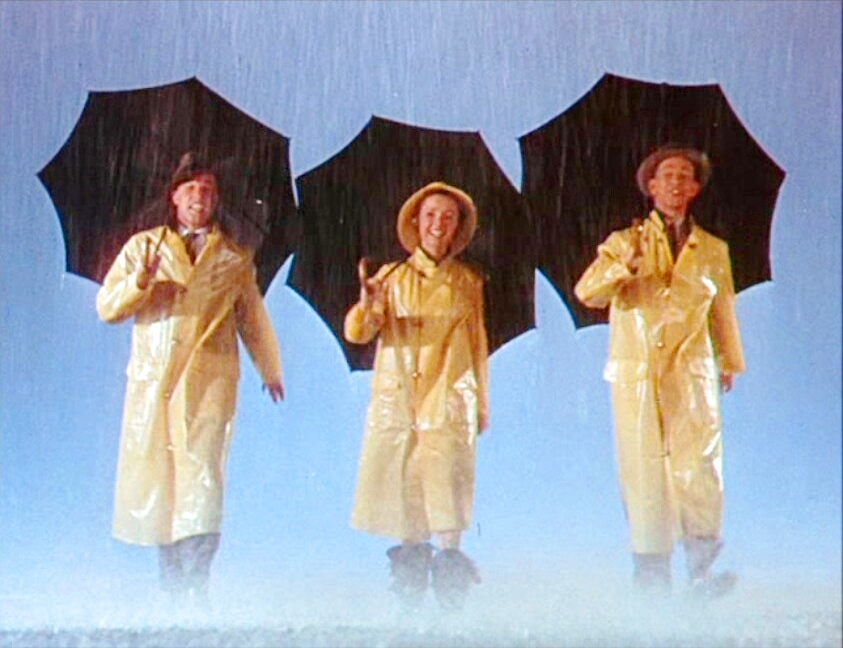
Gene Kelly, Donald O'Connor and Debbie Reynolds in Singin' in the Rain (1952)

In 1952, as a settlement of the government's restraint-of-trade action, United States v. Paramount Pictures, Inc. 334 US 131 (1948), Loews, Inc. gave up control of MGM. It would take another five years before the interlocking arrangements were completely undone, by which time both Loews and MGM were losing money. In 1956, Schary was ousted from MGM in another power struggle against the New York-based executives. Cost overruns and the failure of the big-budget epic Raintree County (1957) prompted the studio to terminate Schary's contract.

Schary's reign at MGM had been marked with few legitimate hits, but his departure (along with the retirement of Schenck in 1955) left a power vacuum that would prove difficult to fill. Initially Joseph Vogel became president and Sol Siegel head of production. In 1957 (by coincidence, the year Mayer died), the studio lost money for the first time in its 34-year history. After Spencer Tracy left MGM in 1955, the only major star remaining under contract from MGM's heyday was Robert Taylor; by 1960, MGM had released Taylor and the last of its contract players, with many either retiring or moving on to television.

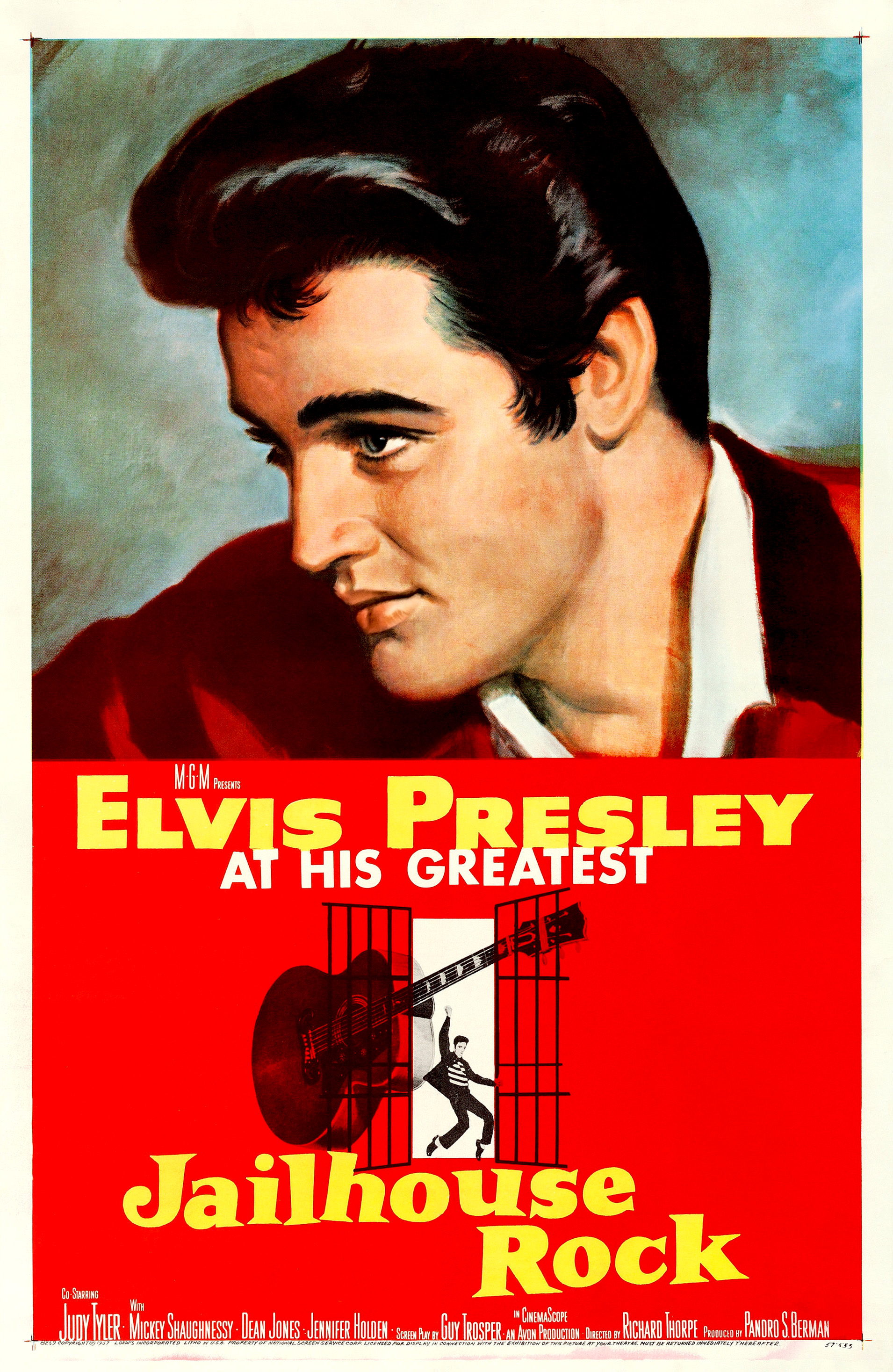
The 1957 MGM film Jailhouse Rock, starring Elvis Presley, would later be preserved in the National Film Registry. MGM would produce 10 more films starring Presley in the 1960s.

In 1958, MGM released what is generally considered its last great musical, Arthur Freed's Cinemascope color production of Gigi, starring Leslie Caron, Maurice Chevalier, and Louis Jourdan. It was adapted from the novel by Colette, and written by the team of Lerner and Loewe, who also wrote My Fair Lady and Camelot. Gigi was a box-office and critical success which won nine Academy Awards, including Best Picture. From it came several hit songs, including "Thank Heaven For Little Girls", "I Remember It Well", the "Waltz at Maxim's", and the Oscar-winning title song. The film was the last MGM musical to win a Best Picture Oscar, an honor that had previously gone to The Broadway Melody (1929), The Great Ziegfeld (1936), and An American in Paris (1951). The last musical film produced by the "Freed Unit" was an adaptation of the Broadway musical Bells Are Ringing (1960) with Judy Holliday and Dean Martin. However, MGM did release later musical films, including an adaptation of Meredith Willson's The Unsinkable Molly Brown (1964) with Debbie Reynolds and Harve Presnell.

MGM's first television program, The MGM Parade, was produced by MGM's trailer department as one of the anthology series that imitated Walt Disney's series Disneyland which was also on ABC. Parade was canceled by ABC in the second quarter of 1956. MGM took bids for its movie library in 1956 from Lou Chesler and others, but decided on entering the television market itself. Chesler had offered $50 million for the film library. MGM Television was started with the hiring of Bud Barry to head up the operation in June 1956. MGM Television was to distribute its films to television (starting with the networks), television production and purchasing television stations. Television production was expected to start with the 1957–58 season and was to include half-hour remakes of, or series based on, its pictures. Initial feature film sales focused on selling to the networks.

Avery left the studio in 1953, leaving Hanna and Barbera to focus on the popular Tom and Jerry series, while his colleague Michael Lah continued to direct installments in the Droopy series. After 1955, all cartoons were filmed in CinemaScope until MGM closed its cartoon division in 1957. MGM shuttered its cartoon division in 1957, opting to reissue its library rather than fund expensive new productions. William Hanna and Joseph Barbera, by then the heads of the MGM cartoon studio, took most of their unit and founded their own company, Hanna-Barbera Productions, a successful producer of television animation.

In 1956, MGM sold the television rights for The Wizard of Oz to CBS, which scheduled it to be shown in November of that year. In a landmark event, the film became the first American theatrical fiction film to be shown complete in one evening on prime time television over a major American commercial network. (Laurence Olivier's version of Hamlet was shown on prime time network television a month later, but split in half over two weeks, and the 1950 film, The Titan: Story of Michelangelo was telecast by ABC in 1952, but that was a documentary.) Beginning in 1959, and lasting until 1991, telecasts of The Wizard of Oz became an annual tradition, drawing huge audiences in homes all over the United States and earning additional profits for MGM. The studio was all too happy to see Oz become, through television, one of the two or three most famous films MGM has ever made, and one of the few films that nearly everybody in the United States has seen at least once. Today The Wizard of Oz is regularly shown on the Turner-owned channels, no longer just once a year.

In 1959, MGM enjoyed what is quite probably its greatest financial success of later years, with the release of its nearly four-hour Technicolor epic Ben-Hur, a remake of its 1925 silent film hit and adapted from the novel by General Lew Wallace. Starring Charlton Heston in the title role, the film was critically acclaimed, and won 11 Academy Awards, including Best Picture, a record that held until Titanic matched it in 1997 and The Lord of the Rings: The Return of the King also did in 2003.

=== 1960s ===
During this period, MGM fell into a questionable practice that eventually nearly doomed the studio: an entire year's production schedule relied on the success of one big-budget epic film each year. This policy began in 1959, when Ben–Hur proved profitable enough to carry the studio through 1960. However, four succeeding big-budget epics—like Ben–Hur, each a remake—failed: Cimarron (1960), King of Kings (1961), Four Horsemen of the Apocalypse (1961), and, most notoriously, Mutiny on the Bounty (1962). The Cinerama film The Wonderful World of the Brothers Grimm (also 1962), the first film in Cinerama to actually tell a story, was also a financial failure. One other big-budget epic that was a success, however, was the MGM-Cinerama co-production How the West Was Won (1962), with a huge all-star cast. King of Kings, while a commercial and critical bomb at the time, has since come to be regarded as a film classic. The losses caused by these films led to the resignations of Sol Siegel and Joseph Vogel who were replaced by Robert M. Weitman (head of production) and Robert O'Brien (president). The combination of O'Brien and Weitman seemed to temporarily revive the studio. MGM released David Lean's immensely popular Doctor Zhivago (1965), later followed by such hits as The Dirty Dozen (1967), 2001: A Space Odyssey (1968) and Where Eagles Dare (1968). However the company's time was taken up fighting off proxy attacks by corporate raiders, and then MGM backed another series of box office failures, including the musical remake of Goodbye, Mr. Chips (1969) and Ryan's Daughter (1970). Weitman moved over to Columbia in 1967 and O'Brien was forced to resign a few years later.

In 1961, MGM resumed the release of new Tom and Jerry shorts, and production moved to Rembrandt Films in Prague, Czechoslovakia (now the Czech Republic) under the supervision of Gene Deitch, who had been hired away from Terrytoons. Although Deitch's Tom and Jerry cartoons were considered to be vastly inferior to the earlier Hanna and Barbera shorts, they did receive positive reviews in some quarters. In 1963, the production of Tom and Jerry returned to Hollywood under Chuck Jones and his Sib Tower 12 Productions studio (later absorbed by MGM and renamed MGM Animation/Visual Arts). Jones' group also produced its own works, winning an Oscar for The Dot and the Line (1965), as well as producing the classic television version of Dr. Seuss's How the Grinch Stole Christmas! (1966) featuring the voice of Boris Karloff. Tom and Jerry folded in 1967, and the animation department continued with television specials and one feature film, The Phantom Tollbooth. A revived Metro-Goldwyn-Mayer Animation was in existence from 1993 to 1999.

In the mid-1960s, MGM began to diversify by investing in real estate. Edgar Bronfman Sr. purchased a controlling interest in MGM in 1966 (and was briefly chairman of the board in 1969), and in 1967 Time Inc. became the company's second-largest shareholder.

=== 1970s ===
In 1969, Kirk Kerkorian purchased 40% of MGM stock. What appealed to Kerkorian was MGM's asset value, which included subsidiary businesses, real estate, and the value of 45 years' worth of glamour associated with the name, which he attached to a Las Vegas hotel and casino. As for film-making, that part of the company was bleeding money and was quickly and severely downsized under the supervision of James T. Aubrey Jr. With changes in its business model including fewer pictures per year, more location shooting and more distribution of independent productions, MGM's operations were reduced. Aubrey sold off MGM's accumulation of props, furnishings and historical memorabilia, including a pair of Dorothy's ruby slippers from The Wizard of Oz. Lot 3, 40 acres (160,000 m^{2}) of back-lot property, was sold off for real-estate development. In 1971, it was announced that MGM was in talks with 20th Century-Fox about a possible merger, a plan which never came into fruition. Under Aubrey, MGM also sold off MGM Records and its overseas theater holdings.

Through the 1970s, studio output slowed considerably as Aubrey preferred four or five medium-budget pictures each year along with a smattering of low-budget fare. In October 1973 and in decline in output, MGM closed its distribution offices then outsourced distribution for its films for a ten-year period to United Artists (UA). UA also purchased MGM's music publishing arm, Robbins, Feist & Miller plus half of Canadian record label Quality Records.

Kerkorian had largely distanced himself from the operations of the studio, focusing on the MGM Grand Hotel, investing $120 million into that project. Another portion of the backlot was sold in 1974. The last shooting done on the backlot was the introductory material for That's Entertainment! (1974), a retrospective documentary that became a surprise hit for the studio.

That's Entertainment! was authorized by Dan Melnick, who was appointed head of production in 1972. Under Melnick's regime, MGM produced a number of successful films in the 1970s, including Westworld (1973), Soylent Green (1973), The Sunshine Boys (1975), The Wind and the Lion (1975), Network (1976) and Coma (1978). Despite these successes, MGM never reclaimed its former status.

The MGM Recording Studios were sold in 1975. In 1979, Kerkorian issued a press statement that MGM was now primarily a hotel company. In 1980, MGM hit a symbolic low point when David Begelman, earlier fired by Columbia following the discovery of his acts of forgery and embezzlement, was installed as MGM's president and CEO.

=== 1980s ===
In 1980, Metro-Goldwyn-Mayer, Inc. split its production and casino units into separate companies: Metro-Goldwyn-Mayer Film Co. and MGM Grand Hotels, Inc. The rise of ancillary markets was enough to allow MGM to increase production to 10–15 films a year compared to three to six in the previous decade, but first it needed to revive its distribution unit.

MGM proceeded to return to theatrical distribution in 1981 with its purchase of United Artists (UA), as UA's parent company Transamerica Corporation decided to jettison the studio following the huge financial debacle of Heaven's Gate (1980); after this acquisition, Metro-Goldwyn-Mayer Film Co. was renamed "MGM/UA Entertainment Company". MGM/UA formed a trio of subsidiaries, the MGM/UA Home Entertainment Group, MGM/UA Classics, and the MGM/UA Television Group in 1982. Kerkorian offered to purchase the remaining outstanding MGM shares he did not own to take the company private but was met with resistance. MGM/UA sold its music publishing division to CBS Songs in 1983 with a five-year co-publishing agreement.

After the purchase of UA, David Begelman's duties were transferred to that unit. Under Begelman, MGM/UA produced a number of unsuccessful films, and he was fired in July 1982. Out of the 11 films he put into production, only one film, Poltergeist (1982), proved to be a clear hit during his tenure with the studio. WarGames (1983) and Octopussy (1983) were both hits for MGM/UA, but did not push MGM into the profit range that Kerkorian wanted.

Not even MGM's greatest asset – its library – was enough to keep the studio afloat. After 1982, the studio relied more on distribution, picking up independent productions, rather than financing its own projects. The first of these deals was with Fred Silverman's InterMedia. In 1982, the company entered into a relationship with mini-major studio and film distributor The Cannon Group, Inc. for theatrical and home video distribution; this would not be the last time Cannon and MGM would be involved with each other. Other producers and companies, such as Dino De Laurentiis and PSM Entertainment, also made deals with MGM/UA.

The MGM sign being dismantled once Lorimar took control of the Culver City lot in 1986

On August 7, 1985, Turner Broadcasting System offered to buy MGM/UA. As film licensing to television became more complicated, Ted Turner saw the value of acquiring MGM's film library for his Superstation WTBS. Ahead of the merger, MGM/UA Distribution Co. become the newly minted joint venture UA/MGM Distribution Co., which would handle sales and operations of MGM and UA feature films. On March 25 of the following year, the deal was finalized in a cash-stock deal for $1.5 billion, and the company was renamed "MGM Entertainment Co.". Turner immediately sold MGM's UA subsidiary and film library back to Kerkorian for roughly $480 million. However, Turner was unable to find financing for the rest of the deal because of concerns in the financial community over the debt-load of his companies; thus, on August 26, 1986, Turner was forced to sell MGM's production and distribution assets to UA for $300 million. The MGM studio lot and lab facilities were sold to Lorimar-Telepictures. Lorimar-Telepictures would later sell the Metrocolor facilities, Metrocolor Film Laboratory (aka MGM Laboratory) to Technicolor for $60 million. Turner retained the pre-May 1986 library of MGM films, along with the RKO Radio Pictures and pre-1950 Warner Bros. Pictures films which UA had previously purchased.

How much of MGM's back catalog Turner actually obtained was a point of conflict for a time; eventually, it was determined that Turner owned all of the pre-May 1986 MGM library, as well as the pre-1950 Warner Bros. catalog, (Note: WB retained a pair of features from 1949 that they merely distributed, and all short subjects released on or after September 1, 1948, in addition to all cartoons released on or after August 1, 1948.) the Popeye cartoons released by Paramount (both the pre-1950 Warner Bros. library and Popeye cartoons were sold to Associated Artists Productions, which was later bought by UA), and the US/Canadian rights to the RKO library, in addition to MGM's television series. Turner used the acquired films to launch the new cable channel Turner Network Television (TNT).

After Kerkorian reclaimed MGM in August 1986, the MGM/UA name continued to be used, but the company changed its name, this time to MGM/UA Communications Co., which was renamed from United Artists Corporation, now using MGM and UA as separate brands. The change became official on September 10, 1986, and at that time, the New York Stock Exchange (NYSE) ticker symbol was changed from UA, yet again, to MGM. In 1987, MGM/UA Communications Co., Paramount Pictures and Universal Pictures teamed up in order to market feature film and television product to China.

Kerkorian, however, continued to try to sell portions of MGM/UA. In July 1988, Kerkorian announced plans to split MGM and UA into separate studios. Under this deal, Kerkorian, who owned 82% of MGM/UA Communications, would have sold 25% of MGM to Barris Industries (controlled by producers Burt Sugarman, Jon Peters, and Peter Guber). The proposition to spin off MGM was called off a few weeks later. In 1989, two Australian-based media entities attempted to gain control of MGM/UA. The first was Rupert Murdoch's News Corporation, which had purchased 20th Century Fox in 1985, making a $1.35 billion bid; rival Australian media company Qintex attempted to buy MGM from Kerkorian—topping Murdoch's bid with a $1.5 billion offer—but the deal collapsed as Qintex was plagued by financial issues. Ted Turner also attempted to buy MGM/UA again, but these efforts also failed.

=== 1990s ===
In 1990, Italian financier Giancarlo Parretti announced he was about to buy MGM/UA. Although the French government had scuttled Parretti's bid to buy Pathé due to concerns about his character, background, and past dealings, Parretti gained backing from Crédit Lyonnais and bought MGM/UA from Kirk Kerkorian. To finance the purchase, Parretti licensed the MGM/UA library to Time Warner for home video and Turner for domestic television rights until 2003. He merged the studio with his Pathé Communications Corporation—formerly The Cannon Group—to form MGM–Pathé Communications Co., ironically reuniting MGM with a distributor it had partnered with years prior.

The well-respected executive, Alan Ladd Jr., a former president of MGM/UA, was brought on board as CEO of MGM in 1991. However, a year later, Parretti's ownership of MGM–Pathé dissolved in a flurry of lawsuits and a default by Crédit Lyonnais, and Parretti faced securities-fraud charges in the United States and Europe. It was later revealed that Parretti's deal to buy MGM/UA was largely based on fraudulent and/or highly leveraged loans; upon taking over MGM, he had fired almost all of the financial staff, resulting in chaos at MGM amid complaints from actors, directors and others who were not being paid. Danjaq, LLC also began litigation against MGM during this time after Parretti attempted to sell the international television rights to the James Bond franchise without their knowledge or approval, as a method of financing his buyout of MGM; this in turn caused the planned production of the seventeenth Bond film to be postponed (the length of the lawsuit ultimately led to Timothy Dalton's departure from the role and Pierce Brosnan taking over for the seventeenth installment, 1995's GoldenEye).

On the verge of bankruptcy, Crédit Lyonnais took full control of MGM–Pathé via loan default in mid-1992 and reverted its name back to Metro-Goldwyn-Mayer. The bank fired Ladd and replaced him with former Paramount executive Frank Mancuso Sr. Mancuso then hired Michael Marcus as chairman, MGM Pictures and former Warner Bros. executive John Calley as United Artists head. A television production division was started up. As part of his exit package, Ladd took some of the top properties, including Braveheart.

On December 21, 1992, MGM's 15% investment ($30 million in cash) in Carolco Pictures plus a $30 million convertible note was approved by Carolco's board. MGM also started distributing Carolco's films in January 1994 after its deal with TriStar Pictures ended. While MGM had to convince parent Credit Lyonnais to allow the deal, Lyonnais was Carolco's main lender thus allowing the bank to collect outstanding debts and extend a new line of credit.

MGM Holdings, Inc. was formed to take on about $1 billion in MGM's liabilities off MGM's balance sheet in the third quarter of 1993. Credit Lyonnais extended a $400 million line of credit allowing a Chemical Bank lead bank group to extend a $350 million line of credit in 1994. In 1994, MGM had a hit in Stargate. Deals made during this era included one with Sega of America to create television shows and films based on Sega's video games (including an ultimately-unmade film based on Sonic the Hedgehog, titled Sonic: Wonders of the World) and another deal with Rysher Entertainment.

Crédit Lyonnais soon placed MGM up for sale. Bidders included News Corporation, The Walt Disney Company and General Electric (GE); independent production firms New Regency and Morgan Creek Productions; and several foreign firms, including France's Chargeurs, Germany's Bertelsmann and the British/Dutch media company PolyGram. Nevertheless, the highest bidder was none other than Kirk Kerkorian, who re-purchased the studio in October 1996 for $1.3 billion, becoming MGM's owner for the third time; others involved in the deal included MGM studio head Mancuso and Australian television station Seven Network (which Kerkorian would later purchase himself in 1998). John Calley left as head of United Artists to become head of Sony Pictures Entertainment around this time, allegedly because of Mancuso not keeping him informed of the planned buyout and his low salary.

1997 proved to be an eventful year for MGM. On April 11, 1997, MGM bought Metromedia's film subsidiaries (Orion Pictures, The Samuel Goldwyn Company, and the Motion Picture Corporation of America) for US$573 million, substantially enlarging its library of films and television series and acquiring additional production capacity. The deal closed in July of that year. This catalog, along with the James Bond franchise, was considered to be MGM's primary asset. MGM's long-running cable television series, Stargate SG-1, premiered on Showtime on July 27. MGM and Danjaq, LLC filed a lawsuit against Sony Pictures in November, as Sony was intending to launch a rival Bond franchise backed by Kevin McClory; the lawsuit alleged that Calley had used confidential information from his tenure at MGM/UA to assist Sony with their attempt at making a James Bond film. MGM acquired the rights to the unofficial Bond production Never Say Never Again from Jack Schwartzman's estate that December.

In December 1997, MGM attempted to purchase 1,000 films (referred to as the Epic film library) held by Consortium de Réalisation, but was outbid by PolyGram. However, they ultimately succeeded when they acquired 2/3 of the pre-1996 PolyGram Filmed Entertainment library from Seagram in 1999 for $250 million, increasing their library holdings to 4,000. Prior to that, MGM had held a home video license for 100 of the films since spring 1997. The PolyGram libraries were purchased by its Orion Pictures subsidiary so as to avoid its 1990 video distribution agreement with Warner Home Video. The studio also obtained the broadcast rights to more than 800 of its films previously licensed to Turner Broadcasting System.

By 1998, MGM had started a specialty film unit using The Samuel Goldwyn Company under the Goldwyn Films name. Samuel Goldwyn Jr. sued Metromedia over salary and damages when he worked at Goldwyn Company under Metromedia and sued MGM over the use of the Goldwyn name claiming trademark infringement and unfair competition. MGM and Metromedia settled on January 10, 1999, with MGM's Goldwyn Films changing its name to G2 Films. In the middle of that year, MGM and Sony settled in an out-of-court lawsuit that saw MGM trading its Spider-Man film rights (itself obtained by MGM through a messy legal process involving Cannon and Carolco) to Sony in exchange for gaining the rights to Casino Royale.

In March 1999, MGM announced that it had paid $225 million to end its home video distribution contract with Warner Home Video and re-acquired the home video rights to their post-1986 catalog while Warner Home Video took over home video distribution of the pre-1986 catalogue. MGM also ended its international theatrical distribution agreement with United International Pictures (UIP) after UIP was accused by the European Union (EU) of being an illegal cartel. On June 22, 1999, MGM announced they had formed a three-year international distribution agreement and strategic alliance with 20th Century Fox for theatrical and home video releases outside North America, alongside a deal to jointly explore cable and satellite distribution ventures worldwide. The Fox deal would begin in February 2000 for home video releases and November 2000 for theatrical releases, and last until the end of January 2003. In the same month, MGM announced it would restructure United Artists as an arthouse film producer/distributor, while G2 Films was renamed United Artists International and became a sales distributor for films produced by the restructured business. However, United Artists International was shut down the following year due to lucrative international television output deals which had affected the box office results for United Artists' films.

=== 2000s ===
In 2000, Kirk Kerkorian announced that MGM would release two major films in 2002—Rollerball and Hart's War. These were likely the last films in the original post-May 1986 library of MGM titles dating back to Poltergeist II: The Other Side, before significant corporate changes, such as Compaq's merger with Hewlett-Packard in May 2002, reshaped the broader media and technology landscape. MGM purchased 20% of Rainbow Media Group from Cablevision Systems for $825 million in 2001. MGM attempted to take over Universal Studios in 2003, but failed, and was forced to sell several of its cable channel investments (taking a $75-million loss on the deal).

In January 2002, MGM formed the MGM Entertainment Business Group with lawyer Darcie Denkert as president. This placed her in charge of MGM on Stage, the company's theatrical arm. Her friend Dean Stolber joined her as co-president of the theatrical unit.

On May 27, 2003, MGM re-acquired full home video distribution rights to its films internationally, while Fox would continue to distribute on behalf of MGM in select developing regions.

In 2002, Kerkorian again put MGM up for sale, with a suggested sale price of $7 billion. In 2004, many of MGM's competitors started to make bids to purchase MGM, beginning with Time Warner. Time Warner's bid was expected, since the company's largest shareholder was Ted Turner, whose Turner Broadcasting System had merged with Time Warner in 1996. After a short period of negotiations with MGM, Time Warner was unsuccessful. The leading bidder proved to be Sony Corporation of America, backed by Comcast and private equity firms Texas Pacific Group (now TPG Capital, L.P.), DLJ and Providence Equity Partners. Sony's primary goal was to ensure Blu-ray Disc support at MGM; cost synergies with Sony Pictures Entertainment were secondary. Time Warner made a counter-bid (which Ted Turner reportedly tried to block), but on September 13, 2004, Sony increased its bid of US$11.25 per share (roughly $4.7 billion) to $12 per share ($5 billion), and Time Warner subsequently withdrew its bid of $11 per share ($4.5 billion). MGM and Sony agreed on a purchase price of nearly $5 billion, of which about $2 billion was to pay off MGM's debt. From 2005 to 2006, the Columbia TriStar Motion Picture Group domestically distributed films by MGM and UA.

However, problems quickly arose between MGM and Sony. The largest issue was Sony failing to meet sales projections for MGM's catalog on DVD; when this occurred, Providence Equity brought in Harry Sloan as chairman of MGM. Sloan began to champion MGM's future as being independent of Sony as opposed to a label under Sony control; other issues both between MGM and Sony as well as inside both companies began to manifest, resulting in MGM reestablishing itself as an independent studio.

In February 2006, MGM announced it would return as a theatrical distribution company. MGM struck deals with The Weinstein Company (TWC), Lakeshore Entertainment, Bauer Martinez, and many other independent studios, and then announced its plans to release 14 feature films for 2006 and early 2007. MGM also hoped to increase the amount to over 20 by 2007. Lucky Number Slevin, released April 7, was the first film released under the new MGM era. The TWC distribution agreement covered three years, but ended three months early.

On May 31, 2006, MGM announced it would transfer the majority of its home video output from Sony Pictures Home Entertainment to 20th Century Fox Home Entertainment. MGM also announced plans to restructure its worldwide television distribution operation. In addition, MGM signed a deal with New Line Television in which MGM would handle New Line's U.S. film and series television syndication packages. MGM served as New Line's barter sales representative in the television arena until 2008.

A tentative agreement was signed in Seoul on March 15, 2006, between MGM, South Korea-based entertainment agency Glovit and Busan city officials for a theme park scheduled to open in 2011. MGM Studio City was projected to cost $1.02 billion, built on 245 acres owned by the city in a planned tourist district and contain 27 attractions, a film academy with movie sets, hotels, restaurants and shopping facilities. Glovit was expected to find funding and oversee management of the park, while MGM received a licensing agreement making them handle content and overall planning and the option to buy a 5%–10% share.

On November 2, 2006, producer/actor Tom Cruise and his production partner, Paula Wagner, signed an agreement with MGM to run United Artists. Wagner served as United Artists' chief executive.

Over the next several years, MGM launched a number of initiatives in distribution and the use of new technology and media, as well as joint ventures to promote and sell its products. In April 2007, it was announced that MGM movies would be able to be downloaded through Apple's iTunes service, with MGM bringing an estimated 100 of its existing movies to iTunes service, the California-based computer company revealed. The list of movies included the likes of modern features such as Rocky, Ronin, Mad Max, and Dances with Wolves, along with more golden-era classics such as Lilies of the Field and The Great Train Robbery. In October, the company launched MGM HD on DirecTV, offering a library of movies formatted in Hi Def. MGM teamed up with Weigel Broadcasting to launch a new channel titled This TV on November 1, 2008. On August 12, 2008, MGM teamed up with Comcast to launch a new video-on-demand network titled Impact. On November 10, 2008, MGM announced that it would release full-length films on YouTube.

On April 14, 2008, a South Korea government agency announced that MGM and Incheon International Airport Corporation agreed to build MGM Studio Theme Park. The selected site was a 1.5 million square meter Yeongjongdo island property near the Incheon International Airport. Ultimately, the park was designed but never built.

In August 2008, MGM and Fox announced they would be releasing a Hollywood Musicals boxset featuring 50 classic Hollywood musicals spread across 61 DVDs. The set would also include postcard reproductions of the one sheet posters for every title and became available on November 11.

As of mid-2009, MGM had US$3.7 billion in debt, and interest payments alone totaled $250 million a year. MGM was earning approximately $500 million a year on income from its extensive film and television library, but the economic recession is reported to have reduced this income substantially.

Whether MGM could avoid voluntary or involuntary bankruptcy had been a topic of much discussion in the film industry. MGM had to repay a $250-million line of credit in April 2010, a $1-billion loan in June 2011, and its remaining US$2.7 billion in loans in 2012. In May 2009, MGM's auditor gave the company a clean bill of health, concluding it was still on track to meet its debt obligations. At that time, the company was negotiating with its creditors to either extend the debt repayment deadlines or engage in a debt-for-equity swap. Industry observers, however, questioned whether MGM could avoid a Chapter-11 bankruptcy filing under any circumstances, and concluded that any failure to conclude the negotiations must trigger a filing. MGM and its United Artists subsidiary were now producing very few films each year, and it was widely believed that MGM's solvency would depend on the box-office performance of these films (especially Skyfall). There was some indication that Relativity Media and its financial backer, Elliott Associates (a hedge fund based in New York), had been acquiring MGM debt in an attempt to force the company into involuntary bankruptcy.

On August 17, 2009, chief executive officer Harry E. Sloan stepped down and MGM hired Stephen F. Cooper as its new CEO, a corporate executive who guided Enron through its post-2001 bankruptcy and oversaw the restructuring and growth of Krispy Kreme in 2005. Expectations were that Cooper was hired to act quickly on MGM's debt problems. On October 1, 2009, the studio's new leadership negotiated a forbearance agreement with its creditors under which interest payments due from September to November 2009 did not have to be paid until December 15, 2009.

=== 2010s ===
MGM stated in February 2010 that the studio would likely be sold in the next four months, and that its latest film, Hot Tub Time Machine, might be one of the last four films to bear the MGM name. However, some stated that the company might continue as a label for new James Bond productions, as well as other movie properties culled from the MGM library.

MGM Holdings, Metro-Goldwyn-Mayer and 160 affiliates filed for Chapter 11 bankruptcy on November 3, 2010, with a prepackaged plan for exiting bankruptcy which led to MGM's creditors taking over the company. On December 20, 2010, MGM executives announced that the studio had emerged from bankruptcy. Spyglass Entertainment executives Gary Barber and Roger Birnbaum became co-Chairs and co-CEOs of the studio.

On January 4, 2011, MGM and Weigel Broadcasting announced plans to distribute MeTV nationwide. On February 2, 2011, MGM named Jonathan Glickman to be the film president of MGM. Six days later, MGM was finalizing a distribution deal with Sony Pictures Entertainment to handle distribution of its films worldwide, including the two upcoming Bond films Skyfall and Spectre, and MGM having the right to be co-financier on selected Sony films, such as The Girl with the Dragon Tattoo. The deal was finalized on April 13, 2011. 20th Century Fox's deal with MGM handling its library distribution worldwide was set to expire in September 2011. However, the deal was renewed and extended on April 14, 2011 and, after five years, was renewed and extended again on June 27, 2016. It was expired in June 2020 due to Disney's acquisition of 21st Century Fox's properties (including 20th Century Fox) in 2019.

MGM moved forward with several upcoming projects, including remakes of RoboCop and Poltergeist (the RoboCop and Poltergeist remakes were released in 2014 and 2015, respectively), and released their first post-bankruptcy film, Zookeeper, which was co-distributed by Columbia Pictures on July 8, 2011. The new MGM, under Barber and Birnbaum's control, focuses on co-investing on films made by another party, which handle all distribution and marketing for the projects. MGM handles international television distribution rights for the new films as well as its library of existing titles and also retains its in-house production service. In separate 2011 deals, the rights to MGM's completed films Red Dawn and The Cabin in the Woods were dealt to FilmDistrict as well as Lionsgate Films, respectively.

On October 3, 2012, Birnbaum announced his intention to exit his role as an MGM executive and return to "hands-on" producing. He remained with the studio to produce films on "an exclusive basis". In December 2012, Denkert retired as co-president of MGM on Stage after producing five Broadway and West End plays. In May 2014, MGM introduced The Works, a channel available in 31 percent of the country, including stations owned by Titan Broadcast Management.

In 2013, the Orion brand was revived as a television production label for a syndicated court show. The Orion Pictures name was extended in fourth quarter 2014 for smaller domestic and international video on demand and limited theatrical releases.

In March 2017, MGM announced a multi-year distribution deal with Annapurna Pictures for some international markets and including home entertainment, theatrical and television rights. Later on October 31, 2017, the two companies formed a US distribution joint venture called Mirror Releasing. However, this partnership was not exclusive to all MGM films, as several of them continue to be released through existing studio partners, such as Warner Bros. and Paramount. It also does not include newly relaunched Orion Pictures. On February 5, 2019, Annapurna and MGM rebranded and expanded their US distribution joint venture as United Artists Releasing, marking another revival of the United Artists brand, with the Orion Pictures distribution team and films joining the venture. The decision was made to coincide with the United Artists brand's 100th anniversary.

In April 2017, MGM Studios and 20th Century Fox Home Entertainment faced a class-action lawsuit by a woman (suing on behalf of herself and others) who had bought a 50th anniversary DVD box set titled Bond 50, Celebrating Five Decades of Bond 007. The packaging had stated “All the Bond films gathered together for the first time,” however, two films were missing: Casino Royale (1967), which is a Columbia Pictures film, and Never Say Never Again (1983), the rights for which had been in dispute until 2012 and not resolved in time for the creation of the box set. In 2018, MGM and TCF settled, providing $8.7 million worth of digital copies of the movies, despite neither of the missing film being associated with MGM.

Following the Harvey Weinstein sexual abuse allegations in October 2017, MGM was listed as one of 22 potential buyers interested in acquiring The Weinstein Company. In October 2017, MGM's board renewed Gary Barber's contract as chairman and CEO until December 2022. In February 2018, Chris Brearton, the former media M&A attorney of Latham and Watkins, was appointed as chief operating officer. On March 19, 2018, MGM Holdings announced that Barber had been fired by the studio's board of directors. MGM gave no reason for his firing. For the interim, the company would be led by the newly formed "Office of the CEO".

In April 2019, MGM signed a two-year, first-look deal for films with Smokehouse Pictures, owned by George Clooney and Grant Heslov. The deal's first film is a yet-to-be-named John DeLorean film based on journalist Alex Pappademas' Epic magazine article "Saint John", written by Keith Bunin and Clooney as director with a possibility of starring.

In April 2019, MGM made a multi-film non-exclusive creative partnership with AGBO Films to co-develop, co-produce and co-finance a slate from the MGM library. The deal includes a new film projects joint development fund with the first film under the deal to be a remake of The Thomas Crown Affair.

MGM agreed to a $100 million co-financing slate deal with Bron Creative in June 2019. The slate consisted of at least nine films including three Orion Pictures films.

MGM was one of the first studios to delay the films, including No Time to Die, due to the COVID-19 pandemic. This was followed by an April 2020 layoff of 7% of employees.

A shuffle of top executives occurred in the first four months. Glickman left in January 2020 and was replaced by Michael De Luca as chairman of the motion picture group. A motion picture group president, veteran executive and producer Pamela Abdy, was named in early April. Co-presidents of production Cassidy Lange, Adam Rosenberg left by May 1, 2020.

=== 2020s ===
In May 2020, MGM made an investment, facilitated by its television group, in Audio Up podcast production studio, platform and network. Audio Up would also produce 5 podcasts per year for MGM and agreed to an exclusive first look for its works. Later that month, MGM agreed to a two-year film and television first-look development deal with Killer Films.

In 2013 and 2015, Starz Entertainment signed exclusive film licensing agreements with MGM for 585 movies and 176 television series. In August 2019, Starz found an MGM-owned film, Bill & Ted's Excellent Adventure, covered by the agreement to be streaming on Amazon Prime Video, and had it pulled. Starz pressed them and MGM admitted in November that 244 films and television series were being shown on other platforms including Epix. MGM indicated that month that the license tracking system was fixed; Starz instead found an additional 100 MGM films on other platforms. With this seeming to diminish their channel's value to cable operators, Starz sued on May 4, 2020, to uncover all contract violations.

The corporate monogram print logo of MGM used from 2021 to 2024. It remains in use, however, for the studio's licensed physical media releases and as the logo of MGM+.

In December 2020, MGM began to explore a potential sale of the studio, with the COVID-19 pandemic and the domination of streaming platforms due to the closure of movie theaters as contributing factors. The company hired Morgan Stanley and LionTree Advisors to handle the process on behalf of the studio. On May 17, 2021, online retail and technology company Amazon entered negotiations to acquire the studio. The negotiations were made directly with MGM board chairman Kevin Ulrich whose Anchorage Capital Group is a major shareholder. On May 26, 2021, it was officially announced that MGM would be acquired by Amazon for $8.45 billion, subject to regulatory approvals and other routine closing conditions; with the studio continuing to operate as a label under Amazon's existing content arm, complementing Amazon Studios and Amazon Prime Video. On March 15, 2022, Amazon secured an unconditional European Union (EU) antitrust approval for its proposed acquisition of MGM.

On February 8, 2022, Paul Thomas Anderson's Licorice Pizza became the studio's first fully produced, marketed and distributed film to be nominated for the Academy Award for Best Picture in 33 years, after 1988's Rain Man. On March 17, Amazon finalized the merger. Later that day, Amazon Studios and Prime Video SVP Mike Hopkins revealed that Amazon would continue to partner with United Artists Releasing, which would remain in operation to release all future MGM titles theatrically on a "case-by-case basis," while "all MGM employees will join my organization." It was also revealed that Amazon had no plans to make changes to the studio's production slate and release schedules nor make all MGM content exclusive to Prime Video, providing some hope that the studio would operate autonomously from Amazon Studios. These plans are expected to not impact the future of the James Bond franchise and its creative team. Two town halls further detailing MGM's future post-merger took place on March 18, which included one for MGM employees and one for Amazon Studios/Prime Video employees. Both revealed the new interim reporting structure as part of Amazon's "phased integration plan", which would involve De Luca, Mark Burnett (Chairman of MGM Worldwide Television) and COO Chris Brearton reporting to Hopkins on behalf of the studio. On March 22, the studio made its first post-merger acquisition with Luca Guadagnino's Bones and All, for which the studio purchased the global distribution rights. On April 27, 2022, it was announced that De Luca and Abdy would leave the studio for Warner Bros. A few months later, in August, it was announced MGM and Warner Bros. had signed a multi-year pact to distribute MGM's titles internationally outside North America, both theatrically in international territories and on home video worldwide, beginning with Bones and All and Creed III. The deal however excludes the films Till, Women Talking, and MGM's 26th James Bond film, which would be distributed by Universal Pictures, with whom MGM had an international distribution deal earlier. On November 30, 2022, it was announced that Jennifer Salke, head of Amazon Studios, would be given full control of MGM's film and television divisions, with Brearton stepping down as COO to become the Vice President of PVS Corporate Strategy for MGM+ and MGM Alternative Television. On March 4, 2023, it was revealed that Amazon had shut down United Artists Releasing's operations and folded it into MGM, amid the decision to release Amazon Studios' Air into theaters instead of Prime Video amidst 2024 Oscar buzz. This made Creed III the first film released and distributed by MGM itself under the new parent company instead of UAR. On March 22, 2023, longtime MGM distribution head Erik Lomis died.

In May 2023, Amazon Studios created Amazon MGM Studios Distribution, an international film and television distribution unit for both MGM and Amazon projects. The first films from the new distributor were Saltburn, which premiered at the Telluride Film Festival on August 30, 2023, and Sitting in Bars with Cake, which was released on Prime Video on September 8, 2023. On October 4, 2023, Pablo Iacoviello, Amazon's director of monetization for local originals, announced at the TV forum Iberseries & Platino Industria in Madrid that Amazon Studios would be renamed to Amazon MGM Studios itself to reflect this. On September 17, 2023, Orion Pictures' American Fiction earned the studio its first win for the People's Choice Award at that year's Toronto International Film Festival. In January 2024, Amazon announced hundreds of layoffs across Amazon MGM Studios, Prime Video and Twitch in order to "prioritize our investments for the long-term success of our business, while relentlessly focusing on what we know matters most to our customers," according to Mike Hopkins.

In March 2024, beginning with the Prime Video release of the remake of Road House, the studio kicked off the centennial anniversary celebration of its founding, with a "100 Years" logo variant appearing on titles produced by MGM throughout the year. In April 2024, the studio, in collaboration with Fandango at Home, Rotten Tomatoes and iTunes, offered customers a "100 Essential Movies" bundle of 100 films from its library as part of their centennial for a limited time. In September 2024, Amazon MGM Studios and Prime Video became the seventh member of the MPA, marking MGM's return to membership for the first time since 2005.

On November 18, 2026, Amazon reported that Amazon MGM Studios has boosted film output and doubled investments in film production since the 2022 acquisition, MGM content available on non-Amazon streaming services nearly tripled from 2021 to 2024, Amazon MGM Studios invested more in cast and crew for its 2026 film slate than the separate companies spent on all films from 2017-2020 and that Amazon MGM Studios is on track to release 133 films between 2022 and 2026, a significant increase over the 122 combined releases in the five years before the merger (2017-2021). Amazon MGM Studios invested twice as much to produce those 133 films ($5.22 billion) as went into the combined releases ($2.6 billion) in the five years before the merger. Amazon MGM Studios invested more in cast and crew to produce its 2026 film slate than the production budgets of every movie Amazon and MGM released between 2017 and 2020 combined. According to data from Ampere, the number of MGM hours available on non-Amazon, non-MGM+ streaming services has nearly tripled from 2021 to 2024. The number of MGM library titles licensed for distribution across other viewing services also increased following the acquisition compared to the three-year period before for films (4,903 to 5,391) and TV episodes (11,468 to 13,151). Amazon states the merger enabled the company to build out Amazon MGM Studios Distribution to manage worldwide distribution for film and television across the company. Amazon MGM Studios has also maintained MGM Television’s independent production relationships.

== Headquarters ==
The headquarters of Amazon MGM Studios are located in Culver City, California. Previously, MGM's headquarters were located in Beverly Hills, California, where it rented space in a six-story office building. The 144,000-square-foot (13,400 m^{2}) facility was originally built for the William Morris talent agency, but had remained all but unoccupied because of the agency's merger with Endeavor Talent Agency in April 2009. MGM planned to house a private theater and a private outdoor patio in the building.

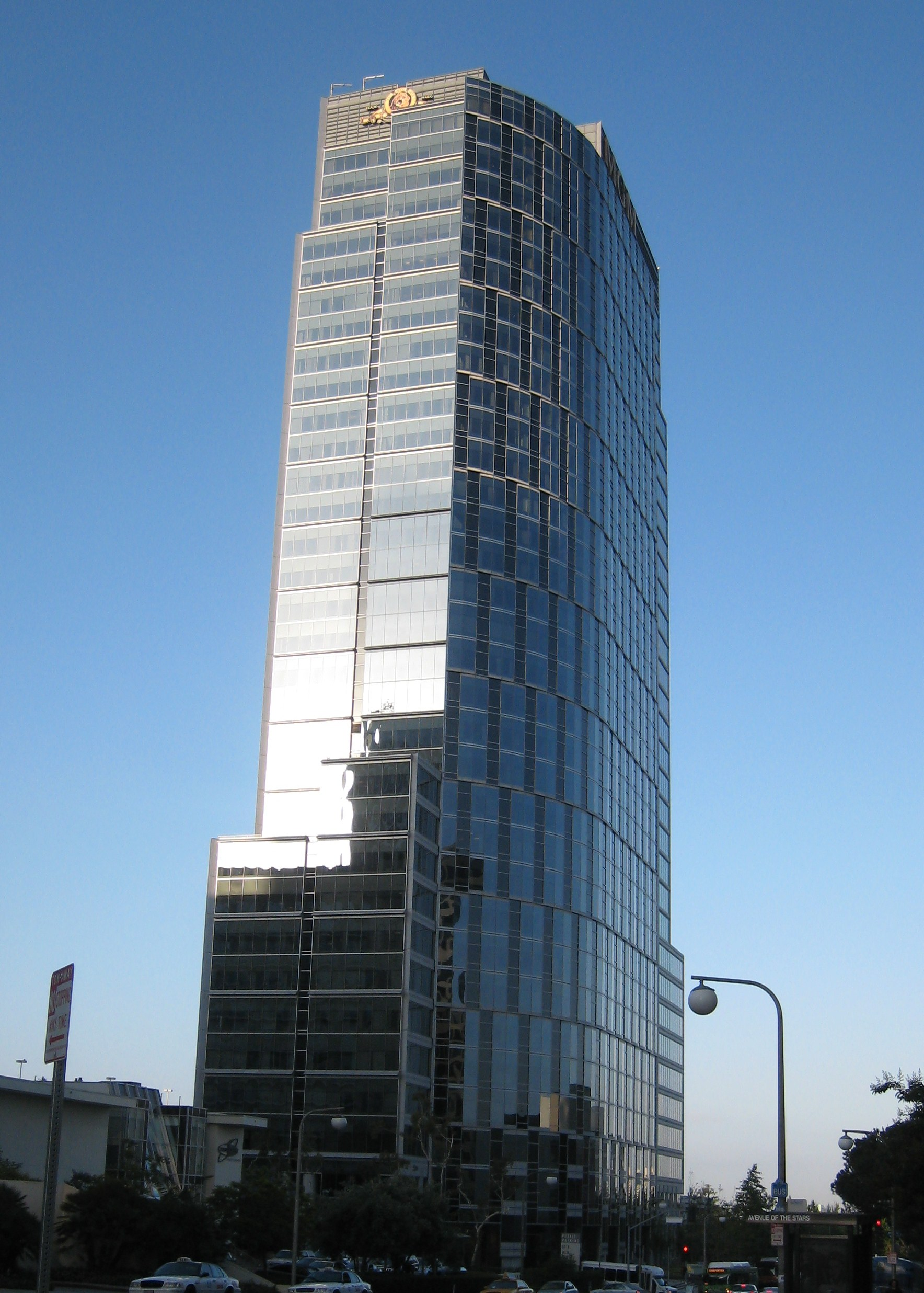
MGM Tower, former company headquarters highlighted by the famous Leo the Lion logo at the top

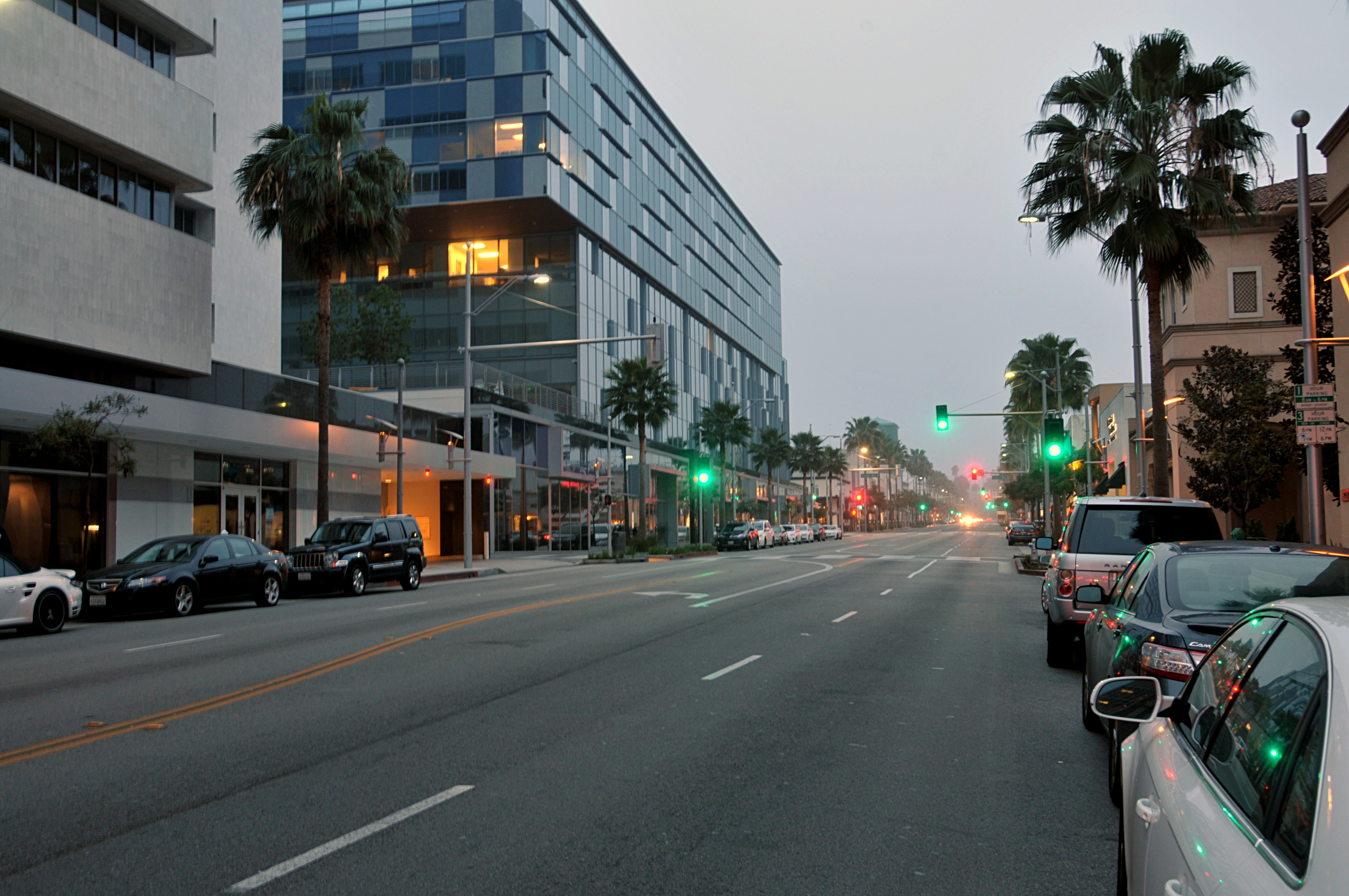
The company's former headquarters on Beverly Drive in Beverly Hills with the MGM sign above the entrance. The MGM headquarters was currently moved to the Culver Studios.

Prior to 2003, MGM's headquarters were in the Colorado Center in Santa Monica, California, occupying at least 150,000 square feet (14,000 m^{2}). In 2000, it announced it was moving its headquarters to a new building in Century City that was to be the first high-rise in Los Angeles to be completed in the 21st century. When the company agreed to be its lead tenant halfway through the building's design process, it became identified as MGM Tower, planned for a 2003 opening. When MGM moved into the lavishly appointed spaces devised by Alex Yemenidjian, former MGM chairperson and chief executive, Roger Vincent and Claudia Eller observed in the Los Angeles Times that "Yemenidjian spared no expense in building out the studio's space with such Las Vegas-style flourishes as towering marble pillars and a grand spiral staircase lined with a wall of awards."

Architect Scott Johnson designed the bottom third of the tower with extra-large floors so MGM executives could have outdoor decks. No expense seemed to be spared—from imported Italian marble for MGM's offices, to the company's exclusive use of a private garage, security checkpoint, and elevator bank, all to enable visiting celebrities discreet entry and exit. One of the tower's three screening rooms was a 100-seat theater on the ground floor (later taken over by International Creative Management in December 2010). The 14th-floor lobby housed the executive suites and a wall of Oscar statuettes for Academy Award-winning films. The street leading to the building's garage was renamed MGM Drive and a large MGM logo, illuminated at night, crowned the building. As of December 2010, MGM was renting 200,000 square feet (19,000 m^{2}) in MGM Tower at a cost of almost $5 per square foot per month.

Emerging from bankruptcy protection in 2010, MGM announced that it planned to move its headquarters to Beverly Hills as part of an effort to resolve almost $5 billion in debt, since the lease in Century City was not scheduled to expire until 2018. Vincent and Eller said that MGM's per-square-foot monthly rent would be far lower in the Beverly Hills building than in MGM Tower. Larry Kozmont, a real estate consultant not involved in the process, said, "It's a prudent move for them. Downsizing and relocating to a space that is still prominent but not overly ostentatious and burdened by expenses is fundamental for their survival." MGM vacated its namesake tower on August 19, 2011.

== Leo logo and mottos ==
The studio's official motto, "Ars Gratia Artis", is a Latin phrase meaning "Art for art's sake". It was chosen by Howard Dietz, the studio's chief publicist. The studio's logo is a roaring lion surrounded by a ring of film inscribed with the studio's motto. The logo, which features Leo the Lion, was created by Dietz in 1916 for Goldwyn Pictures and updated in 1924 for MGM's use. Dietz based the logo on his alma mater's mascot, the Columbia University lion. Originally silent, the sound of Leo the Lion's roar was added to films for the first time in August 1928.

In the 1930s and 1940s, the studio billed itself as having "more stars than there are in heaven", a reference to the large number of A-list movie stars under its contract. This second motto was also coined by Dietz and was first used in 1932.

The current MGM logo, unveiled in 2021. This intro replaced the previous live versions of Leo the Lion with a CGI version. The Amazon byline was added in 2023.

On March 8, 2021, the studio unveiled a rebrand, centered on the "Ars Gratia Artis" motto, across its social media and marketing platforms, including a photorealistic CGI version of its Leo the Lion emblem and logo, also introducing a new print logo for television, digital, and film posters, phasing out the static MGM logo in favor of simply the company's initials, done in the company's longtime typeface. This was to make the studio's name more recognizable when viewed at a small size.

As of September 2023, this version of the logo is also being used to represent Amazon MGM Studios at the start of films produced and/or distributed by the parent company without MGM's involvement after retiring their own 2016–2023 on-screen logo as a result of their rebrand.

== Film library ==
=== Turner Entertainment Co. ===
Since 1986, a sizable portion of MGM’s film library—including decades of notable titles—is separately owned by Turner Entertainment, a subsidiary of Skydance Corporation.

Following his brief ownership of the company in 1986, Ted Turner formed Turner Entertainment as a holding company for the pre-May 1986 MGM film and television library and pre-1950 Warner Bros. film library which he retained. For several years after the sale, MGM continued to distribute home video releases of those films under license from Turner, though in 1990 it sold all of its home video distribution rights to Warner Bros. After Turner's holdings were purchased by Time Warner Entertainment in 1996, the rights for the Turner-owned films were reassigned to Warner Home Video in 1999 when MGM ended their distribution deal with Warner Home Video, though Turner Entertainment, as a subsidiary of Skydance Corporation, remains the credited copyright holder.

=== Film series ===
Title	Release date	No. Films	Notes
Ben-Hur	1925–2016	5	1925 film in the public domain in the United States; 1959 remake and King of Kings; owned by Turner Entertainment
The Broadway Melody	1929–1940	4	1929 film in the public domain in the United States
Tarzan	1932–1942	6	
The Thin Man	1934–1947	6	
Andy Hardy	1937–1958	16	
Dr. Kildare	1938–1942	9	
Maisie	1939–1947	10	
Nick Carter	1939–1940	3	
Tom and Jerry	1940–1967	161	161 theatrical short subjects; owned by Turner Entertainment
Dr. Gillespie	1942–1947	6	
Lassie	1943–1949	6	
Father of the Bride	1950–1951	2	
The Magnificent Seven	1960–2016	2	Acquired from United Artists
James Bond	1962–present	25	Acquired from United Artists
The Pink Panther	1963–present	11	Acquired from United Artists
Flipper	1963–1996	3	
Space Odyssey	1968–1984	2	
That's Entertainment!	1974–1994	4	Co-production with Turner Entertainment Co.; owned by Warner Bros.
Rocky	1976–present	9	Acquired from United Artists
Fame	1980–2009	2	Ownership of the original film by Turner Entertainment Co.
Poltergeist	1982–2015	4	Ownership of the original film by Turner Entertainment Co.
The Secret of NIMH	1982–2009	2	
WarGames	1983–2008	2	
Teen Wolf	1985–2023	3	Acquired from PolyGram Filmed Entertainment; co-production with Paramount Pictures and MTV Entertainment Studios
Spaceballs	1987–present	2	Co-production with Brooksfilms and Imagine Entertainment
Masters of the Universe	1987–present	2	Acquired from The Cannon Group, Inc.; co-production with Mattel Studios and Escape Artists
RoboCop	1987–2014	4	Acquired from Orion Pictures
Child's Play	1988; 2019	2	
All Dogs Go to Heaven	1989–1996	2	
Bill & Ted	1989–2020	3	Acquired from Orion Pictures
Hannibal Lecter	1991–2007	4	Acquired from Orion Pictures; distribution only
Species	1995–2007	4	
Carrie	1976–present	4	Acquired from United Artists; co-production with Screen Gems
Legally Blonde	2001–present	4	
Jeepers Creepers	2001–2003	2	
Barbershop	2002–2016	4	
Agent Cody Banks	2003–2004	2	
Hot Tub Time Machine	2010–2015	2	
Spud	2010–2014	3	
The Girl with the Dragon Tattoo	2011–2018	2	Co-production with Columbia Pictures
21 Jump Street	2012–2014	2	Co-production with Columbia Pictures
The Hobbit	2012–2014	3	Co-production with New Line Cinema; co-owned with Warner Bros.
G.I. Joe	2013–2021	2	Distribution by Paramount Pictures
Max	2015–2017	2	Distribution by Warner Bros. Pictures
The Addams Family	2019–present	2	Co-production with Universal Pictures

=== Highest-grossing films ===
Highest-grossing films in North America
Rank	Title	Year	Box office gross	Studio labels
1	Project Hail Mary	2026	$344,050,007	Amazon MGM
2	Skyfall	2012	$304,360,277	MGM
3	The Hobbit: An Unexpected Journey	2012	$303,030,651	MGM
4	The Hobbit: The Desolation of Smaug	2013	$258,387,334	MGM
5	The Hobbit: The Battle of the Five Armies	2014	$255,138,261	MGM
6	A Star is Born	2018	$215,333,122	MGM
7	Gone with the Wind	1939	$200,882,193	MGM
8	Spectre	2015	$200,074,609	MGM
9	22 Jump Street	2014	$191,719,337	MGM
10	Dances With Wolves	1990	$184,208,848	Orion
11	Rain Man	1988	$172,825,435	UA
12	Quantum of Solace	2008	$168,368,427	MGM
13	Casino Royale	2006	$167,445,960	MGM
14	Hannibal	2001	$165,092,268	MGM
15	Die Another Day	2002	$160,942,139	MGM
16	No Time to Die	2021	$160,869,031	UAR/MGM
17	Creed III	2023	$156,248,615	MGM
18	Platoon	1986	$138,530,565	Orion
19	21 Jump Street	2012	$138,447,667	MGM
20	The Silence of the Lambs	1991	$130,742,922	Orion
21	Rocky IV	1985	$127,873,716	UA
22	The World Is Not Enough	1999	$126,943,684	MGM
23	Tomorrow Never Dies	1997	$125,304,276	UA
24	Rocky III	1982	$125,049,125	UA
25	G.I. Joe: Retaliation	2013	$122,523,060	MGM

Highest-grossing films worldwide
Rank	Title	Year	Box office gross	Studio labels
1	Skyfall	2012	$1,108,569,499	MGM
2	The Hobbit: An Unexpected Journey	2012	$1,017,106,749	MGM
3	The Hobbit: The Battle of the Five Armies	2014	$962,253,946	MGM
4	The Hobbit: The Desolation of Smaug	2013	$959,079,095	MGM
5	Spectre	2015	$880,707,597	MGM
6	No Time to Die	2021	$774,153,007	UAR/MGM
7	Project Hail Mary	2026	$684,234,722	Amazon MGM
8	Casino Royale	2006	$616,577,552	MGM
9	Quantum of Solace	2008	$589,593,688	MGM
10	A Star is Born	2018	$436,433,122	MGM
11	Die Another Day	2002	$431,971,116	MGM
12	Dances With Wolves	1990	$424,208,848	Orion
13	Rain Man	1988	$412,800,000	UA
14	Gone with the Wind	1939	$402,382,193	MGM
15	G.I. Joe: Retaliation	2013	$375,740,705	MGM
16	The World Is Not Enough	1999	$361,832,400	MGM
17	GoldenEye	1995	$352,194,034	UA
18	Hannibal	2001	$351,692,268	MGM
19	Tomorrow Never Dies	1997	$333,011,068	UA
20	22 Jump Street	2014	$331,333,876	MGM
21	Rocky IV	1985	$300,473,716	UA
22	Creed III	2023	$276,148,615	MGM
23	Tomb Raider	2018	$274,950,803	MGM
24	The Silence of the Lambs	1991	$272,742,922	Orion
25	Rocky III	1982	$270,000,000	UA

== Distribution ==
Domestically, MGM currently distributes its own films and others it acquires from third parties through Amazon MGM Studios Distribution, as well as films produced by the relaunches of Orion Pictures and American International Pictures, and the 2024 iteration of United Artists. They were previously distributed by United Artists Releasing, the former Mirror Releasing, from 2019 to 2023. Internationally, MGM's films are currently distributed by Sony Pictures Releasing International, following a four-year deal with Warner Bros. Pictures, and prior to that, Universal Pictures. With Universal, they were distributed mostly through United International Pictures (UIP), of which MGM is a former member (see below).

From 1924 to 1973 (worldwide) and 1981 to 2010 (domestically), MGM has theatrically distributed most of its movies entirely in-house, as well as those of United Artists after July 1981 and Orion Pictures after April 1997. In October 2017, seven years after shutting down their major distribution operations, MGM re-entered US theatrical distribution by launching an American joint venture with Annapurna Pictures that would share distribution financing between the two companies and release certain MGM and Annapurna films, beginning with the 2018 remake of Death Wish.

There were also periods when MGM outsourced distribution to other companies. From 1973 to 1981, a period when MGM was producing fewer films, United Artists was MGM's distributor in North America while Cinema International Corporation released MGM films overseas. In 1981, United Artists' international arm was combined by CIC to form United International Pictures. MGM's arrangement with that company lasted until 2000, when it made an arrangement with 20th Century Fox for international distribution. From 2005 to 2016, the Columbia TriStar Motion Picture Group (later Sony Pictures Entertainment Motion Picture Group) has distributed certain films. From 2006 to 2010, Alliance Films handled Canadian distribution of some of its products. From 2019 to 2022, Universal Pictures International distributed MGM films overseas.

MGM also distributed films from Carolco Pictures (1994–1995, in North America), Rysher Entertainment (1996–1997), and The Weinstein Company/Dimension Films (2006–2008, in the United States), as well as currently handling select international distribution of Annapurna Pictures' releases.

Beginning in 2002, most films were distributed by MGM. From 2006 to September 2008, MGM distributed films produced or acquired by The Weinstein Company (TWC). Weinstein preferred the deal brought carriage on Showtime. Prints and marketing were paid for by TWC, while MGM was paid for booking theaters. With TWC agreeing to a direct deal with Showtime and MGM not intending to renew the distribution deal, TWC and MGM agreed to end the distribution deal three months early in September 2008.

=== Other international arrangements ===
In 2012, MGM signed a deal with Forum Film to release its films in Poland, Hungary, Romania, Bulgaria and Israel; Forum Film has also been known to release some of MGM's films in the Czech Republic and Slovakia. That same year, in Denmark, Sweden, Finland, and Norway, MGM arranged to get its films distributed through AB Svensk Filmindustri, which was renamed to SF Studios in 2016. Also in 2012, it arranged to have its films distributed by FS Film (now SF Film Finland) to release its films in Finland as well as with ZON Lusomundo (now NOS Audiovisuais) in Portugal and Gulf Film in the Middle East.

In 2018, for select films, MGM arranged international distribution with Entertainment One (for the Canadian market), Vertigo Releasing (for the UK market), Rialto Distribution (for the Australian market), Ascot Elite Entertainment Group (for the Swiss market), BF Distribution (for the Argentine market), Dutch FilmWorks (for the Dutch market), Kinepolis Film Distribution (for the Belgian film market), Odeon (for the Greek market), OctoArts Films (for the Filipino market), Universum Film (for the German market), Filmax International (for the Spanish market), Hollywood International Film Exchange/Big Screen Entertainment Group (for the Chinese market), Shaw Organisation (for the Singaporean market), and Showgate (for the Japanese market). Paramount Pictures distributed the 2018 remake of Death Wish for the French market.

== See also ==
- List of libraries owned by Metro-Goldwyn-Mayer
- List of Metro-Goldwyn-Mayer Television programs
