= Leo Feist =

American composer and publisher of popular music (1869–1930)

- Leo Feist; Photo from Music Trade Review, 1922
- Born: January 3, 1869
- Died: June 21, 1930 (aged 61)
- Occupation: Executive
- Spouse: Bessie Meyer (m. 1904)
- Children: 3
- Relatives: Felix F. Feist (brother); Felix E. Feist (nephew); Raymond E. Feist (great-nephew)

Leopold Feist (January 3, 1869, New York City or Mount Vernon, New York – June 21, 1930, Mount Vernon, New York) was a pioneer in the popular music publishing business. In 1897, Feist founded and ran a music publishing firm bearing his name. In the 1920s, at the height of the golden age of popular music, his firm was among the seven largest publishers of popular music in the world. The company used the motto "You can't go wrong, with any FEIST Song."

== Career ==
Feist started his career as a corset salesman, with songwriting as a hobby. He had trouble selling his music to a publisher, so he formed his own publishing house. He was successful in selling his own music through the new venture, and turned it into a full business, Leo Feist, Inc.

=== Leo Feist, Inc. ===
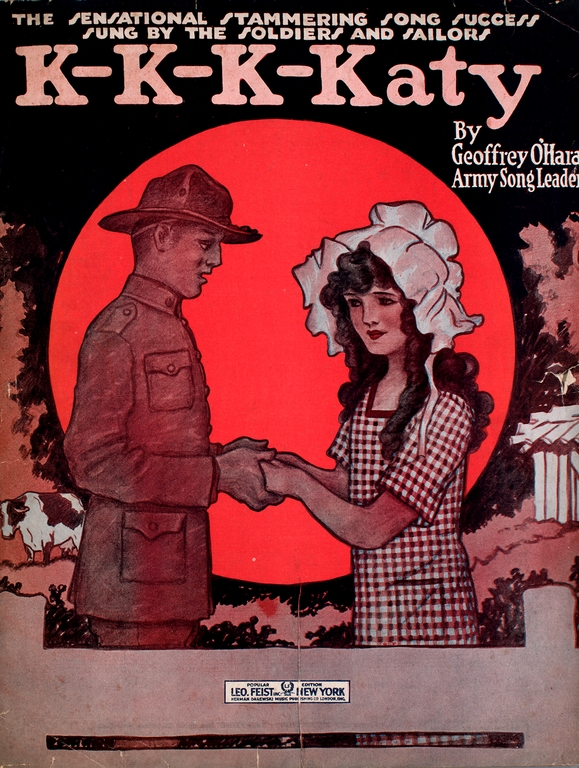
K-K-K-Katy, cover of the original publication by Leo Feist in New York, 1918

The first publishing hit was Smokey Mokes in 1895. Feist marketed his publications very aggressively, even by Tin Pan Alley standards. He maintained offices in most major cities, each with a regional manager (in Boston, for instance, his delegate was Billy Lang). Favored employees were rewarded with corporate largesse; in 1914, for instance, selected managers gathered in Atlantic City, where it was said that "money flowed like water." Feist also set up branch offices in several locations abroad, increasing the popularity of American music in Europe and Australia.

As evidence of the size of his firm, Leo Feist, Inc., was one of seven defendants named in a 1920 Sherman antitrust suit brought by the US Justice Department for controlling 80% of the music publishing business. The 7 were Consolidated Music Corporation, Irving Berlin, Inc., Leo Feist, Inc., T.B. Harms & Francis, Day & Hunter, Inc., Shapiro, Bernstein & Co., Inc., Waterson, Berlin & Snyder, Inc., and M. Witmark & Sons, Inc.

"My Blue Heaven," written by Walter Donaldson (music) in collaboration with George Whiting (lyrics), became the biggest song in the history of Leo Feist, Inc. Gene Austin recorded it (Victor 20964), selling over five million copies, and Eddie Cantor plugged it in vaudeville and in the Ziegfeld Follies of 1927. It sold over five million copies of sheet music.

==== Mergers and reacqusition ====
Feist bought competitors Balmer & Weber (1907), and the Morse Music Co. (1915).

In 1929, Feist negotiated a merger of his company into the National Broadcasting Company (NBC), along with rival sheet music publisher Carl Fischer Music, which was also a family-owned business. (Note: Fischer's obituary indicates that the merger involved his company and Harms, which appears to refer to Harms, Inc. Harms was bought by Warner Brothers in 1929, and not RCA/NBC, and the obituary writer may have confused Harms and Fischer, since they both were merged in separate transactions in 1929.) The two merged units operated somewhat independently, with the former owners acting as principals and as board members of the new holding company. The combined company was capitalized at $6.6 million and did $3.6 million of business annually at the time. Feist died less than a year later, and the two families took their two companies private again less than two years after that, buying them back from NBC.

The company published about 2,000 titles in its founder's lifetime.

In 1935, five years after the death of the founder, and three years after the company was taken private again, Metro-Goldwyn-Mayer (MGM) acquired a controlling interest in the capital stock of Leo Feist, Inc.

In mid-1973, MGM consolidated the offices of its four music publishers, sold Robbins-Feist & Miller (known as Big 3), and Hastings. The same year, it sold the Big 3 to United Artists (UA). In 1981, MGM acquired UA and formed MGM/UA Communications Co. In 1983, MGM/UA sold its music publishing business to CBS Records. CBS then sold the print music arm, Big 3 Music, to Columbia Pictures.

== Personal life ==
In an unannounced ceremony, Feist married Bessie Meyer on June 24, 1904. They had three children: Leonard S. Feist (1911–1996), Nathan Feist (1905–1965), and Milton Feist (1907–1975).

- Leonard Feist was a music publisher, copyright expert, and advocate for the music publishing industry. He was still in college at the time of his father's death. He was married in 1937 to Mary Regensburg. He ran the classical music publishers Century Music, Mercury Music, and Associated Music Publishers. Leonard was leader of industry trade group National Music Publishers Association, and an officer of the National Music Council, the National Academy of Popular Music, and the Copyright Society of the United States. He led efforts at copyright and royalty legal reforms in the United States. He died November 18, 1996.
- Nathan Feist was a publisher and advertising executive. He was a member of his father's firm at the time of its sale to NBC. He was born April 17, 1905, in New York City, and died there December 2, 1965. Nathan lived in Mount Vernon for 50 years, and was married to Beatrice Friedman in 1934; they had two children, Richard and Marilyn.
- Milton Feist, also known by his Hebrew name, Meir, was a rabbi, scholar, teacher, publisher, and translator of books and opera. He contracted polio when he was four years old, and was disabled thereafter, using a wheelchair for the rest of his life. Milton was also a member of the firm at the time of its sale to NBC. Rabbi Meir "Milton" Feist became attracted to Orthodox Judaism in his youth, through rabbis Joshua Mereminsky and Mendel Zaks, two scholars with familial and religious association with the Chofetz Chaim and his Radun yeshiva. As a result, Feist was involved in the translation and printing of books written by the Chofetz Chaim. Feist spent the last four years of his life studying Torah full-time at Beth Medrash Govoha, in Lakewood, NJ. Milton also ran Mercury Music Corp.

=== Death ===
Feist died at home in Mount Vernon, New York, on June 21, 1930.

=== Relatives ===
Leopold Feist had several other well-known relatives in the entertainment industry. His brother, Felix F. Feist (Jul 15, 1883 – Apr 15, 1936), was a sales executive at Metro-Goldwyn-Mayer. His nephew, Felix Ellison Feist (Feb 28, 1910 – Sep 2, 1965), was a film and television director. His great-nephew is fantasy author Raymond E. Feist.
