= Amazon MGM Studios =

American film and television and distribution company

- Logo since 2023

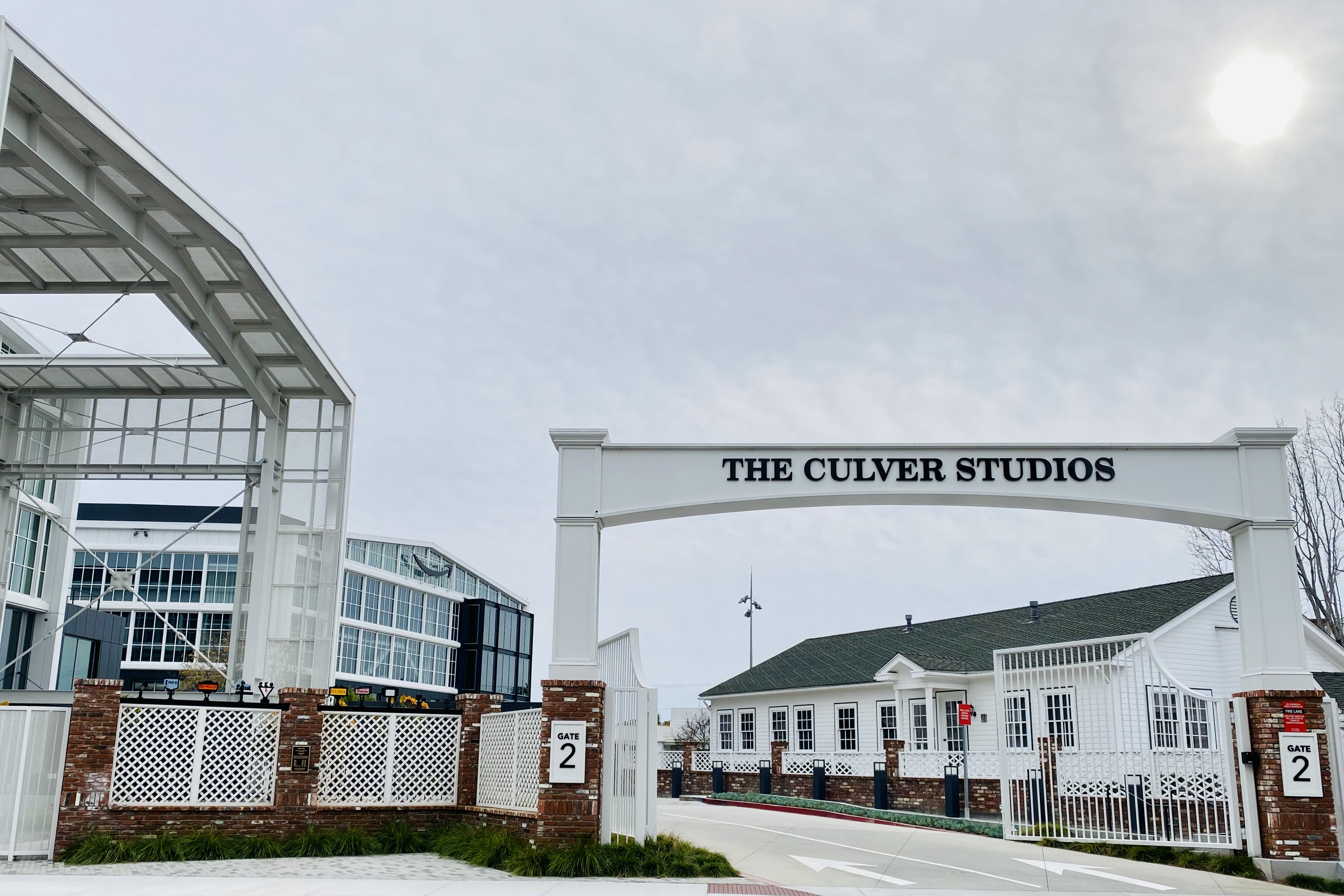
- The Culver Studios, Amazon MGM Studios' headquarters in Culver City, California
- Formerly: Amazon Studios (2010–2023)
- Type: Subsidiary
- Predecessor: MGM Holdings
- Founded: November 16, 2010; 16 years ago
- Headquarters: Culver Studios, Culver City, California
- Key people: Mike Hopkins (head of Prime Video and Amazon MGM Studios); Buddy Marini (head of Amazon MGM Studios Japan); Courtenay Valenti (head of film: streaming and theatrical); Julie Rapaport (head of film: production & development); Alana Mayo (head of film: production & development); Peter Friedlander (head of global TV)
- Parent: Amazon
- Divisions: MGM Television; MGM Alternative Television; Amazon MGM Studios Distribution
- Subsidiaries: Metro-Goldwyn-Mayer; United Artists; Orion Pictures
- Website: mgm.com amazonmgmstudios.com (press releases)

Amazon MGM Studios is an American film and television production and distribution company and the flagship namesake subsidiary of Amazon. Founded as Amazon Studios on November 16, 2010, the company adopted its current name on October 3, 2023, after its merger with MGM Holdings, which Amazon had acquired the year prior.

Productions from the studio are primarily distributed through theaters and Amazon's own streaming media service, Amazon Prime Video.

Alongside Amazon Prime Video, the company constitutes one half of Amazon's membership in the Motion Picture Association (MPA), which it joined in October 2024.

== History ==
=== Formation and early success (2010–2021) ===
Logo of Amazon Studios, used from 2010 to 2019

Scripts for television and films used to be submitted online to Amazon and read by staff; however, the website states they no longer accept submissions. Amazon aimed to review submitted scripts within 90 days (although the process may be longer). If a project was chosen for development, the writer was paid $10,000. If a developed script was selected for distribution as a full-budget movie, the creator was paid $200,000; if it was selected for distribution as a full-budget series, the creator was paid $55,000 as well as "up to 5 percent of Amazon's net receipts from toy and t-shirt licensing, and other royalties and bonuses."

In 2008, Amazon expanded into film production, producing the film The Stolen Child with 20th Century Fox. In July 2015, Amazon announced it had acquired Spike Lee's new film, Chi-Raq, as its first Amazon Original Movie.

In 2010, Amazon Studios started allowing people to submit screenplays, which Amazon Studios and its customers would vote on. The top scriptwriters were told that they would earn cash prizes. This was named as "the scientific studio" by Jeff Bezos. This program stopped eight years later as submitted scripts were of low quality.

Amazon Studios also released its only comic-book series, Blackburn Burrow, in 2012 as a free download. It contained a survey allowing Amazon to collect feedback to determine whether or not it was worthwhile to make the comic into a film.

Amazon Studios had received more than 10,000 feature screenplay submissions as of September 2012 and 2,700 television pilots as of March 2013; 23 films and 26 television series were in active development as of March 2013. In late 2016, it reorganized its film division into Prime Movies.

Logo of Amazon Studios, used from 2019 to 2023

On July 27, 2017, it was announced that, starting with the December 2017 release Wonder Wheel, Amazon Studios would be its own self-distributing company. Previously, Amazon Studios had relied on multiple external studios to distribute their projects. The company also acquired global television rights to The Lord of the Rings for $250 million. However, Amazon still has external distribution clients outside of the United States, such as Elevation Pictures in Canada, as well as Warner Bros. and StudioCanal in the United Kingdom and France.

In April 2018, Amazon Studios announced that they would no longer accept open submissions of screenplays.

=== Acquisition of MGM and rebranding (2021–present) ===
In May 2021, Amazon (parent company of Amazon Studios) entered negotiations to acquire Metro-Goldwyn-Mayer (MGM). On May 26, 2021, it was announced that the studio would be acquired by Amazon for $8.45 billion, subject to regulatory approval, continuing to operate as a label alongside Amazon Studios and Amazon Prime Video. Amazon will continue to partner with United Artists Releasing (MGM and Annapurna Pictures' joint distribution venture), which will continue to operate and release MGM titles theatrically "on a case-by-case basis."

In August 2021, it was reported that Steven Prinz signed an overall television deal and a first-look deal with the studio. In September 2021, it was reported that Brian Otaño had signed a deal with Amazon Studios. Also in September, Eddie Murphy had signed a first-look film deal with Amazon Studios.

In January 2022, Westbrook signed a multi-year first-look deal with Amazon Studios. That same month, Amazon Studios signed a ten-figure deal with 87North Productions.

In November 2022, it was announced that Jennifer Salke, in addition to Amazon Studios, will be given full control of MGM's film and television divisions, with Brearton stepping down as COO to become the Vice President of PVS Corporate Strategy for MGM+ and MGM Alternative Television.

In December 2022, Intrepid Pictures signed a multi-year overall television deal with Amazon Studios. The studio is one of the largest employers in Culver City with roughly 2,700 staffing their headquarters and production facilities. In January 2023, Critical Role Productions signed a multi-year overall television and first-look film deal with Amazon Studios.

In March 2023, it was announced in response to the decision to release Air into theaters worldwide instead of Prime Video, that Amazon had shut down United Artists Releasing and folded the distributor's operations into MGM, making Creed III the first film to be distributed by the latter studio itself under Amazon's ownership. Also in March, Joe Quesada signed an exclusive first-look deal with Amazon Studios, and the studio also signed a multi-year first-look film deal with Imagine Entertainment.

In May 2023, Amazon Studios created Amazon MGM Studios Distribution, an international television sales unit for Amazon and MGM projects. On October 4, Pablo Iacoviello, the studio's director of monetization for local originals, announced at the TV forum Iberseries & Platino Industria in Madrid that Amazon Studios would merge with MGM Holdings and would be renamed to Amazon MGM Studios itself to reflect this. This would also result in the on-screen 2016 animated Amazon Studios logo designed by Monster Creative being retired, with all film productions going forward, as of September 2023, opening with the 2021 MGM Leo the Lion logo designed by Baked Studios.

In December 2023, Amazon MGM Studios secured a deal with Games Workshop, the creator of Warhammer 40,000, to adapt its characters and stories for film and television. The agreement, involving British actor Henry Cavill as an executive producer and actor, enables Amazon MGM to produce Warhammer 40,000 themed movies and TV shows. In January 2024, Amazon announced hundreds of layoffs across Amazon MGM, Prime Video and Twitch in order to "prioritize our investments for the long-term success of our business, while relentlessly focusing on what we know matters most to our customers," according to Mike Hopkins. In March 2024, beginning with the Prime Video release of the remake of Road House, Amazon MGM Studios marked the centennial anniversary of the founding of MGM with a "100 Years" logo variant appearing on all films produced and released by the studio throughout the year.

In April 2024, Amazon MGM, in collaboration with Fandango at Home, Rotten Tomatoes and iTunes, offered customers a "100 Essential Movies" bundle of 100 films from the MGM library as part of the studio's centennial for a limited time. That same month, they signed a three-year first-look deal with Jake Gyllenhaal's Nine Stories Productions banner, for which they will have a first look on films the latter company intends to produce for theatrical and streaming releases, including a film adaptation of the musical Fun Home.

In July 2024, the company announced the revival of United Artists after more than a decade of dormancy as a label, entering a multi-year partnership with Scott Stuber, former Chief of Film at Netflix and Vice Chairman at Universal Pictures. Under the deal, Stuber will produce films under his newly formed production company for United Artists, with Stuber involved with all projects released by the freshly revived banner.

In late-August 2024, Amazon MGM announced its plan to sell its unscripted production studio MGM Alternative as an independent company along with subsidiaries Evolution Media and Big Fish Entertainment.

In September 2024, it was announced that Amazon MGM and Prime Video would join the Motion Picture Association (MPA) as its seventh member starting October 1, the second non-studio to do so after Netflix in 2019; this would also mark a return to the MPA for MGM after it lost membership in 2005 following a buyout led by Sony Pictures.

In February 2025, Amazon MGM and Michael G. Wilson and Barbara Broccoli of Eon Productions announced its intentions to form a joint venture to manage the franchise rights to James Bond. Following the closing of the transaction, Amazon MGM would have full creative control over the Bond film franchise. The deal cost Amazon MGM an estimated $1 billion for creative control, on top of what Amazon originally paid for MGM. According to reports, Bezos himself directed Amazon MGM executives to "get rid" of Broccoli "no matter how much it costs."

In March 2025, it was announced that Jennifer Salke would step down from her role at the helm of Amazon MGM to become a producer. In April 2025, the studio made its first appearance at CinemaCon in Las Vegas, with the plan to release more films theatrically in 2026 than in previous years.

In June 2025, Sony Pictures and Amazon MGM formed a multi-year deal in which Sony would handle the international theatrical distribution of titles from the latter studio following the conclusion of its four-year deal with Warner Bros. Pictures. However, this does not include home entertainment rights as Warner Bros. Home Entertainment (and later on, Alliance Entertainment) will continue to distribute MGM's products. This deal would reunite Sony and MGM since 2020.

In 2026, Amazon MGM Studios has set up direct distribution branch in overseas. The first country is the United Kingdom. The second countries were Australia and New Zealand, and the third country is France. The first movie that was distributed directly under Amazon MGM Studios was Verity in the UK, Australia and New Zealand.

In August 2026, Amazon MGM signed a multi-year first-look film deal with David Heyman's British production company Heyday Films.

On November 18, 2026, Amazon reported that Amazon MGM Studios has boosted film output and doubled investments in film production since the 2022 acquisition, MGM content available on non-Amazon streaming services nearly tripled from 2021 to 2024, Amazon MGM Studios invested more in cast and crew for its 2026 film slate than the separate companies spent on all films from 2017-2020 and that Amazon MGM Studios is on track to release 133 films between 2022 and 2026, a significant increase over the 122 combined releases in the five years before the merger (2017-2021). Amazon MGM Studios invested twice as much to produce those 133 films ($5.22 billion) as went into the combined releases ($2.6 billion) in the five years before the merger. Amazon MGM Studios invested more in cast and crew to produce its 2026 film slate than the production budgets of every movie Amazon and MGM released between 2017 and 2020 combined. According to data from Ampere, the number of MGM hours available on non-Amazon, non-MGM+ streaming services has nearly tripled from 2021 to 2024. The number of MGM library titles licensed for distribution across other viewing services also increased following the acquisition compared to the three-year period before for films (4,903 to 5,391) and TV episodes (11,468 to 13,151). Amazon states the merger enabled the company to build out Amazon MGM Studios Distribution to manage worldwide distribution for film and television across the company. Amazon MGM Studios has also maintained MGM Television’s independent production relationships.

=== Accolades ===
In 2015, Transparent was the first show produced by Amazon Studios to win a major award and the first show produced by a streaming media service to win the Golden Globe Award for Best Television Series – Musical or Comedy (a.k.a. "Golden Globe for Best Series").

In 2017, for Manchester by the Sea, Amazon Studios became the first streaming media service to be nominated for the Academy Award for Best Picture; the film was nominated for a total of six Academy Awards, winning two: Best Actor for Casey Affleck and Best Original Screenplay for Kenneth Lonergan.

The film The Salesman (2016) won the Academy Award for Best Foreign Language Film; it was directed by Asghar Farhadi and distributed in the US by Amazon Studios.

In 2018, the period comedy-drama television series The Marvelous Mrs. Maisel, starring Rachel Brosnahan, won two Golden Globe Awards (Best Television Series – Musical or Comedy and Best Actress – Musical or Comedy for Brosnahan) and five Primetime Emmy Awards, including Outstanding Comedy Series and Outstanding Lead Actress in a Comedy Series for Brosnahan.

United Artists Releasing's Women Talking earned a nomination for Best Picture at the 95th Academy Awards and won the award for Best Adapted Screenplay.

In 2023, Orion Pictures' American Fiction earned Amazon MGM Studios its first win for the People's Choice Award at the Toronto International Film Festival following the studio's rebrand. The film went on to receive five nominations at the 96th Academy Awards; including Best Picture, and won the award for Best Adapted Screenplay.

== Assets ==
=== Film production and distribution ===
Logos of Metro-Goldwyn-Mayer, United Artists and Orion Pictures, the studio's primary film units.
- Metro-Goldwyn-Mayer
- United Artists
- Orion Pictures
  - Orion Classics
- American International Pictures
- Prime Movies
- Amazon Content Services
- Amazon MGM Studios Distribution

=== Television ===
- Metro-Goldwyn-Mayer Television
  - MGM Alternative Television
  - MGM International Television
  - MGM On Demand
  - MGM/UA Television
- Big Fish Entertainment LLC
  - Half Moon Pictures
- Evolution Media
- Gato Grande Productions (joint venture with Mexican entrepreneurs Miguel Aleman and Antonio Cué)
- Lightworkers Media

==== Channels ====
- MGM+
  - MGM+ Marquee
  - MGM+ Hits
  - MGM+ Drive-In
  - MGM+ On Demand
- ScreenPix
  - ScreenPix Action
  - ScreenPix Westerns
  - ScreenPix Voices
  - ScreenPix On Demand
- MGM Sci-Fi (Roku linear channel)

=== Others ===
- Amazon MGM Studios Consumer Products
- MGM Home Entertainment
- MGM Music
- Prime Video Sport
- MGM On Stage

== Production libraries ==
=== Highest-grossing films ===
Highest-grossing in North America
Rank	Title	Year	Gross
1	Project Hail Mary	2026	$344,050,007
2	Creed III	2023	$156,298,825
3	Red One	2024	$97,000,759
4	The Beekeeper	2024	$66,220,535
5	The Sheep Detectives	2026	$66,120,440
6	Verity	2026	$65,927,001
7	The Accountant 2	2025	$65,486,713
8	Masters of the Universe	2026	$64,830,245
9	The Boys in the Boat	2023	$52,641,306
10	Air	2023	$52,460,106
11	Challengers	2024	$50,119,408
12	Manchester by the Sea	2016	$47,695,120
13	The Big Sick	2017	$42,872,844
14	A Working Man	2025	$37,000,711
15	Mercy	2026	$24,410,809

Highest-grossing worldwide
Rank	Title	Year	Gross
1	Project Hail Mary	2026	$684,117,347
2	Creed III	2023	$275,248,615
3	Red One	2024	$185,900,759
4	The Beekeeper	2024	$162,619,531
5	Verity	2026	$145,127,001
6	The Sheep Detectives	2026	$133,101,193
7	Masters of the Universe	2026	$113,763,426
8	The Accountant 2	2025	$102,086,713
9	A Working Man	2025	$99,054,702
10	Challengers	2024	$96,119,408
11	Air	2023	$90,060,106
12	Manchester by the Sea	2016	$78,986,220
13	Crime 101	2026	$70,431,768
14	The Big Sick	2017	$56,412,844
15	Mercy	2026	$48,410,809
