= Felix F. Feist =

American lyricist and film studio executive (1883–1936)

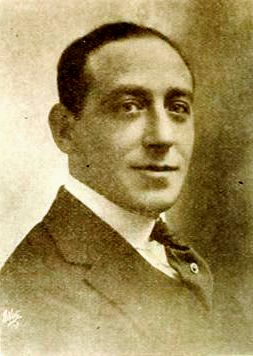
Felix F. Feist in 1919

Felix F. Feist (July 15, 1883 - April 15, 1936) was a lyricist and Metro-Goldwyn-Mayer executive. He wrote the lyrics for songs in several Broadway shows. Leo Feist, one of the "Big 7" sheet music publishers, was his brother. Felix E. Feist was his son, and Raymond E. Feist is his grandson. Several of the songs he wrote the lyrics for became prominent. "Strolling 'Long the Pike" was a song set at the 1904 World's Fair in St. Louis. Ada Jones recorded the song "Bull Frog & Coon" in 1906 for Edison Records. It was also recorded by the Five Brown Brothers in 1911. Feist wrote the lyrics for the song now known as "Skidamarink", a popular children's song.

He had one son, Felix E. Feist ("Felix Jr."), and one daughter.

== Works ==
- "Skiddy-Mer-Rink-A-Doo" and the lyrics to other songs for the Broadway show The Echo
- "Get Your Partner for the Barn Dance" (1908) from the musical Fluffy Ruffles
- "Stolling 'Long the Pike", 1904 World's Fair
- Señora Waltzes
- "My little Zu-oo-oo-lu", Love in a Jungle
- "Johnnie was a Drummer Boy"
- "L-o-v-e spells Trouble to me" composed by Joel P. Corin performed by Arthur Collins
- Bull Frog & Coon performed by Five Brown Brothers
- "I'm Going on the War Path" (1908), lyrics
