= Felix Feist (director) =

American film director (1910–1965)

Felix E. Feist
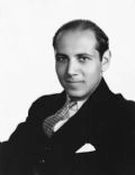
- Feist c. 1940
- Born: Felix Ellison Feist; February 28, 1910; New York City, United States
- Died: September 2, 1965 (aged 55); Encino, California, United States
- Education: Columbia University, New York
- Occupations: Director, writer
- Years active: 1930–1965
- Spouses: Dorothy Hart Jacobs (m. 1933, divorced); Lisa Howard (divorced); Lulu Allen (m. 1955)
- Children: 6, including Raymond E. Feist
- Father: Felix F. Feist
- Relatives: Leo Feist (uncle)

Felix Ellison Feist (/faɪst/; February 28, 1910 – September 2, 1965) was an American film and television director and writer born in New York City. He is probably best remembered for Deluge (1933), for writing and directing the film noirs The Devil Thumbs a Ride (1947) and The Threat (1949), and for helming the second screen version of the Curt Siodmak sci-fi tale Donovan's Brain (1953), which starred Nancy Davis before she became known as Nancy Reagan.

He directed Judy Garland and Deanna Durbin in their first significant screen appearances, in the 1936 short film Every Sunday.

== Life ==
Feist was the son of a MGM sales executive, Felix F. Feist (1884–1936), and nephew of a publishing house magnate, Leo Feist. He was educated at Columbia University. In the late 1920s he found work as a newsreel cameraman, and he was on staff at MGM from 1929 to 1932, directing screen tests and producing one-reel travelogues.

In 1931, Feist married Dorothy Hart Jacobs. The two met in New York, NY, and traveled to Los Angeles together where Feist began his career with MGM. They had two daughters, Marjory and Jacqueline Ellison.

Marjory (or Marjery) and Jacqueline Ellison. Jacqueline eloped at age 14 in Tijuana, but the marriage was annulled five year later on the grounds that it was improperly performed.

His second marriage was to Lisa Howard, a pioneering female journalist and television news anchor, who briefly had an acting career. She appeared in a few of his films, such as The Man Who Cheated Himself, Guilty of Treason, and Donovan's Brain. They had a daughter, Fritzi.

In 1955, he married Lulu Estelle "Barbara" Allen, whose son, Raymond, he adopted. Raymond became a fantasy author.

Feist died of cancer on September 2, 1965, at the age of 55. In his obituary, it was reported that he had three sons and three daughters. The sons were Felix, Jr., Raymond, and Robert.

== Filmography ==
Year	Film	Functioned as				
Year	Film	Director	Producer	Screenwriter	Music	Actor
1930	The Sea Bat				Yes^{[I]}	
1932	Football Footwork	Yes				
1933	Deluge	Yes				
1934	My Grandfather's Clock	Yes		Yes^{[II]}	Yes^{[III]}	
1934	Strikes and Spares	Yes				
1934	MGM's March on in 1934-35 with Metro Goldwyn Mayer: Convention of the Century					Yes
1935	Football Teamwork	Yes				
1936	Every Sunday	Yes				
1936	Hollywood Extra!	Yes				
1936	Hollywood - The Second Step	Yes				
1936	How to Train a Dog			Yes^{[IV]}		
1936	How to Vote	Yes				
1936	How to Be a Detective	Yes				
1937	The Romance of Digestion	Yes		Yes^{[V]}		
1937	Give Till It Hurts	Yes				
1937	Decathlon Champion: The Story of Glenn Morris	Yes				
1937	What Do You Think?	Yes				
1938	The Magician's Daughter	Yes		Yes^{[VI]}		
1938	Follow the Arrow	Yes				
1939	Double Diving	Yes				
1939	Happily Buried	Yes		Yes^{[IV]}		
1939	Prophet Without Honor	Yes				
1939	Radio Hams	Yes				
1939	Take a Cue	Yes				
1939	Set 'em Up	Yes				
1939	Let's Talk Turkey	Yes				
1940	Pound Foolish	Yes				
1940	Golden Gloves	Yes				
1940	Dreams	Yes				
1943	All by Myself	Yes				
1943	You're a Lucky Fellow, Mr. Smith	Yes				
1944	Pardon My Rhythm	Yes				
1944	This Is the Life	Yes				
1944	Reckless Age	Yes	Yes			
1945	George White's Scandals	Yes				
1947	The Devil Thumbs a Ride	Yes		Yes^{[IV]}		
1948	The Winner's Circle	Yes				
1949	The Threat	Yes				
1950	Guilty of Treason	Yes				
1950	The Golden Gloves Story	Yes		Yes^{[II]}		
1950	The Man Who Cheated Himself	Yes				
1951	Fixin' Fool			Yes^{[IV]}		
1951	Tomorrow Is Another Day	Yes				
1951	The Basketball Fix	Yes				
1952	The Big Trees	Yes				
1952	This Woman Is Dangerous	Yes				
1952	Babes in Bagdad			Yes^{[VII]}		
1952	Battles of Chief Pontiac	Yes				
1953	The Man Behind the Gun	Yes				
1953	Donovan's Brain	Yes		Yes^{[II]}		
1955	Pirates of Tripoli	Yes				

I Credited for the lyrics of "Lo-Lo"
II Credited for the screenplay
III Credited as a composer
IV Credited as a writer
V Uncredited
VI Credited for the story
VII Credited for the original screenplay

== Television ==
Year	Title		Credited as	
Year	Series	Episode	Director	Producer
1953	The Revlon Mirror Theater	"Lullaby"	Yes	
1953	General Electric Theater	"The Eye of the Beholder"	Yes	
1956	Star Stage	"The Mountain That Moved"	Yes	
1956	Telephone Time	"The Man in the Black Robe"	Yes	
1956	The Jane Wyman Show	"Father Forgets”	Yes	
1956–1957	Zane Grey Theater	5 episodes	Yes	
1957	Highway Patrol	"Gem Robbery"	Yes	
1957	Dr. Christian	"Amnesia"	Yes	
1957	Tombstone Territory	unknown episodes	Yes	
1958	Sea Hunt	"Sixty Feet Below"	Yes	
1958	Harbourmaster	"Strangers in Town"	Yes	
1958	The Texan	unknown episodes	Yes	
1958–1959	The Californians	5 episodes directed, 3 episodes produced	Yes	Yes
1959	The Deputy	"Back to Glory"	Yes	
1959	Riverboat	2 episodes	Yes	
1960	Bonanza	"Blood on the Land"	Yes	
1960–1961	Adventures in Paradise	17 episodes	Yes	
1961–1962	Follow the Sun	2 episodes	Yes	
1962	Bus Stop	"Verdict of 12"	Yes	
1964	Peyton Place	unknown episodes		Yes
1964–1965	Voyage to the Bottom of the Sea	6 episodes	Yes	
1965	The Outer Limits	"The Probe"	Yes	

== Bibliography ==
- "Felix E. Feist > Filmography". Allmovie.
