= Mike Hopkins (executive) =

American executive

Mike Hopkins is an American executive. He is the head of Prime Video and Amazon MGM Studios. He was previously the chairman of Sony Pictures Television and was the CEO of Hulu from 2013 to 2017.
