= Bourne Co. Music Publishers =

American music publishing company

- Cover of the sheet music, "The Terry Theme" by Charlie Chaplin, as used in his film Limelight, and published by Bourne, Inc.
- Founded: 1919; 107 years ago (As "Irving Berlin, Inc.")
- Founder: Saul Bourne; Max Winslow; Irving Berlin
- Country of origin: United States
- Distribution: Regional
- Publication types: Sheet music
- Official website: bournemusic.com

Bourne Co. Music Publishers is an American publisher of sheet music, and one of the largest privately held international music publishers in the world, with over three thousand titles in their catalogue. Subsidiaries include Bourne Music Canada Limited, Bourne Music France, and Bourne Music Ltd. (UK).

== History ==
In 1919, Saul Bourne (born Saul H. Bornstein, also Sol Bourne, c. 1884, died October 13, 1957, age 73), Max Winslow (c.1883–1942) and Irving Berlin (1888–1989) founded the publishing company Irving Berlin Inc., the predecessor company to Bourne Co. Prior to this, Bourne had been the professional manager of Berlin's own publishing company, Irving Berlin Music. In the early 1940s, Berlin privately accused Bornstein of putting fake contracts through the company. According to Irving Berlin biographer Laurence Bergreen,

"The two antagonists met shortly after the confrontation, and Berlin offered Bornstein a way to leave the company and save face. It was, under the circumstances, a generous deal. Berlin would retain the copyrights to — and thus the right to publish — his own songs, and Bornstein could take the copyrights to all other songs published by Berlin's company. Those non-Berlin songs amounted to a large share of the business — not half, but enough for Bornstein to become the proprietor of a lucrative music publishing company without having to do anything except agree to Berlin's conditions."

The partnership between Bourne and Berlin ended in 1944 (Winslow having died in 1942). The former "Irving Berlin, Inc." was renamed to "Bourne, Inc.," while Berlin's later publications were issued by the "Irving Berlin Music Company."

Saul's wife Bonnie took over the running of the company when he died in 1957, and their daughter took over when she died in 1993. The daughter of Saul and Bonnie, Beebe Bourne was the modern day publisher until her death, 1 Nov 2005. Bonnie and Beebe Bourne were the only two women in history to receive the Abe Olman Publisher Award from the Songwriters Hall of Fame.

The company's copyrights consist of classics, Charlie Chaplin songs, and the soundtracks to early Disney motion pictures such as Snow White, Pinocchio, and Dumbo. Its office is in New York City.

== Legal issues ==
=== Woods v. Bourne 60 F. 3d 978 (2d Cir. 1995) ===
In 1995, Bourne Co was taken to court by Harry Woods over his song, "When the Red, Red, Robin Comes Bob, Bob, Bobbin' Along". The University of California Los Angeles School of Law noted that "This case involves an obscure area of copyright law" regarding derivative works derived from the original song and Woods' right to terminate the license under Section 304 of the Copyright Act. The appeal court sided with the defendant.

=== Bourne v. Walt Disney Co., 68 F.3d 621 (2d Cir. 1995) ===
In 1995, Bourne Co took The Walt Disney Company to court over alleged copyright infringement over (a) "Disney's sale of videocassette recordings featuring Bourne's copyrighted compositions from the motion pictures Snow White and the Seven Dwarfs and Pinocchio, and (b) "related to Disney's use of the Compositions in television commercials". The jury rejected Bourne's claim of video copyright infringement, but found in favour of Bourne's claim over the use of the material in TV commercials.

=== Phil Spector case ===
In 1997, the British newspaper, The Independent, noted that:

"Phil Spector won back the United Kingdom copyright to his first hit, "To Know Him is to Love Him" [and] that Bourne Music had no rights to the copyright after December 1986."

== Notable music rights ==
=== Charlie Chaplin songs ===
- "Eternally" from Limelight
- "Smile" from Modern Times
- "Terry's Theme" from Limelight

=== Disney ===
- "Heigh-Ho" (from Snow White and the Seven Dwarfs)
- "When You Wish Upon a Star" (from Pinocchio)
- "Whistle While You Work" (from Snow White and the Seven Dwarfs)
- "Who's Afraid of the Big Bad Wolf?" (from Three Little Pigs)

=== Others ===
- "Ain't Nobody Here but Us Chickens" (Louis Jordan)
- "Are You Lonesome Tonight?" (Elvis Presley)
- "Black Magic Woman" (Fleetwood Mac)
- "Bring Me Sunshine" (Brenda Lee, Jack Greene, Willie Nelson)
- "Me and My Shadow" (Al Jolson. Sammy Davis Jr. and Frank Sinatra)
- "My Mammy" (performed by Al Jolson)
- "On the Good Ship Lollipop" (Shirley Temple)
- "Popcorn" (Hot Butter)
- "Swinging on a Star" (Tony Bennett. Bing Crosby)
- "Witch Doctor" (Alvin and the Chipmunks)
- "My Girl" (Ronnie White & Smokey Robinson)

== See also ==
- Category:Music published by Bourne Co. Music Publishers
