= Sharon, Lois & Bram discography =

The discographies of Sharon, Lois & Bram and Sharon, Bram & Friends include numerous albums and recordings.

== Albums ==
=== 1970s ===
- One Elephant, Deux Éléphants/One Elephant 1985 A&M Records/One Elephant Went Out To Play 1994 DRIVE ent. 1978. Elephant Records. / 2002. Casablanca Kids Inc.
- Smorgasbord. 1979. Elephant Records. / 2006. Casablanca Kids Inc.

=== 1980s ===
- Singing 'n' Swinging. 1980 Elephant Records, 1996 Drive Entertainment.
- In the Schoolyard. 1981 Elephant Records, 2007 Casablanca Kids Inc.
- One, Two, Three, Four, Live!. 1982, 1996 Elephant Records.
- Mainly Mother Goose. 1984 Elephant Records, 1984 Drive Entertainment, 2004 Casablanca Kids Inc.
- Sharon, Lois & Bram's Elephant Show Record - "The Elephant Show Volume 1" 1986 Elephant Records, 1994 Drive Entertainment, 2009 Casablanca Kids Inc.
- Stay Tuned - The Elephant Show Volume 2 1987, 1996 Elephant Records.
- Happy Birthday. 1988 Elephant Records, 1996 Drive Entertainment.
- Car Tunes for Summertime. 1989 Elephant Records.
- Car Tunes about Animals. 1989 Elephant Records.
- Car Tunes from Around The World. 1989 Elephant Records.
- Car Tunes for Sleepytime. 1989 Elephant Records.

=== 1990s ===
- Car Tunes for Elephant Showstoppers. 1990. Elephant Records.
- Car Tunes for Schooldays. 1990. Elephant Records.
- Car Tunes for After School. 1990. Elephant Records.
- Car Tunes for Naming Games. 1990. Elephant Records.
- Sing A to Z. 1990. Elephant Records. / 1994. Drive Entertainment.
- Kidbits. Elephant Records. 1992.
- Great Big Hits. 1992. A&M Records. / 1992. Elephant Records.
- Songs in the Key of Kids. 1993. Drive Entertainment.
- Candles, Snow & Mistletoe 1993. Elephant Records. / Drive Entertainment. / 2000. Casablanca Kids Inc. / "Family Christmas" 2009 Casablanca Kids Inc.
- Candles Long Ago 1993. Elephant Records/ Drive Entertainment.
- All The Fun You Can Sing! 1993. Elephant Records. / 1994. Drive Entertainment.
- Club-E Collection 1994. Drive Entertainment / 1994. Elephant Records / 1995. Gap Inc.
- Sing Around the Campfire. 1994. Elephant Records. / 1995. Drive Entertainment.
- Sharon, Lois & Bram Sampler 1995. Drive Entertainment
- Kid Bits Vol. 1, 2 & 3 1995. Drive Entertainment.
- Let's Dance! 1995. Elephant Records. / 1995. Drive Entertainment.
- Car Tunes Vol. 1 1995. Elephant Records. / 1995. Sears KidVantage.
- Car Tunes Vol. 2 1995. Elephant Records. / 1995. Sears KidVantage.
- Car Tunes Vol. 3 1995. Elephant Records. / 1995. Sears KidVantage.
- Car Tunes Vol. 4 1995. Elephant Records. / 1995. Sears KidVantage.
- Wild About Animals 1997. Elephant Records.
- Friends Forever 1998. Skinnamarink Entertainment.
- Skinnamarink TV. 1998. Skinnamarink Entertainment.
- Silly & Sweet Songs. 1999. Skinnamarink Entertainment.

=== 2000s ===
- Travellin' Tunes. 2001. Mother's Love Records.
- Great Big Hits 2. 2002. Elephant Records. / 2002. Casablanca Kids Inc.
- Mother Goose & More. 2002. Fisher-Price Inc.
- Name Games. 2002. Casablanca Kids Inc.
- School Days. 2004. Casablanca Kids Inc.
- Everybody Sing! 2004. Casablanca Kids Inc.
- Sleepytime. 2004. Casablanca Kids Inc.

=== 2010s ===
- 1, 2, 3, 4 LIVE! 2016. Casablanca Kids, Inc.
- Sharon & Bram and Friends. 2019. Casablanca Kids Inc.

=== 2020s ===
- Best of the Best Live. 2021. Red Brick Songs, Inc.
- A Little Bit Country. 2023. Red Brick Songs, Inc.
- Elephant Show Stoppers!. 2024. Red Brick Songs, Inc.
- Elephant Show Stoppers! (Extended Version). 2024. Red Brick Songs, Inc.
- Road Trip Songs. 2025. Red Brick Songs, Inc.

== Singles ==
=== 2010s ===
- Hey Santa Claus. 2017. Red Brick Songs, Inc.
- The Colour Song (featuring Colin Mochrie). 2018. Red Brick Songs, Inc.
- The Hug Song. 2019. Red Brick Songs, Inc.
- Talk About Peace (featuring Jim Cuddy). 2019. Red Brick Songs, Inc.
- Different. 2019. Red Brick Songs, Inc.
- The Drum Song. 2019. Red Brick Songs, Inc.
- Skinnamarinky Two. 2019. Red Brick Songs, Inc.
- Everybody Talks. 2019. Red Brick Songs, Inc.

=== 2020s ===
- One Elephant Went Out To Play (All Friends Version). 2022. Red Brick Songs, Inc.
- Grandpa's Farm. 2023. Red Brick Songs, Inc.
- Peanut Butter and Jelly. 2023. Red Brick Songs, Inc.
- Tommy Thumb/Thumbelina. 2025. Red Brick Songs, Inc.
- Animal Crackers In My Soup. 2025. Red Brick Songs, Inc.
- It's A Lovely Day Today. 2025. Red Brick Songs, Inc.
- Bells Medley. 2025. Red Brick Songs, Inc.
- Sally Go Round the Sun Medley (A Tribute to Edith Fowke). 2026. Red Brick Songs, Inc.
- Sing A Song. 2026. Red Brick Songs, Inc.
- Side By Side. 2026. Red Brick Songs, Inc.
