= Wild About Animals =

Studio album by Sharon, Lois & Bram
- Released: 1997
- Genre: Children's music
- Length: 55:00
- Label: Elephant Records
- Producer: Stephen McNie

Sharon, Lois & Bram chronology
Let's Dance! (1995)	Wild About Animals (1997)	Friends Forever (1998)

Wild About Animals is the 18th album by popular children's entertainers Sharon, Lois & Bram, originally released in 1997. It featured the trio's very best songs about animals and is available on cassette and CD. This album was only released on the trio's own Elephant Records, after the trio dropped their previous U.S. distributor, Drive Entertainment. Hence, this product was only available in Canada. It was dubbed the trio's "musical tribute to fur, feathers, feelers and fins".

== Nominations and awards ==
Our Choice Award - Canadian Children's Book Center (1997)

== Touring and promotions ==
This album, unlike other Sharon, Lois & Bram albums, was not highly publicized and therefore there was no tour or promotions for the album. The trio, however, did perform a 9-concert series performing songs from the album.

The trio performed three concerts on November 30, 1997 at the National Arts Centre in Ottawa, Ontario. They also performed six shows at the Hummingbird Centre in Toronto, Ontario on December 5–7, 1997. It was estimated that between the nine shows, approximately 25,000 people turned up.

== Track listing ==
1. "One Elephant, Deux Elephants"
2. "Grandpa's Farm"
3. "My Dog Rags"
4. "The Farmer In the Dell"
5. "Going to the Zoo"
6. "Horsey, Horsey"
7. "Noah's Old Ark"
8. "The Ants Go Marching"
9. "Five Little Monkeys"
10. "Five Little Fishies"
11. "Les Petits Poissons"
12. "Shoe A Little Horse"
13. "Caballito Blanco"
14. "Terrence McDiddler/Three Little Fishies/'Ishin'"
15. "Cats & Mice Medley"
16. "The Cat Came Back"
17. "Arabella Miller"
18. "Bluebird, Bluebird"
19. "Two Little Blackbirds/Five Little Chickadees"
20. "Three Craw"
21. "Mairzy Doats"
22. "A Riddle"
23. "Little Rabbit Foo-Foo"
24. "Susannah's A Funny Old Man"
25. "Tingalayo"
26. "The Smile on the Crocodile"
27. "Miss Muffet/The Eensy Weensy Spider"
28. "Chicken Medley"
29. "Don't Bring An Elephant (To A Family Meal)"

All the songs featured on this album have been previously recorded for the trio's past albums, which include "Sing A to Z", "Mainly Mother Goose", "Sharon, Lois & Bram's Elephant Show Record", "Singing 'n' Swinging", "Great Big Hits", "Candles, Snow & Mistletoe" and "Happy Birthday".
