= If I Knew You Were Comin' I'd've Baked a Cake =

Single by Eileen Barton
- B-side: "Poco, Loco in the Coco"
- Released: 1950
- Recorded: January 1950
- Genre: pop
- Length: 2:37
- Label: National
- Songwriters: Al Hoffman; Bob Merrill; Clem Watts
- Producer: Tom Dowd

Eileen Barton singles chronology
"If I Knew You Were Comin' I'd've Baked a Cake" (1950)	"Dixieland Ball" (1950)

"If I Knew You Were Comin' I'd've Baked a Cake" is a popular song written by Al Hoffman, Bob Merrill, and Clem Watts and published in 1950.

In the U.S., the best known version of the song was recorded by Eileen Barton in January 1950. Joe Lipman served as the musical director for the recording sessions for the two sides. The recording was released by National Records as catalog number 9103. When the song became too big a hit for National to handle, it arranged with Mercury Records to help with distribution. The record first reached the Billboard charts on March 3, 1950 and lasted 15 weeks on the chart, peaking at #1. The song was one of Tom Dowd's first hits as a producer.

In 1962, Barton's recording of the song was included in a list of 101 Perennial Singles Hits compiled by Billboard – a group "For year-round programming by juke box operators and radio stations ... a catalog of standards that can provide consistent earnings for operators and a wealth of material for discussion by broadcasters."

== Cover versions ==
In the UK, a version was recorded by Gracie Fields in 1950, and was used on a British television advertising campaign for Rightmove in 2007.

Kitty Bluett and Bill Kerr recorded a version in 1950.

Another version was recorded by Georgia Gibbs. The recording was made on February 16, 1950, and released by Coral Records as catalogue number 60169. The record first reached the Billboard charts on March 17, 1950, and lasted six weeks on the chart, peaking at #21.

Another version was recorded by Betty Harris and a choir, with Art Mooney's Orchestra. The recording was made on February 15, 1950, and released by MGM Records as catalogue number 10660.

Bing Crosby and Bob Hope recorded a version together that expanded on the standard lyrics to include verses about making a meal and preparing a goose. This was first heard on the CBS radio program, ‘Welcome Back Baseball’ broadcast on 15 April 1950.

In Australia, a version was recorded by June Hamilton in May 1950 and released by Pacific Records as catalog number 10-0030.

The Fontane Sisters recorded a version of the song for RCA in 1951.

Barton performed a second recording of the song for MGM in 1959. The new version reached #117 in the Music Vendor survey.

Two versions of the song were recorded for Sesame Street. The first was recorded in 1969 in a skit involving Ernie and Cookie Monster. A second version involving Cookie Monster and Count von Count was recorded in 1976 and released on the B side of "C is for Cookie".

In 1988, children's entertainment trio Sharon, Lois & Bram recorded the song that appeared on both their hit television series, The Elephant Show as well as their 10th Anniversary album, Happy Birthday. The song was later included in a collection of their best hits titled Great Big Hits. The trio also re-recorded the song for their second hit television series Skinnamarink TV in 1997.

Baker Bob sang the song before Piella Bakewell murdered him at the beginning of the Wallace & Gromit cartoon A Matter of Loaf and Death.

A version was used as the opening theme to Exit 57, a sketch comedy series that aired on Comedy Central and starred Amy Sedaris, Paul Dinello, Stephen Colbert, Mitch Rouse, and Jodi Lennon.

Manhattan band The Maxes recorded a version of the song in 2008 as part of a 12-song Al Hoffman collection titled The Maxes Sing Al Hoffman.

The song was performed on M*A*S*H during the season one episode "Henry, Please Come Home" [original air date 11/19/1972]. Two Tokyo-based geisha girls performed the song, along with acoustic guitar accompaniment, for Hawkeye Pierce, Henry Blake and Trapper John McIntyre.

The song appeared in the 1978 film adaptation of Same Time, Next Year. When Doris is preparing to shower, George tells her that the song that played while they were making love was "If I Knew You Were Coming Id've Baked A Cake" and tells her that it will be their song. George later plays a part of the song on the piano in a later scene of the movie.

Certain versions of the song include the lyrics If I Knew You Were Comin' I'd've Baked a Cake "this morning" instead of "how d'you do".

== Charts ==
Chart (1950)	Peak position
US Best-Selling Pop Singles (Billboard)	1
