= Side by Side (1927 song) =

Popular song by Harry M. Woods

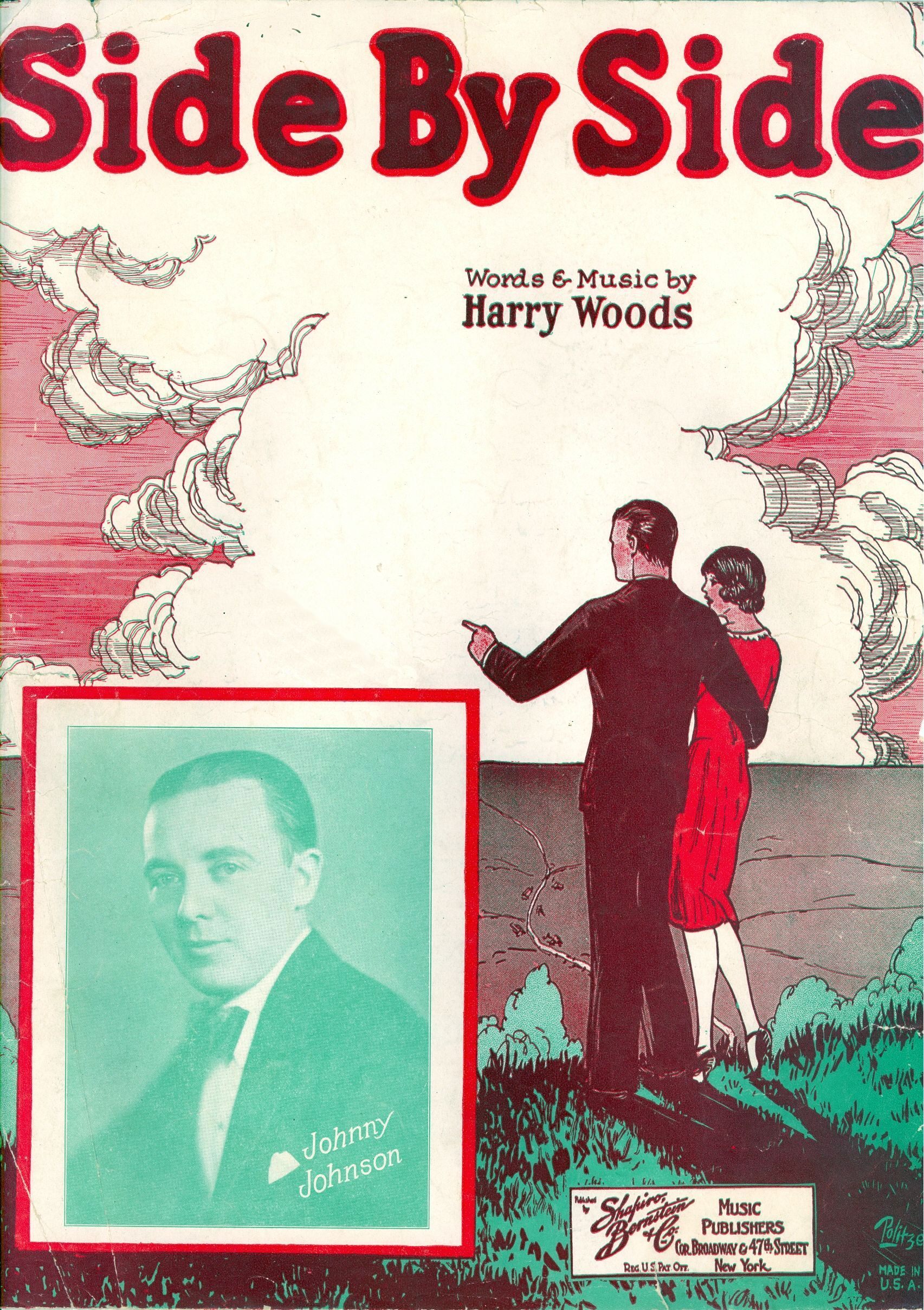

Song
- Published: 1927
- Recorded: 1927
- Songwriter: Harry M. Woods

"Side by Side"
Performed by Nick Lucas in 1927

"Side by Side" is a popular song by Harry M. Woods written in 1927, and is now considered a standard.

== Background ==
Harry M. Woods wrote numerous 1920s standards, including "When the Red, Red Robin (Comes Bob, Bob, Bobbin' Along)", "I'm Looking Over a Four Leaf Clover", and "Try a Little Tenderness". He composed his songs on piano, despite the fact that he was born without fingers on his left hand.

== Kay Starr recording ==
The song is probably best known in a 1953 recording by Kay Starr. The Kay Starr recording was released by Capitol Records as catalog number 1688 with the flip side "The Breeze".

== Recorded versions ==
The song has been recorded by many artists including:

- Cliff "Ukulele Ike" Edwards (1927)
- Elmer Gross's Dance Kings (recorded April 23, 1927, released by Silvertone Records number 5109, with the flip side "One O'Clock Baby", recorded by Eddie Miles)
- The Keller Sisters and Lynch with Charley Straight and His Orchestra as "The Tuxedo Orchestra" (recorded on March 31, 1927; released by Brunswick Records as catalog number 3516-A, with the flip side "Nesting Time")
- The Keller Sisters and Lynch with the Clevelanders, March 28, 1927, Brunswick studios, no masters, rejected
- Nick Lucas (The Crooning Troubadour), recorded March 24, 1927; released by Brunswick Records as catalog number 3512, with the flip side "Why Should I Say I'm Sorry?"
- Lee Morse (1927) (comedian, with piano and guitar, recorded March 16, 1927; released by Columbia Records as catalog number 974-D, with the flip side "My Idea of Heaven")
- Oreste and his Queensland Orchestra with Jack Kaufman, late 1927, Menlo Park, Edison cylinder
- The Rhythm Boys including Bing Crosby, Paul Whiteman and His Orchestra (recorded April 29, 1927, issued by Victor Records as catalog number 20627, with the flip side "Pretty Lips")
- Aileen Stanley and Johnny Marvin (duet, with ukulele and orchestra, recorded May 25, 1927; released by Victor Records as catalog number 20714, with the flip side "Red Lips, Kiss My Blues Away," and by His Master's Voice as catalog number B2519)
- Horace Winters Orchestra (vocal: I. Kaufman), issued by Silvertone Records in 1927 as catalog number 5151, with the flip side "Just Another Day Wasted Away"
- Merle Twins, Syncopating Songsters, New York, 1928, Vitaphone 612
- The Gene Krupa Orchestra w. vocals by Anita O'Day (recorded January 23, 1942; released by Columbia Records as catalog number 36726, with the flip side "Bolero at the Savoy")
- John Serry Sr. and his ensemble (1956) for Dot Records (See Squeeze Play).

External audio
- You may hear an arrangement of "Side by Side" by John Serry performed in 1956 Here on Archive.org

- Polly Bergen on The Polly Bergen Show, NBC (November 16, 1957)
- Caterina Valente for the album A Toast to the Girls (1958)
- The Duke Ellington Orchestra w. vocals by Johnny Hodges (1958)
- Frankie Laine and Frank Comstock and his orchestra - included in the album You Are My Love (1958)
- Pat Boone and Shirley Boone - for the album Side by Side (1959)
- Brenda Lee for the album Grandma, What Great Songs You Sang! (1959)
- Guy Mitchell 1959
- Paul Anka for the 1958 album Paul Anka (ABC Paramount 10078, 1960)
- Steve Lawrence and Eydie Gormé for the album Steve & Eydie – We Got Us (1960)
- Bobby Rydell and Chubby Checker released a version on their 1960 album, Bobby Rydell/Chubby Checker.
- Patsy Cline on the Country Style, USA Radio Show, 1960.
- Kai Winding 1961
- Ray Charles and Betty Carter on the album Ray Charles and Betty Carter (1961)
- Sandler & Young for the album Side by Side (1962) (Capitol Records)
- Hayley Mills (1961-OST "Let's Get Together") - 45 record: Walt Disney Records/Buena Vista, 1962 (US #8, Hawaii #1)
- Bill Haley & His Comets (1962)
- The Brooks Brothers (1963) Pye Records 7N.15527
- Trini Lopez (1965) (LP WB/Reprise R-6183)
- Jane Morgan for her 1965 album In My Style (10/1965) (Epic 5-9847)
- Dean Martin - included in the album Dean Martin Sings Songs from "The Silencers" (1966)
- Major Holley and Slam Stewart - Shut Yo' Mouth! (1981)
- The Osmond Brothers, 1982, for Side by Side: The True Story of the Osmond Family
- Sharon, Lois & Bram on their 1982 album One, Two, Three, Four, Live! and on their children's TV show The Elephant Show: Seasons 1's "Picnic Episode" (a clip of the trio singing the song live in concert) and Season 5's "The Early Years Episode".
- Maria Muldaur (and Friends), 1990 (from On The Sunny Side)
- Bruce Willis and Danny Aiello for the Hudson Hawk (1991) movie soundtrack
- Raffaella Carrà feat. Bud Spencer 1991
- Raffaella Carrà feat. Kabir Bedi 1991
- Ronald McDonald and the Magical Radio kids on Travel Tunes and Play Pack (1995)
- The Kidsongs Kids and the Biggles in "Baby Animal Songs!" (1995)
- Dan Zanes and Friends on their album Night Time! (2002)
- The Kay Starr version of the song was covered by The Puppini Sisters for the Kit Kittredge: An American Girl soundtrack, 2008.

== In popular culture ==
- Episode #152 of the television programme The Adventures of Ozzie & Harriet, which aired December 26, 1952, features the cast, including Rick Nelson, as well as extras singing the song around a campfire.
- "Side by Side" was the theme to a BBC Radio programme of the same name which aired in 1963, hosted by Karl Denver. Notably the show's theme song featured the Karl Denver Trio with John Lennon, Paul McCartney and George Harrison of The Beatles joining in on vocals.
- The song has been mentioned and referred to for a title from the tune's lines of the popular young adult novel, Just as Long as We're Together by Judy Blume.
- "Side by Side" is featured in the movie Richie Rich (film) as the password to the Rich's vault (sung by Mr. and Mrs. Rich).
- "Side by Side" is featured in the film Martin and Lewis, as Dean Martin and Jerry Lewis (played by Jeremy Northam and Sean Hayes) perform the song together during the end of their final performance at the Copacabana nightclub. According to Jerry Lewis's book "Dean and Me (A Love Story)" chapter 16, the actual song on this occasion was their movie theme, "Pardners" but they had actually performed "Side by Side" on the Colgate Comedy Hour.
- Rocky and Bullwinkle sing "Side by Side" in the movie The Adventures of Rocky and Bullwinkle.
- "Side by Side" is the opening song of the movie Kit Kittredge: An American Girl.
- Lauren Ambrose sings the song in the film Sleepwalk With Me (2012).
- The characters Florence and Harry Bentley sing "Side by Side" in the episode of The Jeffersons "Homecoming".
- In the 1992 Seinfeld episode "The Watch", "Side by Side" is sung by Crazy Joe Davola as he walks down the street and Elaine sings along, which begins their relationship.
