= Candles Long Ago =

Studio album by Sharon, Lois & Bram
- Released: 1993
- Genre: Children's music
- Length: 24:00
- Labels: Elephant Records; Drive Entertainment

Sharon, Lois & Bram chronology
Candles, Snow & Mistletoe (1993)	Candles Long Ago (1993)	All The Fun You Can Sing! (1993)

Candles Long Ago is the 14th album by popular children's entertainers Sharon, Lois & Bram, originally released in 1993. It is the first, and only, Chanukah album produced by the trio. Unlike other Sharon, Lois & Bram albums, Candles Long Ago is a miniature album featuring only eleven songs, of which many appear on their previous album Candles, Snow & Mistletoe and one from their second album, Smorgasbord. O It was sold as part of the Sharon, Lois & Bram mini collection at a cheaper price than the trio's regular full-length albums.

== Releases ==
The Canadian edition released in 1994 under Elephant Records only featured seven of the trio's songs, which all appeared (with the exception of one) on the trio's earlier Christmas & Holiday recording, Candles, Snow & Mistletoe. Later that year, Candles Long Ago was picked up by the American Drive Entertainment and released in the United States. The American version, however, featured a total of eleven songs, adding a specially recorded song, Oy Vey to the album as well as three previously recorded songs: Tzena, Tzena from the trio's Sing A to Z recording. Chirri Bim from their 1979, Smorgasbord and Old King Cole/Der Rebbe Elimelech from their Mainly Mother Goose album.

1994 Elephant Records / Drive Entertainment Inc.

== Nominations & Awards ==
Parent's Choice Award (1995)
Our Choice Award – Canadian Children's Book Center (1994)

== Track listing ==
U.S. Version:

1. "Candles Long Ago"
2. "I'm A Little Latke"
3. "Dredyl, Dreydl"
4. "Oy Chanukah"
5. "Chirri Bim"
6. "A Winter Sweet"
7. "Tzena, Tzena"
8. "Don't Bring An Elephant (To A Family Meal)"
9. "Old King Cole / Der Rebbe Elimelech"
10. "Oy Vey"
11. "Candles Long Ago (Reprise)"
