= Stay Tuned (Sharon, Lois & Bram album) =

Studio album by Sharon, Lois & Bram
- Released: 1987
- Genre: Children's music
- Length: 41:36
- Labels: Elephant Records; A&M Records

Sharon, Lois & Bram chronology
Sharon, Lois & Bram's Elephant Show Record (1986)	Stay Tuned (1987)	Happy Birthday (1988)

Alternative cover
- Elephant Records Edition (1987)

Alternative cover
- Elephant Records 2nd Edition (1993)

Stay Tuned is the eighth album by popular children's entertainers Sharon, Lois & Bram, originally released in 1987. The album features songs from Seasons 3 and 4 of what would become their hit TV series "Sharon, Lois & Bram's Elephant Show".

This particular album is still to this day only available on cassette and record. Both Elephant Records & A&M Records have released this album. Stay Tuned is the second of two Sharon, Lois & Bram albums yet to be released onto CD.

== Releases ==
In 1993, Elephant Records re-designed the cover and re-released it under the title "The Elephant Show Volume 2". It is available only on cassette and is extremely hard to find. It was only available through special offers that were found inside other Sharon, Lois & Bram cassettes.

1987/1993 (Elephant Records)
1987 (A&M Records

== Track listing ==
1. "We're Gonna Shine"
2. "Acorn Brown"
3. "Do Your Ears Hang Low?"
4. "Little Liza Jane"
5. "That's What the Daisy Said"
6. "A-Tisket, A-Tasket"
7. "How Much Is That Doggie In the Window?"
8. "Miss Lucy"
9. "The Galaxy Song"
10. "The Ghost of John"
11. "Lots of Worms"
12. "The Hokey Pokey"
13. "Come Follow"
14. "Ukulele Lady"
15. "Rock Around the Clock"
16. "Shoo-Fly Pie"
17. "Tommy Thumb"
18. "Hot Time In the Old Town Tonight"
19. "Fishing Blues"
20. "All Around the Kitchen"
21. "Breakfast Bowl"
22. "Girl from France"
23. "Walkin'"
