= Let's Dance! (Sharon, Lois & Bram album) =

Studio album by Sharon, Lois & Bram
- Released: October 10th, 1995
- Genre: Children's music
- Length: 41:27
- Labels: Elephant Records; Drive Entertainment
- Producer: Jamie Lawrence

Sharon, Lois & Bram chronology
Kid Bits Vol. 1, 2 & 3 (1995)	Let's Dance! (1995)	Wild About Animals (1997)

30th Anniversary Cover

Let's Dance! is the 17th album by popular family entertainers Sharon, Lois & Bram, originally released in the fall of 1995. This was the first Sharon, Lois & Bram album to feature a different repertoire of carefully selected pop tunes spanning over four decades of music from the 40s to the 70s. Unlike other Sharon, Lois & Bram albums, Let's Dance! features a smaller collection of songs, although each song is lengthier than those songs found on other albums of the trio.

"Let's Dance! is all about tunes and grooves, moves and memories. It's music for tots and kiddos and parents and grandparents. It's songs you hum, steps you dance, connections you make, fun you have. It comes from our hearts to yours... to pass on to the children and to remind us once again that a really great song has the power to catch you and keep you. Then - now - and forevermore."

The album "contains simple, upbeat renditions of pop favorites from the likes of The Beatles and Stevie Wonder". The album also features songs by other artists such as Melanie Safka, Nat King Cole, Crosby, Stills, Nash & Young, and Barry Mann. The album was not meant to recreate the originals, but to "give them a kind of '90s, contemporary touch"

The album was reviewed shortly after it was released and it was deemed "Sharon, Lois & Bram pull yet another one out of their trunk! Sharon, Lois & Bram's new release, Let's Dance! is a moving experience. Try to keep from dancing, Mom & Dad! Four decades of popular music are covered by this energetic, talented Canadian vocal trio...tight arrangements, great colors and up-front vocals. The producer is Emmy Award-winner Jamie Lawrence, whose producing bio includes Anita Baker, Michael Bolton, Ray Charles, Aretha Franklin, and Frank Sinatra. [The Album] is true to the original tunes, but uses the musical tools of the 90s...The album is great listening with nice dance grooves. So go buy it and Let's Dance!"

== Releases ==
Let's Dance! is available on CD and cassette released either under the American Drive Entertainment Inc., or in Canada under the trio's very own Elephant Records. In April 2025, to celebrate the 30th Anniversary of the original release, the album was made available on streaming for the first time with updated cover art.

== Touring and promotions ==
To promote their album, Sharon, Lois & Bram embarked on a tour under the album's name to over "40 Canadian cities from coast to coast" as well as to many U.S. cities. Their Let's Dance! Tour was deemed their "most ambitious tour ever" quickly followed by their 1990 tour of Sing A to Z and their 1992 Great Big Tour promoting their Great Big Hits album. The tour lasted from the summer of 1995 to the spring of 1996. Their US section of the tour lasted for the first part of their tour, and then they returned to Canada to complete the remaining cities.

Directed by Brian Hill (author), the concerts featured songs from the album as well as many of the Sharon, Lois & Bram classic songs. Their sidekick, Elephant, toured with them and provided much entertainment throughout the concert. Promotional cassettes were produced with the re-release of their 1989/1990 Car Tunes Series (Volumes 1 through 4), partnered with Sears KidVantage program. They were available for $2.99 each.

Being ambassadors to Unicef, Sharon, Lois & Bram arranged so that with every purchase of a copy of the Let's Dance! album, part of the proceeds would be donated to Unicef to help "treat kids to immunization and health care services, adequate nutrition, basic education and safe water."

== Track listing ==
1. "At the Hop" (Arthur Singer/John Medora/David White)
2. "Simon Says" (Elliot Chiprut)
3. "Sh-Boom" (Fester/Keyse/McCrae/Edwards)
4. "When I'm Sixty-Four" (John Lennon/Paul McCartney)
5. "Our House (CSNY song)" (Graham Nash)
6. "Lollipop (1958 song)" (E. Butler/J. Dixon)
7. "Dream a Little Dream of Me" (Gus Kahn/Fabian Andre/Wilbur Schwandt)
8. "Elephant Party Jam" (James Elliot Lawrence)
9. "Ngiculela – Es Una Historia – I Am Singing" (Stevie Wonder)
10. "Brand New Key" (Melanie Safka)
11. "Good Morning Starshine" (Rado/Ragni/MacDermot)
12. "Straighten Up and Fly Right" (Nat King Cole)
13. "Who Put the Bomp (in the Bomp, Bomp, Bomp)" (Gerry Goffin/Barry Mann)
