= When the Ice Worms Nest Again =

- Folk ballad
- Genre: Folk
- Published: 1939

"When the Ice Worms Nest Again" is a humorous Canadian folk ballad.

== History ==
The song originated in northern British Columbia and the Yukon, possibly during the Klondike Gold Rush of 1898. It was first published in the Yellowknife Prospector in 1939, which claimed that the song was written in 1919 by four men working in the Yukon. Scottish-Canadian poet Robert W. Service also published a ballad with this name in Twenty Bath-Tub Ballads, 1939, claiming that he had written the song in 1911; however, Service's ballad is significantly different from the traditional lyrics. There are many other versions that exist.

It has become the theme song for silver miners in Cobalt, Ontario and fur trappers in The Pas, Manitoba.

== Theme ==
The song describes a romance between the narrator and a "husky dusky maiden" in the Canadian Arctic.

The "ice worms" referenced are not actual ice worms (genus Mesenchytraeus), which the original authors probably would not have known existed. Instead, it refers to "ice worm cocktails", the practice of drawing eyes on pieces of spaghetti and putting it into a cocktail to frighten travellers. This practice was described by, and may have even originated with, Robert Service's poem "The Ballad of the Ice-worm Cocktail".

== Recordings ==
- Wilf Carter, "When the Ice Worms Nest Again" (c. 1950)
- Alan Mills, "When the Ice Worms Nest Again" (1960)
- Loewen Orchestra, "When the Iceworms Nest Again" (1969)
- Folk Songs of Canada, CS3 (Waterloo)
- The Holy Modal Rounders, "When the Iceworms Nest Again", from the album Going Nowhere Fast (1981)
- Sharon, Lois & Bram, "When the Iceworms Nest Again", from the album Sing A to Z, 1990.
- Stompin' Tom Connors "When the Ice-Worm Nests Again," from the album An Ode for the Road, 2002.
