= One Elephant, Deux Éléphants =

Studio album by Sharon, Lois & Bram
- Released: July 1978
- Recorded: May/June 1978
- Genre: Children's music
- Length: 40:30
- Labels: Elephant Records; A&M Records; Drive Entertainment; Casablanca Kids Inc.
- Producer: Bill Usher

Sharon, Lois & Bram chronology
One Elephant, Deux Éléphants (1978)	Smorgasbord (1979)

One Elephant, Deux Éléphants is the first album by popular children's entertainers Sharon, Lois & Bram, originally released in 1978. Throughout their career, the album has been re-released many times under various titles. The song "One Elephant, Deux Éléphants" became the opening theme to their popular children's television show, The Elephant Show, which ran for five seasons. This was also the first time that Sharon, Lois, and Bram covered "Skinnamarink", which became the group's signature song and was performed at the end of every episode of The Elephant Show and Skinnamarink TV.

== Background and production ==
The group had a combined 40 years of performing for children, before their first recording.

The album was recorded at the studio Kensington Sound in Kensington Market, Toronto, Ontario.

The first issue of the record, out in the autumn of 1978, included an activity book with lyrics, as well as suggested games, actions, and activities. The group loaned $1000 from 20 friends, allowing them to press the initial 5000 copies of the album.

=== Genres ===
The album was noted for its variety. Canadian Press newswire service noted that it included "everything from an Iroquois lullaby to a Bach gavotte." Sharon Hampson told the agency that "adults mean well, but they often underestimate what children can understand and enjoy so they feed them feeble music."

Songs on the album include children's voices, as well, recorded live on playgrounds.

== Promotion ==
The album was promoted as "a children's record for the whole family."

Young People's Theatre in Toronto hosted A Children's Elephant Concert with Sharon, Lois and Bram over two days and four performances, "in celebration of the release of their first album."

CTV Television Network commissioned a special titled One Elephant, Deux Éléphants, which aired on 7 July 1979. The one-hour program was commissioned by at least April, and filmed before June. The Red Deer Advocate called it a "vibrant, refreshing musical special... What Sharon, Lois and Bram have done is simply recognize the world most children live in and offer the music, chants and clapping games that come directly from their world. One Elephant, Deux Éléphants quite accurately reflects the way children hear words blended with music and offers these songs with witty invention and high spirits." A CBC special taped in July of that year was released in October as Sharon, Lois and Bram Downtown.

The lyrics of the song "One Elephant, Deux Éléphants" were used for later productions. A 1995 VHS tape featuring songs from Sharon, Lois & Bram's Elephant Show was released as One Elephant Went Out to Play.

== Critical reception ==
Edmonton Journal columnist Lesley Francis commented that "The first time I put it on the turntable I couldn't stop singing or swaying to the music. I probably enjoyed it more than my two-year-old son... My hat is off to this talented trio and their producer, Bill Usher, for bringing out a record which not only appeals to children but to the whole family."

In Regina, The Leader-Post reviewer Sherry Crone suggested the album and booklet "will be a delight to any child. The mixture of adult and children's voices creates a moment of enormous fun for everyone."

A feature about the group in Montreal's The Gazette suggested that the album "sounds good enough to have come from a major recording studio in Los Angeles... The content is distinctive and eclectic... The result was a children's album you didn't have to send children up to their rooms to listen to."

In an article about the larger children's music industry in The Globe and Mail mentioned the album. "It sparkles with wit, with play, with the wisdom of humor."

== Awards ==
The album was nominated for a 1979 Juno Award, in the category "Special Award for Children's Album"; Anne Murray's There's a Hippo in My Tub won. Other nominees were Sandy Offenheim and Family's Are We There Yet?, soundtrack Songs From the Polka Dot Door, and a group album called Canada's Favorite Folksongs for Kids.

== Commercial performance ==
The album was the fastest-selling Canadian children's record ever, at the time.

The first printing of the album had 5000 copies. In its first three months, by mid-December 1978, the album had sold over 27,000 copies. By April 1979, a press mention listed the number as having grown to 100,000 copies, although an interview with the group in June contradicted that, listing 47,000 sales. It had sold 100,000 copies by at least December 1980. It was certified as a Gold Album in September 1979 (50,000+ copies sold), a Platinum Album in December 1980 (100,000+ copies), and Double Platinum on 18 November 1986 (200,000+ copies).

== Track listing ==
1. "Cookie Jar"
2. "She'll Be Coming Round the Mountain"
3. "Flea Fly Mosquito"
4. "Five Little Monkeys"
5. "Going to Kentucky"
6. "Turkey in the Straw"
7. "Candy Man, Salty Dog"
8. ""A", You're Adorable"
9. "Bee Bee Bumblebee"
10. "The Old Sow"
11. "The Wind"
12. "Skinnamarink (1978)"
13. "Gavotte" (by J.S. Bach)
14. "Michaud"
15. "Inky Pinky Ponky"
16. "Tingalayo"
17. "Elephant Rhyme"
18. "One Elephant, Deux Elephants"
19. "Ho Ho Watanay (Iroquois Lullaby)"
20. "Little Tommy Tinker"
21. "One Potato, Two Potato"
22. "Old John Braddelum"
23. "Is There Anybody Here?"
24. "Paw-Paw Patch"
25. "In the Land of Oz"
26. "Looby Loo"
27. "John, John the Leprechaun"
28. "Shoo Be De Doop"
29. "Monday Night the Banjo"
30. "Yes Sir, You're My Baby"
31. "I'm Not Small"
32. "Five Little Fishies"
33. "Star Light, Star Bright / Bye 'n Bye / Twinkle, Twinkle Little Star"
34. "Bed Bugs"
35. "Skinnamarink (1997)"

== Release history ==
- 1978 (Elephant Records/A&M Records) "One Elephant, Deux Éléphants"
- 1985 (A&M Records) "One Elephant" (Cassette & CD)
- 1990 (A&M Records) "One Elephant" (LP Record)
- 1995 (Elephant Records) "One Elephant, Deux Éléphants"
- 1995 (Drive Entertainment) "One Elephant Went Out to Play"
- 2002 (Casablanca Kids Inc.) "One Elephant, Deux Éléphants" (25th Anniversary Ed.)
- 2004/2005/2008 (Casablanca Kids Inc.) "One Elephant, Deux Éléphants"

The Casablanca Kids Inc. edition featured three additional extra songs that did not appear on any of the previous releases. The three songs added to the 25 Years Anniversary Edition were: "A, You're Adorable", "Five Little Fishies", and "Skinnamarink" (1998 Version).

The first release of the album cost $7.98, more than the average children's album of the era, which sold for $2.98 to $3.98. The lower price point meant a lack of interest from the recording industry, and lack of quality product. The album was viewed as part of a turning point for the industry.
