= Getting to Know You (song) =

1951 show tune

Song
- Published: 1951
- Composer: Richard Rodgers
- Lyricist: Oscar Hammerstein II

"Getting to Know You" is a show tune from the 1951 Rodgers and Hammerstein musical The King and I. It was first sung by Gertrude Lawrence in the original Broadway production and later by Marni Nixon who dubbed for Deborah Kerr in the 1956 film adaptation. In the show, Anna, a British schoolteacher who has been hired as a governess, sings the song as she strikes up a warm and affectionate relationship with the children and the wives of the King of Siam.

This song is one of the cases during the Rodgers and Hammerstein partnership when Rodgers re-used a melody he had written for an earlier show and then discarded. In this case the melody was a tune he wrote for South Pacific, called "Suddenly Lovely", which he originally intended for the character of Nellie to sing but replaced it with the song "(I'm in Love with) a Wonderful Guy". Mary Martin, the star of South Pacific, who had proposed that Rodgers should cast Yul Brynner as the King, reminded Rodgers of this tune, and so Hammerstein wrote new lyrics to it.

== Notable recordings ==
- Gertrude Lawrence - part of the Broadway cast recording The King and I. (1951).
- Bing Crosby - recorded April 9, 1951 with Victor Young and His Orchestra.
- Dinah Shore - a 1951 single release for RCA Victor (catalog No. 47-4286).
- Deborah Kerr, Marni Nixon & Children's Chorus - The King And I (Original Motion Picture Soundtrack) (1956).
- Della Reese - in the album A Date with Della Reese at Mr. Kelly's in Chicago (1958).
- Andy Williams - included in his album Andy Williams Sings Rodgers and Hammerstein (1958).
- Johnny Mathis - for his album Romantically (1963).
- Doris Day - included in her album With a Smile and a Song (1964)
- Nancy Wilson - included in her album Broadway – My Way (1964).
- Barbara Cook - included in the album The King and I (Studio Cast, 1964).
- Sajid Khan - single (Colgems #1026) peaked at #108 on Billboard (1968).
- James Taylor - for the charity CD For Our Children (1991).
- Leon Redbone sang the song in ads for the Chevrolet Geo (1991).
- Julie Andrews - included in the album The King and I (1992).
- Count von Count - "Getting To Count You", a Sesame Street spoof of the song (1994).
- Sharon, Lois & Bram - for their album Friends Forever (1998).
- Elaine Paige - included in the album The King and I: 2000 London Cast Recording (2000).
- Erin Damers with the 2nd Grade Chorus of Frank J. Carasiti Elementary School in Rocky Point, New York - in the concert "300 Years of Music" (2004)
- NRBQ - included on their album Brass Tacks (2014).
- Kelli O'Hara - included in the album The King and I (The 2015 Broadway Cast Recording) (2015).

== Other appearances ==
- 1978 The One and Only.
- 1990 Twin Peaks - Leland Palmer
- Early to Mid 1990s - Geo (GM Auto Brand) Advertising Campaign
- 1991 The Addams Family
- 1999 Spaced
- 2002 King of Queens - Arthur, Spooner
- 2003 Unconditional Love - performed by Julie Andrews.
- 2015 Orange is the New Black - End-credits S3E8
- 2022 Pam and Tommy
