= One More Hour =

One More Hour may refer to:

- One More Hour, a 1974 album by Gayle McCormick
- "One More Hour", a song by Fuzzy Duck from the 1971 album Fuzzy Duck
- "One More Hour", a song by Robert Görl, 2000
- "One More Hour", a song by Sharon, Lois & Bram from the 1995 album Sing Around the Campfire
- "One More Hour", a song by Sleater-Kinney from the 1997 album Dig Me Out
- "One More Hour", a song by Tame Impala from the 2020 album The Slow Rush
- "One More Hour", a song by The Killjoys from the 1990 album Ruby
- "One More Hour", a song written by Randy Newman and sung by Jennifer Warnes from the 1981 film Ragtime
- "One More Hour", a song written by Patrick Doyle from the 2003 film Calendar Girls
- One More Hour, a 1989 book by Desmond J. Scott
