= Friends Forever (Sharon, Lois & Bram album) =

Studio album by Sharon, Lois & Bram
- Released: April 1998
- Recorded: Inception Sound: Toronto, ON
- Genre: Children's music
- Length: 54:00
- Label: Skinnamarink Entertainment
- Producers: Lynn Harvey, Richard Mortimer, & Sharon, Lois & Bram

Sharon, Lois & Bram chronology
| Wild About Animals (1997) | Friends Forever (1998) | Skinnamarink TV (1998) |

Friends Forever is the 19th album by popular children's entertainers Sharon, Lois & Bram, originally released in April 1998. Hitting the shelves just in time for Easter, Friends Forever was the first of the trio's albums to be released under their new Skinnamarink Entertainment group featuring songs from a few select episodes from the first season of their hit-television series "Skinnamarink TV" which aired on CBC in Canada and The Learning Channel in the United States during the Ready Set Learn! block on weekday mornings.

The album featured a newer, unheard side of the children's trio and seemed to be aimed at a slightly younger audience than their previous albums. Yet, the album featured many classic songs such as "Getting to Know You" from The King & I, "Papa Loves Mambo", and "I'd Do Anything" from the musical Oliver!.

== Releases ==
Friends Forever is available on cassette, CD and VHS. Officially only released in Canada, this album was available in the United States through the trio's online catalog and website at the time. Their previous U.S. Distributor, Drive Entertainment, came to a close and the trio's products hence became harder to find in the United States, this being the first album. The album in a nutshell is "about friendship, sharing and cooperation, featuring stories and songs that will warm your hear and tickle your funny bone"

The cassette is much harder to find than the CD, which itself is rare to come across. The album was released, as stated before, under the trio's, then, new company, Skinnamarink Entertainment in partnership with the Canadian Kids Motion distributor, a "Coscient Group Company".

== Home video ==
To help promote the album, the trio released a 50-minute home video of the same name featuring two episodes from their television series, "Skinnamarink TV", which held most of the songs found on the album. The two episodes that are on the video are titled "Cooperation" and "Friendship", and are both found in Season One of the show.

"If music and laughter are what you're after, tune into Skinnamarink TV, the TV station just for kids starring your musical friends Sharon, Lois & Bram. Joined by Ella Acapella and C.C. Copycat, [the trio] sing, dance and laugh their way through a whole day's worth of television programs. And so will you! Everybody gets to watch their favorite show on Skinnamarink TV!". Not all the songs that are on the album can be found on the video.

== Accolades ==
Our Choice Award - Canadian Children's Book Center (1998)

== Promotions ==
With the release of their new TV series at the time, Friends Forever did not receive as much publicity as previous Sharon, Lois & Bram albums had. However, on a previous video release titled "Op Op Opposites", there was a short video advertisement for the Friends Forever video. A copy of this advertisement can be found on YouTube at https://www.youtube.com/watch?v=YgiPE1OztZQ.

== Track listing ==
1. "Skinnamarink TV Theme"*
2. "She'll Be Comin' Round the Mountain"
3. "Hokey Pokey"
4. "Cooking Breakfast For the Ones I Love"
5. "I Love Onions"
6. "Isn't It Grand"
7. "Pufferbellies"
8. "You Made Me A Pallet On the Floor"*
9. "The Rest of the Day's Your Own"
10. "I'd Do Anything"*
11. "Los Pollitos Dicen"
12. "But I Like You"*
13. "Five Green Apples"
14. "Candy Man, Salty Dog"*
15. "Getting to Know You"*
16. "Little Red Hen"*
17. "I Found A Little Rooster"
18. "Papa Loves Mambo"
19. "A Flea and a Fly In A Flue"*
20. "Great Big Muscles"
21. "Rags"*
22. "Icky Lollipop"
23. "Ha-Ha, This-A-Way"*
24. "Skinnamarink"*

*These songs plus one additional song, "Bingo" are found on the Friends Forever VHS tape.
