= Kensington Sound =

General information
- Location: 170 Baldwin St, Toronto, ON M5T 1L8, Canada

Website
- https://kensingtonsound.studio/

Kensington Sound is a recording studio located in the Kensington Market area of Toronto, Ontario, Canada. Founded by musician and producer Vezi Tayyeb, the studio has hosted numerous Canadian and international artists and has had a long history in the development of the Toronto music scene.

== History ==
Kensington Sound was established in 1972 in Toronto's Kensington Market. The studio gained recognition for combining vintage analog recording equipment with modern digital technology, attracting a wide range of artists. It celebrated its 50th anniversary in 2022.

== Artists ==
Notable artists who have recorded at Kensington Sound include Snoop Dogg, Sharon, Lois & Bram, Harlow and Look People.
