= Sing Around the Campfire =

Studio album by Sharon, Lois & Bram
- Released: 1995
- Genre: Children's music
- Length: 39:00
- Labels: Elephant Records; Drive Entertainment

Sharon, Lois & Bram chronology
Club-E Collection (1994)	''Sing Around the Campfire'' (1995)	Sharon, Lois & Bram Sampler (1995)

Alternative cover
- Songs For Round the Campfire Edition (1994)

Sing Around the Campfire is the 16th album by children's entertainers Sharon, Lois & Bram, originally released in 1995. This album is a collection of songs for round the campfire. This is the third official compilation from the Sharon, Lois & Bram collection. Not only is Sing Around the Campfire an album, but it is also a 50-minute home video under the same name.

== Releases ==
Sing Around the Campfire was originally released in 1994 in Canada under the name Songs for Round the Campfire under Sharon, Lois & Bram's original company label Elephant Records Inc. In 1995, with the Drive Entertainment catalog, they changed the name and re-released the album. Both editions have the same cover artwork, just with the different titles. Also, both editions feature the same tracks.

1994 Elephant Records
1995 Drive Entertainment Inc.

== Nominations & Awards ==
Our Choice Award - Canadian Children's Book Center (1994)

== Home Video ==
Home Video VHS - Drive Entertainment Inc.

In 1995, with the USA Drive Entertainment Inc. release, a video of the same name was produced and available for purchase through the Drive Catalog as well at Sharon, Lois & Bram concerts promoting the album. The 50-minute video featured Sharon, Lois & Bram, Elephant and a gang of kids going camping for the weekend and reminiscing about camping trips of the past. The video featured clips from the trio's critically acclaimed television show: Sharon, Lois & Bram's Elephant Show as well as newly recorded footage specially shot for the video. The video featured songs from the album, as well as a few additional Sharon, Lois & Bram favorites.

The overall plot of the story is "when you can’t get to the park, let a friendly Elephant take your kids camping! Join in the fun on opening day at Club-E Camp. Learn camp lessons and more, sing-along to more than 25 Sharon, Lois & Bram hiking and camping favorites. Share the fun with this collection of Sharon, Lois & Bram favorites"

At the end of the video, there is a short five-minute advertisement of the Drive Entertainment Catalog featuring Sharon, Lois & Bram. It features the voices of Sharon, Lois & Bram speaking about their various albums and videos released and available through Drive Entertainment. It also features a clip from their Christmas television special/home video Candles, Snow & Mistletoe as well as the introduction to Sharon, Lois & Bram's Elephant Show.

"This over-to-soon video serves up songs, songs [and more] songs - fast, slow, silly and soulful- from "Skip to My Loo" and "Mairzy Doats" to "Jump Josie" and "We're All Together Again" - plus rhythmic finger and word play and bits of business with "Elephant", the group's mascot, who has to be persuaded that camping is fun... Shot outdoors in sumptuous nature settings, with lots of children for viewers to relate to, the video is a deft mix of old and new footage, with the passing of time only revealed by Sharon and Lois' changing hairstyles and the hue of Bram's beard. Otherwise, the three are remarkably the same. By the time the trio sings their signature song, "Skinnamarink", night has fallen, the marshmallows have been toasted and the campfire is burning low."

== Touring & Promotions ==
To promote the release of Sing Around the Campfire and "Songs for Round the Campfire", Sharon, Lois and Bram embarked on a short and simple summer-tour of the United States and Canada. The concerts had a "summertime, sit-around-on-the-back-porch kind of atmosphere.". The concerts also featured the trio's mascot and pachyderm pal, Elephant. The album and video were available at the concerts for purchase.

== Track listing ==
The following is a list of the tracks found on the CD/Cassette release.

1. "Mister Sun"
2. "Bingo"
3. "The Smile on the Crocodile"
4. "Dirty Old Bill"
5. "Jump Josie / Skip to My Loo"
6. "Sarah the Whale"
7. "Down in the Valley"
8. "A You're Adorable"
9. "Pufferbellies"
10. "Up in the Air, Jr. Birdsmen"
11. "Jumping Joan"
12. "Star Light, Star Bright / Bye 'n Bye / Twinkle, Twinkle Little Star"
13. "Rain Medley"
14. "We're All Together Again"
15. "Chicken Medley
16. "Acorn Brown"
17. "Mairzy Doats"
18. "Fish & Chips & Vinegar"
19. "Do Your Ears Hang Low?"
20. "Michael Finnegan"
21. "She'll Be Coming Round the Mountain"
22. "I Had An Old Coat"
23. "Hey Dum Diddeley Dum"
24. "You Made Me a Pallet On the Floor"
25. "Skinnamarink"

The following is a list of tracks found on the home video:

1. "Mister Sun"
2. "Jump Josie"
3. "Floating Down the River"
4. "Skip to My Loo"
5. "Looby Loo"
6. "Flea, Fly, Mosquito"
7. "I Don't Want no More of Camping Life"
8. "Swimming Pool"
9. "How Much Wood Would A Woodchuck Chuck?"
10. "Acorn Brown"
11. "Up In the Air, Jr. Birdsmen"
12. "Mairzy Doats"
13. "If All the Raindrops"
14. "We're All Together Again"
15. "Fish & Chips & Vinegar"
16. "Do Your Ears Hang Low?"
17. "Home on the Range"
18. "Frere Jacques"
19. "One More Hour"
20. "That's What the Daisy Said"
21. "I Had An Old Coat"
22. "You Made Me a Pallet on the Floor"
23. "Skinnamarink" (One More Song)
24. "Bye 'n Bye" (EXTRA)
25. "Jingle Bells" (SUPER EXTRA)
26. "One Elephant Went Out to Play (MEGA EXTRA)

== Additional Links ==
https://www.imdb.com/title/tt0954974/
