= Eileen Barton =

American singer (1924–2006)

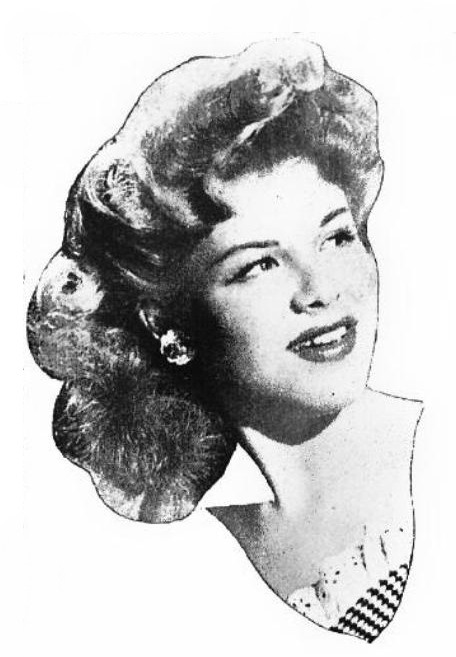
- Barton in 1944

Background information
- Born: November 24, 1924; New York City, U.S.
- Died: June 27, 2006 (aged 81) West Hollywood, California, U.S.
- Genres: Traditional pop
- Years active: 1930–1980
- Labels: Capitol, National, Mercury, Coral

Eileen Barton (November 24, 1924 – June 27, 2006) was an American singer best known for her 1950 hit song, "If I Knew You Were Comin' I'd've Baked a Cake."

== Early years ==
Barton was born in Brooklyn, New York. Her birthdate is often given as 1929, but a certified copy of her birth certificate shows that she was born in 1924. This was done commonly, to shave a few years from a performer's age.

Eileen's parents, Benny and Elsie Barton, were vaudeville performers. She first appeared in her parents' act in Kansas City at age 2½, when she allegedly sang "Ain't Misbehavin'," as a dare to her parents from columnist (and later radio star) Goodman Ace. (Since the song was not written until 1929, this story is perhaps apocryphal.) At 3½, she appeared at the Palace Theater, doing two shows a day as part of comedian Ted Healy's routine (Healy would go on to put together The Three Stooges).

== Radio ==
Barton soon became a child star. By age 6, she appeared on The Horn and Hardart Children's Hour, a radio program sponsored by Horn & Hardart's Automat, a then-well-known restaurant chain, and, by age 7, in 1936–37, she was working with Milton Berle on his Community Sing radio program, using the name "Jolly Gillette" and playing the sponsor's "daughter" (the sponsor was Gillette Razors). She would ask to sing, he would tell her she couldn't, and she would remind him that her daddy was the sponsor, so he'd let her sing a current hit song. She also was a regular on The Milton Berle Show in 1939.

At 8, she had a daily singing program of her own on radio station WMCA, Arnold's Dinner Club. At 10, she appeared twice on Rudy Vallée's network radio program in 1936. She also acted on radio series such as Death Valley Days.

At age 11, she left show business briefly. At age 14 she went on the Broadway stage as an understudy to Nancy Walker in Best Foot Forward, followed by an appearance under her own name with Elaine Stritch in Angel in the Wings.

At age 15, she appeared as a guest singer on a Johnny Mercer variety series, leading to her being noticed by Frank Sinatra, who took her under his wing and put her in a regular spot on the CBS radio show that he hosted in the 1940s. She co-starred on Sinatra's show beginning August 16, 1944, and was also part of Sinatra's act at the Paramount Theater in 15 appearances there. She also appeared on her own and as a guest performer with such stars as Duke Ellington, Count Basie, Nat King Cole, and Danny Kaye.

In 1945, Barton had her own radio program, Teen Timers. That November, the program's name was changed to The Eileen Barton Show. It was broadcast Saturday mornings on NBC.

In 1954, she starred in The Eileen Barton Show, a 13-episode transcribed program for the United States Marine Corps.

== Television ==
Barton was a regular performer on The Swift Show in 1948, on Broadway Open House in 1951, and on The Bill Goodwin Show in 1951–52. She also appeared in 1961-62 as the "assistant mayor" of the TV game shows Video Village and Video Village, Jr..

== Recording ==
Barton's first appearance on record was as part of a V-Disc 12" issued for servicemen, where she sang two cuts ("Great Day" and "Lover, Come Back"). The disc was shared with Frank Sinatra's "I Have But One Heart."

Her first appearance on a normal record available to the general public was "They Say It's Wonderful" (b/w "You Brought A New Kind of Love To Me") for Mercury in 1946. After cutting a second single ("As If I Didn't Have Enough On My Mind" b/w "One-zy Two-zy") she recorded one single for Capitol Records, "Would You Believe Me?" (b/w "A Thousand And One Nights") (catalog number 402), with the orchestra of Lyle "Skitch" Henderson, in 1948.

She met success when she moved to National Records the following year and recorded "If I Knew You Were Comin' I'd've Baked a Cake" (written by Bob Merrill, Albert Hoffman and Al Trace; Trace used the pseudonym Clem Watts) and introduced it on Don McNeill's radio program, The Breakfast Club. On the record, Trace's band musicians backed her, but were given billing as "The New Yorkers." It was first released by National Records, a small New York–based label, mostly specializing in rhythm & blues records, as catalog number 9103. When National's owner, Al Green, decided it had become too big a seller for National to handle, the record was later distributed by Mercury Records, whose co-owner was Al Green's son, Irving Green. The record became one of the best-selling records on an independent label of all time, charting at #1 best selling in stores for 2 weeks and most played by jockeys for 10 weeks, and altogether on the Billboard charts for over four months.

In a 2005 interview for the liner notes of her Jasmine Records CD release, Barton indicated that she never received a penny in royalties from either National or Mercury for her record's success, although by contract she was supposed to receive 5% of each sale.

After the success of this record, she became a nightclub and stage performer, appearing at all the important clubs in New York City and many others. In the 1950s, she was a featured singer with Guy Lombardo and his orchestra.

She moved to Coral Records in 1951 and charted with some cover versions of songs that were bigger hits for other artists, such as "Cry", "Sway", "Pretend", and others.

In 1956, Barton moved to Epic Records. However, rock-and-roll quickly drove most singers of her generation from the charts and her chart hits dried up in the late '50s. After releasing singles for another four record labels, she retired from studio work in 1963. Despite 17 years of recording, Barton never produced an LP and her recorded output consisted entirely of singles and EPs.

She also appeared in motion pictures and television, and continued to perform live until the early 1980s.

== Personal life ==
Barton married industrialist Dan Shaw in Juarez, Mexico, April 15, 1961. She divorced Lawrence Kane, a salesman and career criminal who is a suspect in the Zodiac Killer murders.

== Death ==
Barton died at her West Hollywood home from ovarian cancer at the age of 81. She had no children and was not married at the time of her death.

== Hit records ==
Year	Single	US Chart
1950	"If I Knew You Were Comin' (I'd've Baked a Cake)"	1
1950	"May I Take Two Giant Steps?"	25
1951	"Cry"	10
1952	"Wishin'"	30
1953	"Pretend"	17
1953	"Don't Let the Stars Get in Your Eyes"	24
1953	"Toys"	21
1954	"Don't Ask Me Why"	25
1954	"Pine Tree, Pine over Me"	26
1954	"Sway (¿Quién será?)"	21
