= Great Big Hits =

Greatest hits album by Sharon, Lois & Bram
- Released: September 22, 1992
- Genre: Children's music
- Length: 62:12
- Labels: Elephant Records; A&M Records; Casablanca Kids Inc.

Sharon, Lois & Bram chronology
Kidbits (1992)	Great Big Hits (1992)	Songs in the Key of Kids (1993)

Songbook
- Songbook (1993)

Great Big Hits is the 11th album by popular children's entertainers Sharon, Lois & Bram, originally released in 1992. The album features 31 favorite Sharon, Lois & Bram songs, most released on previous albums, although the trio did re-recorded several songs especially for this album to give them more of a "Sharon, Lois & Bram sound".

== Releases ==
The original release was in 1992 under Elephant Records in Canada, and under A&M Records in the United States. Then in 2004, Great Big Hits was re-released under Casablanca Kids Inc. The album is also available in a 2-Disc BoxSet released by Casablanca Kids in 2004.

1992 (Elephant Records/A&M Records)Cassette/CD
2004/2005/2008 (Casablanca Kids Inc.) CD

== Touring and promotions ==
To promote the album, Sharon, Lois & Bram launched their "Great Big Tour" across Canada and the United States, presented by Nickelodeon US and Eaton's Canada. Pictures from the tour can be seen in the Sharon, Lois & Bram Photo Album that was published to sell at Great Big Hits concerts. The Great Big Tour sold over 200,000 seats across North America.

They also released a mini-compilation album to promote Great Big Hits. It was titled Kidbits and featured a selection of songs from their earlier albums as well as a special Skinnamarink Introduction where the trio personally welcomes you to the album and gives a brief description of their career and what to expect in terms of the Great Big Hits album. It is available only on cassette.

Great Big Hits proved that Sharon, Lois & Bram were rising stars and were an upward trend in popularity at the time because the album only took 2 months to "go gold", whereas their previous album, Sing A to Z, released in 1990, took 2 years to "go gold".

In addition, a Songbook titled "Great Big Hits" was published by Warner-Chappell Music in 1993. It contains piano music, guitar chords, and lyrics to all of the songs found on the album, as well as a special 4-Hand Skinnamarink Duet for the piano.

== Nominations and awards ==
- Our Choice Award, Canadian Children's Book Centre (1992)
- iParenting Media Awards, Hottest Product for 2004 (2004)
- Parents Choice, Recommended (2004)
- Gold

== Track listing ==
1. "One Elephant"*
2. "She'll Be Coming Round the Mountain"*
3. "Peanut Butter & Jelly"*
4. "Jenny Jenkins"*
5. "Chugga-Chugga"*
6. "Savez-Vous Planter Les Choux?"
7. "If I Could Have A Windmill"
8. "A You're Adorable"*
9. "Pop! Goes the Weasel"
10. "Grandpa's Farm"
11. "Susannah's A Funny Old Man"
12. "Five Brown Buns"
13. "We're All Together Again / If I Knew You Were Coming I'd've Baked A Cake"
14. "Newfoundland Jig Medley"
15. "Little Rabbit Foo-Foo"
16. "Five Little Monkeys"
17. "Tingalayo"*
18. "Hey Dum Diddeley Dum"*
19. "How Much Is That Doggie in the Window?"
20. "Rags"*
21. "Fish & Chips & Vinegar"
22. "The Smile on the Crocodile"
23. "Ballin' the Jack"
24. "Candy Man, Salty Dog"
25. "Pufferbellies"
26. "The Eensy Weensy Spider"
27. "Mommy, What If..."
28. "Shoe A Little Horse"
29. "Caballito Blanco"
30. "Little Sir Echo"
31. "Precious Friends / Skinnamarink"
- Tracks 1, 2, 17 from One Elephant, Deux Elephants
- [*] Re-recordings
