= Sharon, Lois & Bram's Elephant Show Record =

Studio album by Sharon, Lois & Bram
- Released: 1986
- Genre: Children's music
- Length: 38:00
- Label: Elephant Records; Drive Entertainment

Sharon, Lois & Bram chronology
Mainly Mother Goose (1984)	Sharon, Lois & Bram's Elephant Show Record (1986)	Stay Tuned (1987)

Alternative cover
- Elephant Records Edition (1993)

Alternative cover
- Drive Entertainment Edition (1994)

Alternative cover
- Casablanca Kids Inc. Edition (2009)

Sharon, Lois & Bram's Elephant Show Record is the seventh album by popular children's entertainers Sharon, Lois & Bram, originally released in 1986. The album features songs from Seasons 1 and 2 what would become their hit TV series "Sharon, Lois & Bram's Elephant Show".

== Releases ==
The original album was only issued on cassette and record featuring a picture of the trio in the park and Elephant on the set of a television. But when Drive Entertainment began re-releasing the trio's albums, they changed the cover, featuring only Elephant. The 1986 release came with a color picture fold-out that had words to all the songs.

Originally the title was Sharon, Lois & Bram's Elephant Show, but when it was re-packed and re-released in 1993 under Elephant Records, the name was changed to The Elephant Show Volume 1 and then again in 1994, under Drive Entertainment, they cut out Volume 1 and the title became just The Elephant Show.

1986 (Elephant Records) LP Record/Cassette
1993 (Elephant Records) Cassette/CD
1994 (Drive Entertainment) (USA) Cassette/CD

Casablanca Kids Inc. recently re-released the original album under the same name. The CD is out in stores in Canada as of the week of August 17, 2009. The cover art features the same picture as the 1986 (original) release, but a new font for the trio's names will replace the original text. This will be the first time this album has been released onto CD under its original name, "Sharon, Lois & Bram's Elephant Show Record".

== Home Video ==
In 1994, Drive Entertainment released a video featuring the songs from the album. It runs for approximately 50 minutes and contains clips from Sharon, Lois & Bram's Elephant Show. It is available only on VHS.

== Nominations & Awards ==
Platinum

== Track listing ==
1. "One Elephant Went Out to Play"
2. "Chugga-Chugga"
3. "Everybody Happy?"
4. "Five Plump Peas"
5. "Jelly, Jelly In My Belly"
6. "Five Brown Buns"
7. "On A Picnic We Will Go"
8. "London Bridge"
9. "Noah's Old Ark"
10. "Jack Was Every Inch A Sailor"
11. "Ten in the Bed"
12. "There Was An Old Woman Tossed Up in A Basket"
13. "Three Craw"
14. "Rig-a-Jig-Jig"
15. "Going to the Zoo"
16. "Go to Sleep Now, My Pumpkin"
17. "Where's My Pajamas?"
18. "Hi-Dee-Ho"
19. "Take Me Out to the Ballgame / Bravo Bravissimo"
20. "Ballin' the Jack"
21. "The Wheels On the Bus"
22. "Horsey, Horsey"
23. "There's A Little Wheel A-Turnin' In My Heart"
24. "Skinnamarink"
