= One, Two, Three, Four, Live! =

Live album by Sharon, Lois & Bram
- Released: 1982
- Genre: Family Music
- Length: 45:52
- Labels: Elephant Records; A&M Records; Universal Music Canada
- Producer: Bill Usher

Sharon, Lois & Bram chronology
In the Schoolyard (1981)	One, Two, Three, Four, Live! (1982)	Mainly Mother Goose (1984)

One, Two, Three, Four, Live! is the fifth album by popular Family entertainers Sharon, Lois & Bram, originally released in 1982. The recording was re-released in 1996 under the title "In Concert". It's available on Cassette, LP Record and CD

== Releases ==
Released 1982 (Elephant Records) "One, Two, Three, Four, Look Who's Coming Through the Door!"
Released 1983 (A&M Records/Elephant Records) "One, Two, Three, Four, Live!"
Released 1996 (Elephant Records) "One, Two, Three, Four, Live!"
Re- releasing on April 15, 2016 (Universal Music Canada) "1234 Live!".

This is the trio's only Live-In-Concert Album (Live in Concert With The Mammoth Band) What a thrill everyone had.

== Nominations & Awards ==
ALA Notable Children's Recordings (1983)

== Track listing ==
1. "Opening Medley"
2. "Apple Picker's Reel"
3. "Old Texas"
4. "Pufferbellies"
5. "If I Could Have A Windmill"
6. "Shanty Medley"
7. "Where is Thumbkin?"
8. "Jada Jin"
9. "Candy Man, Salty Dog"
10. "A Biscuit"
11. "Little Tommy Tinker"
12. "La Bastringue"
13. "Side By Side"
14. "Promises to Keep"
15. "Skinnamarink"
