= All the Fun You Can Sing! =

Studio album by Sharon, Lois & Bram
- Released: 1993
- Genre: Children's music
- Length: 42:00
- Labels: Elephant Records; Drive Entertainment

Sharon, Lois & Bram chronology
Candles Long Ago (1993)	All the Fun You Can Sing! (1993)	Club-E Collection (1994)

All the Fun You Can Sing! is the 15th album by popular children's entertainers Sharon, Lois & Bram, originally released in 1993. This album features some of Sharon, Lois & Bram's favorite songs, perfect for "on the way and when you get there". This is the second official compilation from the Sharon, Lois & Bram collection. To this day, this particular album of the trio's remains one of the hardest to find.

== Touring & Promotions ==
To promote the US release of All the Fun You Can Sing!, Sharon, Lois & Bram embarked on a summer-tour of the United States. The albums were available at the concerts for purchase.

This is also where the first plush stuffed Elephants were available.

== Releases ==
The original release was in 1993 under Elephant Records in Canada, and then in 1994 under Drive Entertainment in the United States. It is available only on cassette and CD, although an early catalog of the trio's mistakenly reported there was a video as well. The original 1993 Elephant Records release featured just the trio on the cover, without Elephant in the background. When it was re-released by Drive Entertainment in 1994, Elephant was introduced standing behind the trio. The original Elephant Records edition is extremely hard to find.

1993 Elephant Records
1994 Drive Entertainment Inc.

== Track listing ==
1. "Everybody Happy?"
2. "Ha-Ha, This-a-Way"
3. "Cheerio"
4. "Up in the Air, Jr. Birdsmen"
5. "Miss Lucy"
6. "Pufferbellies"
7. "Doctor Knickerbocker"
8. "Grandpa's Farm"
9. "Gatgoon"
10. "There Was a Little Man"
11. "She'll Be Comin' 'Round the Mountain"
12. "Peanut Butter & Jelly"
13. "Acorn Brown"
14. "Mairzy Doats"
15. "Fish & Chips & Vinegar"
16. "Tzena, Tzena"
17. "Chicken Medley"
18. "Move Over"
19. "Sarah the Whale"
20. "A Biscuit"
21. "Long-Legged Sailor"
22. "The Smile on the Crocodile"
23. "Susannah's a Funny Old Man"
24. "Alphabet Medley"
25. "John Jacob Jingleheimer Schmidt"
26. "Once I Saw Three Goats"
27. "Five Little Monkeys"
28. "Where's My Pajamas?"
29. "Apple Picker's Reel"
