= Little Sir Echo =

Single by Multiple
- Released: 1917, 1939
- Songwriters: Laura Rountree Smith, John Sylvester Fearis, Adele Girard, Joe Marsala

"Little Sir Echo" is a song originally composed in 1917 by John Sylvester Fearis with lyrics by Laura Rountree Smith. It became popular in the 1920s and 1930s as children's camp song. In 1939, Adele Girard and Joe Marsala wrote a revised version with a new arrangement and additional verse; the revised version was recorded by at least 22 artists in 1939, including versions by Horace Heidt, Bing Crosby, Gene Autry, Doris Day, Guy Lombardo, and other big bands. It became one of the biggest hits of 1939 and has since been covered by additional artists, including Jonah Jones with Roy Eldridge, Jerry Lewis, Louis Prima, Joe Williams, The Bonzo Dog Band, and The Wiggles.

== Original version ==
John Sylvester Fearis, the original composer, came to Chicago from Iowa in the early 1900s and was known principally as the composer of hymns and sacred music. He composed "Little Sir Echo" in approximately 1917 with Laura Rountree Smith of Wisconsin writing the lyrics. No known recordings have been found of the original version. Fearis and his brother owned a music publishing firm and bought the rights to the verse from Smith. The Fearis brothers then published the song in a collection of "unison songs for Children." It was also included in "The Song Book of the Y.W.C.A" in 1926, and it became a popular camp song and sing-along in the 1920s and 1930s.

== Girard and Marsala adaptation ==
Swing harpist and songwriter Adele Girard remembered the song from her youth singing around the campfire as a Girl Scout in Massachusetts. In the late 1930s, Girard and her husband Joe Marsala, a swing clarinetist and the leader of the orchestra in which Girard played, collaborated on a "modernized" version of the song with a new arrangement and an extra verse. They introduced their new version of the song at the Hickory House in New York, and it was then published. The new version was released in January 1939 by Horace Heidt and was covered the same year by multiple artists, including Bing Crosby, Guy Lombardo, Doris Day, Mantovani, Bebe Daniels, and Eddy Howard. Many of the 1939 releases were by big bands of the day, but there were also country music versions released by Gene Autry and Riley Puckett.

By July 1939, 250,000 copies of the sheet music had been sold. It rose to No. 2 on Your Hit Parade in April 1939 and became one of the year's most popular ballroom and radio hits. Autry's version reached No. 1 on the Billboard hillbilly chart and remained on the chart for 13 weeks. Crosby's version rose to No.3 on the Billboard pop chart.

Foreign language versions were also released in Danish, Dutch, French, and German. The song was later covered by many notable artists, including Jerry Lewis, Tony Randall, Louis Prima, The Bonzo Dog Band, and The Wiggles.

== Lyrics ==
The song's lyrics represent a callout to a personified echo ("Little Sir Echo"). The singer asks "how do you do" and invites the echo to come over and play, noting that "you're always so far away."

== Notable recordings ==
Notable recorded versions include:

1939 recordings

- Horace Heidt and his Musical Knights, Brunswick 8309 (1939)
- Bing Crosby with John Scott Trotter and His Orchestra, Decca 2385 (1939)
- Gene Autry, Vocalion 4809 (1939)
- Guy Lombardo and His Royal Canadians, Decca 2306A (1939)
- Riley Puckett singing with mandolin, guitar and accordion, Bluebird B-8258-A (1939)
- Fin Olsen with the Master Melodists, Polydor (1939)
- Harry Roy & His Orchestra, Parlophone F1451 (1939)
- Jan Savitt and His Tophatters, Decca 2391A (1939)
- Doris Day with the Barney Rapp Orchestra (1939)
- Mantovani & His Orchestra (1939)
- Billy Cotton and His Band, Rex No. 9540 (1939)
- Bebe Daniels and Ben Lyon with the Three Ginx and Orchestra, Decca F.7063 (1939)
- Ambrose and His Orchestra (vocal chorus by Vera Lynn & Denny Dennis (1939)
- Dick Jurgens and His Orchestra, vocal chorus Eddy Howard (1939)
- Herman Darewski & His Band, Odeon OF 4972 (1939)
- Geraldo and His Orchestra (1939)
- Gray Gordon and His Tic-Tock Rhythm Orchestra, vocals by Cliff Grass, Chet Bruce (1939)
- Dick Todd, baritone with orchestra and "The Three Reasons" (girls trio), Bluebird B-10169-A (1939)
- Rina Ketty with orchestra directed by Marcel Cariven (French), Pathé Records PA 1881 (1939)
- Joe Loss and His Band, vocal by Chick Henderson, Regal Zonophone MR 3048 (1939)
- Wayne King & His Orchestra, His Master's Voice E.A. 2340 (1939)
- Les Allen with novelty accompaniment, Columbia FB 2233 (1939)
- Eddy Duchin with vocal by child singer Durelle Alexander

Later recordings

- Teddy Peterson, refrain by Valdemar Davis (German version called "Lille Herr Ekko), Polyphon S.S. 50759 B (1940)
- Jonah Jones & His Orchestra, instrumental version with Roy Eldridge on trumpet (1945)
- Jimmy Boyd with Paul Weston & His Orchestra, Columbia 4-40304 (1954)
- Betty Wells & Jimmy West with the Peter Pan Orchestra, Peter Pan Records (1956)
- Max Bygraves, His Master's Voice No. B.10408 (1953)
- Rex Stewart and Dickie Wells, on their 1959 album Chatter Jazz: The Talkative Horns of Rex Stewart & Dickie Wells, RCA Victor LSP-2024
- Floyd Robinson, RCA Victor 47-7685 (1959)
- Jerry Lewis on his 1960 album Sings Big Songs for Little People
- Tony Randall from his 1960 album Tony Randall, Imperial LP 9090
- Mitch Miller and His Orchestra, with vocals by Anne Lloyd, Ralph Nyland and The Sandpipers, Gala Goldentone (1961)
- Noeleen Batley with The Franz Conde Orchestra on her 1961 album Rendezvous with Noeleen Bailey, Rex RL-30,010
- Sammy Turner, Bigtop Records 45-3065 (1961)
- Forrie Cairns and The Clansmen, Fontana H.380 (1962)
- Allen & Rossi (Marty Allen and Steve Rossi), Ampar MK-325 (1963)
- Gia Maione, Pr1ma P-1008 (1963)
- Little Bobby Spina, Soma 1415 (1964)
- Max Cryer & The Children, from his 1966 album Town Cryer, Zodiac ZLP 1029
- Louis Prima, featuring Gia Maione & Sam Butera, on the 1967 album The New Sounds of the Louis Prima Show
- Jaap Leben, Europhon P5034 (1967)
- Greg & Steve, on their 1975 album We All Live Together
- Happy Kyne (Frank De Vol) and the Mirth Makers, featuring Tommy Tedesco on guitar, on Fernwood 2 Night (1977)
- The Surprises, a punk rock version on the "B" side of 1979 release Jeremy Thorpe Is Innocent
- Annie de Reuver on the 1988 album Holland Amerika Story
- Sharon, Lois & Bram on their 1991 album Sing A to Z
- Joe Williams with the Robert Farnon Orchestra, on the 1994 album Here's to Life
- The Bonzo Dog Band on the 1999 album Anthropology: The Beast Within
- Cher and Gene Klosner from their 2007 album Stardust
- The Wiggles on the 2014 album Wiggle House
