= Skidamarink =

Children's sing-along song from North America

- Sheet music cover

Song

from the album The Echo
- Published: 1910
- Genre: Children's music
- Composer: Al Piantadosi
- Lyricist: Felix F. Feist

"Skidamarink" or "Skinnamarink" is a popular child's sing-along song from North America. Originally titled "Skid-dy-mer-rink-adink-aboomp" or "Skiddy-Mer-Rink-A-Doo", the initial version of the song was written by Felix F. Feist (lyrics) and Al Piantadosi (music) for the 1910 Charles Dillingham Broadway production: The Echo. Since the title is gibberish, it has had various spellings over the years. The song typically incorporates various simple hand gestures and movements, such as touching the nose and heart or making circles with the arms. Repetitive motions such as these have been used to develop motor skills and encourage physical activity in young children. Multiple organizations have declared October 8, "Skinnamarink Day".

== History ==
In Canada, the song was popularised by the children's music band Sharon, Lois & Bram, who first released it on their debut album One Elephant, Deux Elephants, and then sang it on The Elephant Show. "Skinnamarink" became their signature song, and their next television show was named Skinnamarink TV after it. A natural ice rink at the Sharon, Lois & Bram Playground in Davisville, Toronto has been named the "Skinnama-rink" in honour of the song. In 2019, a version of the Nursery rhyme was published as a children's book by Tundra Books. Lois Lilienstein heard the song when she asked her cousin's daughter if she knew any good songs, and the girl sang "Skinnamarink", which she had just heard at camp. None of the band members knew the origins of the song, and the track was attributed to "Traditional".

== In popular culture ==
- A version recorded by Guy Lombardo (entitled "Tiddley Winkie Woo") charted in Billboard magazine in May 1950.
- The 1955 UK Christmas hit "Christmas Alphabet" is based upon the melody of the chorus.
- The song began appearing on many song collections for children's shows in the 1980s. One version appeared on the Australian show Bananas in Pyjamas and Play School.
- The song is sung by D.W. Read in Arthur It's Only Rock 'n' Roll.
- Children can be heard singing the song in the background of Cat on a Hot Tin Roof.
- The song was popularized in Canada in the 1980s by Sharon, Lois and Bram.
- The song is used at the beginning of the 1985 Wee Sing video Wee Sing Together.
- On July 27, 1993, Cedarmont Kids sang the song.
- It appeared in a 2015 advertisement for Bose music systems.
- "Skidamarink" appears in an advertisement for the Chevrolet Cruze in the United States.
- Otto Brandenburg's Danish Christmas song "Søren Banjomus" is based on "Skidamarink", with accompanying "danglified" versions of the gibberish.
- The song is sung in the 2012 film Ruby Sparks.
- The name of the level SL-8 in Arknights.
- A phrase from the song is sung by Daymon Patterson in his viral video titled Five Guys Burgers and Fries Review. The video was later remixed into "Oh My Dayum", a song by The Gregory Brothers, in which "Skidamarink" also appears.
- The horror film Skinamarink was named after the song.

== Lyrics ==
=== Original 1910 version ===
1. Down on a Boola Boola Isle,

Where the mermaids chant,

Reigns big chief Crocodile

Beneath an oyster plant.

He loved a sea-nymph selfishly,

Queen of the Gay White Wave.

Each night in his shell he'd go to sea

And in tuneful scales he'd rave:

CHORUS: Skiddy-mer-rink-a-dink-a-boomp, skiddy-mer-rink-a-doo,

Means I love you.

Skiddy-mer-rink-a-dink-a-boomp, skiddy-mer-rink-a-doo,

Means I'll be true

Skiddy-mer-rink-a-dink-a-boomp, skiddy-mer-rink-a-doo,

All the time he {sang/sings} this rhyme

Skiddy-mer-rink-a-dink-a-boomp, skiddy-mer-rink-a-doo,

Means I love you.

2. But when the midnight moon was pale,

King Fish Kokomo

Came floating over with his tale

To say he loved her so;

But she was true to Crocodile,

Said "Koko-Nut, go 'way;

I know, in a very little while

You will hear my lover say:"

CHORUS

=== Current version ===
Skinnamarink a dink a dink,

Skinnamarink a doo,

I love you.

Skinnamarink a dink a dink,

Skinnamarink a doo,

I love you.

I love you in the morning.

And in the afternoon.

I love you in the evening.

And underneath the moon.

Skinnamarink a dink a dink,

Skinnamarink a doo,

I love you!
