= Keller Sisters and Lynch =

American pop group in the 1920s and 1930s

The Keller Sisters and Lynch were an American pop music group of singers of the 1920s and 1930s.

The group consisted of Annie Catherine "Nan" Keller (1900–75), Kathryne Ann "Taddy" Keller (1909–62), and Frank Lynch (1902–92). They were all siblings born with the family name Lynch.

They appeared in vaudeville, on radio, and in early sound films, but are best remembered by later generations for their phonograph records, including many made with top big bands and jazz musicians of the era, including the bands of Jean Goldkette (with Bix Beiderbecke), Vincent Lopez and Ben Bernie (Taddy Keller later married Ben Bernie's star saxophonist Jack Pettis). Frank Lynch had a very high-pitched voice for a man, and when singing with his sisters the siblings could easily be taken for an all-female trio. Also Frank's solo recordings have a tendency to sound more like a woman than a man.
