= In the Schoolyard =

Studio album by Sharon, Lois & Bram
- Released: September 1981
- Recorded: May–June 1981
- Studios: The Grange, Toronto
- Genre: Children's music
- Length: 47:40
- Labels: Elephant Records; A&M Records; Casablanca Kids Inc.
- Producer: Bill Usher

Sharon, Lois & Bram chronology
Singing 'n' Swinging (1980)	In the Schoolyard (1981)	One, Two, Three, Four, Live! (1982)

Alternative cover
- A&M Edition (1981)

Alternative cover
- Casablanca Kids Inc. Edition (2007)

In the Schoolyard is the fourth album by popular children's entertainers Sharon, Lois & Bram, originally released in 1981, featuring a central theme of songs and rhymes from the schoolyard.

== Releases ==
The album has been completely re-designed and once by Casablanca Kids Inc. However, A&M Records re-released the album and made a few minor changes to the original cover art.

The 2007 release of In the Schoolyard features all the same familiar songs, clapping rhymes, playground games and schoolyard jokes from the original 1981 release plus a bonus coloring page.

1981 (Elephant/A&M Records) (CANADA/USA) Available on Record & Cassette
2007/2008 (Casablanca Kids Inc.) (CANADA) Available on CD

== Nominations & Awards ==
Parent's Choice Award, (2007)
National Parenting Publications, Honors Award (2007) Platinum

== Track listing ==
1. "Silly Names & Crazy Gibberish"
2. "Fuzzy Wuzzy"
3. "Punchinello 47"
4. "Pufferbellies"
5. "Ah Si Mon Moine"
6. "Betty Botter"
7. "Where Is Thumbkin?"
8. "Peanut Butter & Jelly"
9. "The Skunk Said"
10. "You Can't Make A Turtle Come Out"
11. "The Duchess at Tea"
12. "Piccolomini"
13. "Stone Games"
14. "La Bamba (song)"
15. "It's A Small World"
16. "Love Somebody / A Bushel and a Peck"
17. "Un Elefante"
18. "Meeting In the Building"
19. "Mommy, What If..."
20. "Matthew, Mark, Luke & John"
21. "There Was A Little Man"
22. "The Wee Cock-Sparra'"
23. "Rattlin' Bog"
24. "Woodchuck"
25. "Down in the Valley, Two by Two"
26. "Miss Sue"
27. "Way Down Yonder in the Schoolyard"
