= Alan Mills (musician) =

Canadian folksinger, writer, and actor (c. 1913 – 1977)

- Born: Albert Miller; September 7, 1913; Lachine, Quebec, Canada
- Died: June 14, 1977 (aged 63) in Montreal, Quebec, Canada
- Occupation(s): folksinger, writer, and actor
- Known for: I Know an Old Lady Who Swallowed a Fly

Alan Mills CM (born Albert Miller; September 7, 1912 or 1913 – June 14, 1977 ) was a Canadian folksinger, writer, and actor. He was best known for popularizing Canadian folk music, and for his original song, I Know an Old Lady Who Swallowed a Fly. He appeared on several radio and television programs and in movies.

== Career ==
As a young man, Mills worked as a newspaperman. He left this work in about 1940 and took a job in radio. He hosted a show for CBC radio on which he played Canadian folk music.

Mills began singing and recording traditional music from Canada, accompanying himself on guitar. His first album, Let's Sing a Little, was released by RCA Victor. He composed the classic folk song I Know an Old Lady Who Swallowed a Fly (with lyrics by Rose Bonne) which was later recorded by Burl Ives, Peter Paul and Mary and many others. He published a book, The Alan Mills Book of Folk Songs and Ballads, in 1949. His recordings of authentic traditional music were reviewed by Oscar Brand in the Saturday Review of Music, and included in a number of folk music compilation albums.

Mills was signed to take part in tour of the United States in 1960, and that year performed at the Newport Folk Festival.

He was made a Member of the Order of Canada in 1974 for his contributions to Canadian folklore. Mills also released several albums on Folkways Records of Canadian and French folk songs.

== Discography ==
Release date	Album title	Label
1975	Soirée Québecoise du temps des fêtes	Folkways Records
1972	14 Numbers, Letters, & Animal Songs (with Bram Morrison)	Folkways Records
1962	Jewish Folk Songs (with Raasche)	Folkways Records
1961	Alan Mills and Jean Carignan: Songs, Fiddle Tunes and a Folk-Tale from Canada	Folkways Records
1961	Chantons en Francais, Vol. 2	Folkways Records
1961	Chantons en Francais, Vol. 1	Folkways Records
1960	Canada's Story in Song	Folkways Records
1959	Songs of the Maritimes: Lumberman Songs and Songs of the Sea	Folkways Records
1958	We'll Rant and We'll Roar: Songs of Newfoundland	Folkways Records
1957	French Folk Songs for Children in English	Folkways Records
1957	Christmas Songs from Many Lands	Folkways Records
1957	Songs of the Sea: Sung by Alan Mills and the Four Shipmates	Folkways Records
1956	Animals, Vol. 1	Folkways Records
1956	Chansons d'Acadie	Folkways Records
1956	More Animals, Vol. 2	Folkways Records
1956	O' Canada: A History in Song	Folkways Records
1955	Songs of French Canada (with Hélène Baillargeon)	Folkways Records
1954	More Songs to Grow On	Folkways Records
1953	Folk Songs of Newfoundland	Folkways Records
1953	French Folk Songs for Children	Folkways Records
1952	Folk Songs of French Canada	Folkways Records

n.d. "Chansons a Boire' [Venus VL 301]
