= Singing 'n' Swinging =

Singing 'n Swinging

Studio album by Sharon, Lois & Bram
- Released: 1980
- Genre: Children's music
- Length: 39:48
- Labels: Elephant Records; A&M Records; Drive Entertainment

Sharon, Lois & Bram chronology
Smorgasbord (1979)	Singing 'n Swinging (1980)	In the Schoolyard (1981)

Alternative cover
- 1996 re-release cover

Singing n Swinging is the third album by popular children's entertainers Sharon, Lois & Bram, originally released in 1980.

== Releases ==
The album has been re-designed and re-released once throughout the trio's career. Originally the album was titled "Singing 'n Swinging'", but for the re-release the name was changed to "Singing & Swinging".

1980 (Elephant Records/A&M Records) "Singing 'n Swinging"
1996 (Drive Entertainment) "Singing & Swinging"

== Nominations & Awards ==
- 2 Juno Awards, Best Children's Album (1980)

Platinum

== Track listing ==
1. "Ticka Tacka Telephone"
2. "Charlie Over the Ocean"
3. "All Hid"
4. "The Smile on the Crocodile"
5. "Doctor Knickerbocker"
6. "Yes Indeed"
7. "The Ants Go Marching"
8. "The Very Best Band"
9. "Poor Howard"
10. "Jamais On N'a Vu"
11. "The Muffin Man"
12. "I Know A Little Pussy"
13. "The Cat Came Back"
14. "Eeny Meeny My"
15. "Bassez Down"
16. "Monte Sur Un Elephante"
17. "Aba Daba Honeymoon"
18. "Pinyebo"
19. "Dance To Your Daddy Medley"
20. "Odda Papah Da Pollah"
21. "Waddaly Atcha"
22. "Once I Saw Three Goats"
23. "I Am Slowly Going Crazy"
24. "You Made Me A Pallet on the Floor"
25. "Precious Friends / Skinnamarink"
