= Smorgasbord (album) =

Studio album by Sharon, Lois & Bram
- Released: 1979
- Genres: Children's music, folk songs
- Length: 45:10
- Labels: Elephant Records; A&M Records; Casablanca Kids Inc.
- Producer: Bill Usher

Sharon, Lois & Bram chronology
One Elephant, Deux Éléphants (1978)	Smorgasbord (1979)	Singing 'n' Swinging (1980)

Alternative cover
- A&M Edition (1990)

Alternative cover
- Casablanca Kids Edition (2006)

Smorgasbord is the second album by Torontonian kids' folk trio, Sharon, Lois & Bram, originally released in 1979.

== Releases ==
When the album was released in the USA under A&M Records, the artwork on the front cover was changed. From 1979 to 2006, Smorgasbord remained available only on cassette and LP Record. In 2006, Casablanca Kids re-released the album under the same name but with a more modern, kid-friendly cover.

1979 (Elephant Records) "Smorgasbord" (CANADA)
1990 (A&M Records/Elephant Records) "Smorgasbord" (USA)
2006 (Casablanca Kids Inc.) "Smorgasbord" (CANADA)

== Nominations & Awards ==
Juno Award, Best Children's Album (1980)
National Parenting Publications, Gold Award (2006)
Outstanding Products Call, iParenting Media Award (2006)
Our Choice Award (2007)
Double Platinum

== Touring & Concerts ==
Sharon, Lois & Bram promoted this album with a series of five concerts at Young People's Theater in Toronto from September 28 through September 30, 1979. After the official release of the album, the trio embarked on their first national tour across Canada, touching base across all areas of Ontario as well as parts of the western Canadian coast. The tour ended at Seneca College in North York where kids were bussed in from all areas of Ontario to see the grand finale performance.

== Track listing ==
1. "Peanut Butter"
2. "Head 'n Shoulders, Baby"
3. "Hold 'em Joe"
4. "Three Little Monkeys"
5. "Did You Feed My Cow?"
6. "Long-Legged Sailor"
7. "Newfoundland Jig Medley"
8. "John Jacob Jingleheimer Schmidt"
9. "Jennie Jenkins"
10. "A You're Adorable"
11. "Hobo's Lullaby"
12. "Hey Dum Diddeley Dum"
13. "Smorgasbord"
14. "Sur le pont d'Avignon"
15. "Chirri Bim"
16. "Dan, Dan the Dirty Old Man"
17. "Father Papered the Parlor"
18. "My Dog Rags"
19. "Dirty Old Bill"
20. "Cheerio"
21. "Che Che Koolay"
22. "Mango Walk"
23. "Riding Along (Singing A Cowboy Song)"
24. "Michael Finnegan"
25. "Little Sally Saucer"
26. "Train Is A-Coming"
