= Candles, Snow & Mistletoe =

Studio album by Sharon, Lois & Bram
- Released: 1993
- Recorded: Group IV Recording, Los Angeles, California
- Genre: Children's music
- Length: 51:00
- Labels: Elephant Records; Drive Entertainment; Casablanca Kids Inc.
- Producer: Glen Roven

Sharon, Lois & Bram chronology
| Songs in the Key of Kids (1993) | Candles, Snow & Mistletoe (1993) | Candles Long Ago (1993) |

Candles, Snow & Mistletoe is the 13th album by popular children's entertainers Sharon, Lois & Bram, originally released in 1993. This holiday album is one of Sharon, Lois & Bram's biggest productions and recordings they worked on during their career. The album is produced by Glen Roven, an Emmy-Award winning producer who has worked with Liza Minnelli. Lyrics were written by Mark Saltzman who also worked with Sesame Street. This album, unlike previous Sharon, Lois & Bram albums, has a Broadway sound to the album. It featured a complete orchestra and was recorded using the same microphones as The Manhattan Transfer.

Not only was Candles, Snow & Mistletoe a musical recording, but it was also a CBC Television Special, later released onto video, as well as a Broadway Show. This was Sharon, Lois & Bram's first holiday-themed album that was recorded for the, then newly founded, Drive Entertainment label. The album featured all the lyrics to the songs as well a recipe from each member of the trio. The album became the fastest selling album in their career with initial shipments in excess of 100,000 units.

== Releases ==
The original release was in 1993 under Elephant Records in Canada, and in 1995 under Drive Entertainment in the United States. The cover features cartoonized versions of the trio and their mascot, elephant out in the snow. In 2000, Casablanca Kids Inc. picked up the publishing rights and it was available under their label, but with the same artwork as the 1993 release. In May 2009, Casablanca Kids Inc. redesigned the cover and renamed the album to 'Family Christmas' because of cataloging issues in libraries and the old name caused confusion when customers asked for the particular album. The 2009 release includes the same songs as the earlier release.

- 1993 (Elephant Records) Cassette/CD
- 1995 (Drive Entertainment) Cassette/CD
- 2000/2001/2008/2009 (Casablanca Kids Inc.) CD

== Home video / television special ==
The album was then televised on CBC as a Christmas Special in 1993 and was later released on video under the same name in 1994. This 50-minute home video, produced by Eryk Casemiro for Broadway Video, and directed by Michael McNamara, features "an original musical fantasy that combines familiar warmth, wit, and vocal magic of stars Sharon, Lois & Bram with the hijinks of their adorable pal, Elephant. [The film] is chock-full of unforgettable new songs and familiar Christmas classics produced by Emmy Award-Winning composer, Glen Roven. By turns heartwarming and hilarious, the story unfolds as Sharon, Lois & Bram take a most unusual train trip home for the holidays. Joined by an eccentric assortment of fellow passengers, the trio take the ride of their lives and rediscover the true meaning of the holiday season." The video was released on Lorne Michaels' Broadway Video. The television special on CBC rated 1.2 million Canadian households in December 1993 (800,000 was considered a hit success).

Cast included: Paul Brown also seen in Anne of Green Gables as Mr. Phillips, Maria Vacratsis, Dan Redican, Bernard Behrens

== Broadway show ==
Not only was Candles, Snow & Mistletoe a video, but it was also a week-long, 10-performance show on Broadway at the Palace Theater in New York City, produced by Broadway producer Liz McCann and Eryk Casemiro. The show was previewed at the O'Keefe Centre, now called Meridian Hall, in Toronto in November 1993 before it began its limited run at the Palace Theater in New York. The show had a similar plot to that of the home video, but varied slightly. In the live show, Santa Claus loses his ho-ho-ho and its up to Sharon, Lois & Bram and their pachyderm pal, Elephant, to embark upon a musical journey to the North Pole and show Santa the true spirit of the holiday season. It openened on December 26, 1993 and ran until December 30, 1993. Despite initial sluggish sales, the show was well received by the audiences that attended.

== "All the Holiday Fun You Can Sing!" tour ==
After Candles, Snow & Mistletoe finished its stint on Broadway; Sharon, Lois & Bram continued to offer it as a concert show titled "All the Holiday Fun You Can Sing!" that ran for several years. In 1994, the show sold over 19,000 tickets spread out over 8 concerts at the O'Keefe Center in Toronto. The hour-long concert featured an orchestra and somewhat of a storyline about finding the true spirit of the holidays. Each concert also featured some of the Sharon, Lois & Bram classics.

Sweatshirts featuring the same image as the musical album were available for purchase at the holiday concerts and online through their, then, online store.

== Nominations and awards ==
Best Children's Album (1993)
Our Choice Award, Canadian Children's Book Centre(1993)
Juno Nomination, Best Children's Album (1993)
Gemini Nomination, Best Children's Program or Series (1995)
Gold

== Album track listing ==
1. "We Need a Little Christmas"
2. "Rudolph the Red-Nosed Reindeer"
3. "The Twelve Days of Christmas"
4. "Candles Long Ago"
5. "Mrs. Fogarty's Christmas Cake"
6. "Have Yourself a Merry Little Christmas"
7. "Don't Bring An Elephant (To A Family Meal)"
8. "Bells Medley: Silver Bells, Jingle Bells, Ring them Bells"
9. "A Winter Sweet"
10. ""Merry Hula/Christmas Island"
11. "With Bells On"
12. "Christmas Is A-Comin'"
13. "There Was A Pig Went Out to Dig"
14. "I'm A Little Latke"
15. "Dreydl, Dreydl"
16. "Oy Chanukah"
17. "Cool Yule"
18. "We Wish You A Merry Christmas"

== Broadway program ==
1. "We Need a Little Christmas"
2. "Christmas Is A-Comin'"
3. "Bells Medley: Silver Bells, Jingle Bells, Ring Them Bells"
4. "Mrs. Fogarty's Christmas Cake"
5. "I'm A Little Latke"
6. "Dreydl, Dreydl"
7. "Oy Chanukah"
8. "Merry Hula/Christmas Island"
9. "A Winter Sweet"
10. "With Bells On"
11. "Cool Yule"
12. "Have Yourself a Merry Little Christmas"
13. "Great Big Hits Medley"
14. "Candles Long Ago"
15. "Rudolph the Red-Nosed Reindeer"
16. "We Wish You A Merry Christmas"
17. "Santa Claus is Coming to Town"
18. "Deck the Halls"
19. "Skinnamarink"
