= Sing A to Z =

Studio album by Sharon, Lois & Bram
- Released: 1990
- Genre: Children's music
- Length: 44:00
- Labels: Elephant Records; A&M Records; Drive Entertainment; Casablanca Kids Inc.

Sharon, Lois & Bram chronology
Car Tunes (1989/1990)	Sing A to Z (1990)	Kidbits (1992)

Sing A to Z is the tenth album by children's entertainers Sharon, Lois & Bram. It was originally released in 1990.

== Releases ==
The original release was in 1990 under Elephant Records in Canada, and under A&M Records in the United States. It featured the trio in the middle with an alphabet border. In 1994, Drive Entertainment re-packaged the album after it won the Parent's Choice Award and Elephant was added to the front cover. In 2004, Casablanca Kids Inc. released the album but reverted to the original cover design.

1990 (Elephant Records/A&M Records) Cassette/CD/Video
1994 (Drive Entertainment) Cassette/CD/Video
2004/2005/2008 (Casablanca Kids Inc.) CD/DVD

== Home Video & DVD ==
To promote the album, Sharon, Lois & Bram went on tour across Canada and the United States. A 50-minute video was made featuring Sharon, Lois & Bram on stage with their Sing A to Z Tour. It was re-packaged and re-designed for the Drive Entertainment release as well.

When Casablanca Kids Inc. re-released the album, they also took the 50-minute video and made it into a DVD titled "Sharon, Lois & Bram's ABCs". This was the first DVD in the Sharon, Lois & Bram collection. It featured photo galleries of the trio as well as each individual member. It also included bonus songs and a clip of the opening to their second TV series "Skinnamarink TV". It was released in both the United States and Canada. The Canadian edition featured Sharon near the letter "A", Bram near "B", and Lois near "C", it also titled "Sharon, Lois & Bram ABC's". The American edition featured Lois near "B" and Bram near "C", and the title is slightly different: "Sharon, Lois & Bram: ABC". Also, the color of the alphabet letters varies between the two editions.

In addition, a Songbook titled "Sharon, Lois & Bram Sing A to Z" was published. Illustrated by Kim LaFave, it is full of colorful sketches as well as words and music to many of the songs heard on the album.

== Nominations & Awards ==
Parent's Choice Award, Classic Audio (1993)
Parent's Choice GOLD Award, Best Children's Recording (1991)
Juno Nomination, Best Children's Album (1991)
Gold

== Track listing ==
1. "Alphabet Medley"
2. "Come Follow the Band"
3. "Chicken Medley"
4. "The Cubanola Glide"
5. "Little Sir Echo"
6. "Gatgoon"
7. "Five Little Fishies"
8. "Les Petits Poissons"
9. "Grandpa's Farm"
10. "Shoe a Little Horse"
11. "Caballito Blanco"
12. "When the Iceworms Nest Again"
13. "J My Name Is Jenny"
14. "Jellyman Kelly"
15. "Kiddy Kum Kimo"
16. "Love Poem"
17. "Baby Face (song)"
18. "Mairzy Doats"
19. "N My Name Is Natasha"
20. "Name Game"
21. "Owl Lullaby"
22. "Susannah's a Funny Old Man"
23. "Somebody Come & Play"
24. "Hush, Little Baby"
25. "rr con rr"
26. "Riding in the Buggy / Tideo"
27. "Spelling Medley"
28. "Mister Sun"
29. "On the Sunny Side of the Street"
30. "Tzena, Tzena"
31. "Up in the Air, Junior Birdsmen"
32. "Down in the Valley"
33. "New World Coming"
34. "XYZinnamarink"
