= Skinnamarink TV =

- Genre: Sketch comedy; Children's television
- Created by: Richard Mortimer; Lynn Harvey
- Starring: Sharon, Lois & Bram; Tikka Sherman; Dwayne Adams
- Opening theme: Skinnamarink TV Theme
- Ending theme: Skinnamarink
- Countries of origin: United States; Canada
- Original language: English
- No. of seasons: 2
- No. of episodes: 52

Production
- Running time: 30 minutes

Original release
- Network: CBC (Canada); TLC (U.S.)
- Release: October 24, 1997 – March 12, 1999

Related
- The Elephant Show

Skinnamarink TV is a children's sketch comedy television program created by Richard Mortimer and starring Sharon, Lois & Bram. The series originally aired on CBC Television in Canada, and in the United States on The Learning Channel's programming block Ready Set Learn!. It was created by Lynn Harvey and Richard Mortimer (Twist Productions) for Skinnamarink Entertainment in association with Craftsman & Scribe's Creative Workshop, The Learning Channel, and the Canadian Broadcasting Corporation (CBC).

== Plot ==
It starred Sharon, Lois & Bram and two new characters C.C. CopyCat, a sarcastic blue feline played by Dwayne Adams, and Ella Acapella, a young female elephant, played by Tikka Sherman.

The show mocked the life of an actual television station. It included many skits and musical bits with Sharon, Lois & Bram acting as many different characters. Along with Ella Acapella and C.C. CopyCat, Sharon, Lois & Bram operate a fictional TV station called Skinnamarink TV. The name comes from the song "Skidamarink" which closed the trio's original program, The Elephant Show.

The wraparounds involved the Big Red Button which did various things to the studio and the group.

== Segments ==
- 2 of a Kind – A sitcom about two conjoined twins named Millie and Tillie (Sharon and Lois).
- A Nosey Moment with Nosey Parker – Similar to Nosey's Park, in some episodes of Season 2, a segment would be interrupted by Nosey Parker entering the scene with her cleaning cart and giving advice to someone on a certain subject.
- Construction Site – A how-to craft show where construction worker Shameless O'Tool (Bram) shows kids how to make crafts.
- Cookie's Diner – A bakery show where Cookie LaFrano (Lois), the diner's owner, sings songs and makes food for her customers.
- Crazy Jake's Joke Emporium – About a crazy jokester named Crazy Jake (Bram) who tells jokes to kids and Ella hiding in the doors of a wall wondering if they knew it. This segment is considered to be a commercial rather than a show and is almost similar to the "joke wall" of Rowan & Martin's Laugh-In.
- Creepytime – Sharon, Lois, and Bram play siblings who get scared by things that go bump in the night.
- Ellavision – A show hosted by Ella during Season 2 where kids try to guess a secret word that would open up the Ellavision rock. C.C. CopyCat and his ventriloquist dummy CopyKitty are her co-hosts.
- Finger Play – A song or story is sung or told by either Sharon, Lois, or Bram with their fingers. This was used during Season 2.
- Go-Go-Go – A workout show featuring Patti Pert (Sharon) and kids doing exercises through songs. Lois and Bram also make appearances along with Ella and C.C. CopyCat.
- Good News – A news program where tongue-tied news anchor Lianna Brianna Smith (Sharon) interviews certain people.
- Good Sports – Similar to Good News, but it focuses more on sports with sports reporter Kenny G. Whiz (Lois).
- Good Weather – Similar to Good News and Good Sports, but it focuses more on weather with weatherman Percy P. Tation (Bram).
- Hmmm – A science show about a scientist Professor Hmmm (Bram) and his assistant (Ella). In Season 2, Professor Hmmm's two sisters Professor Ohhh (Sharon) and Professor Ahhh (Lois) would sometimes help him with his experiments.
- Inspector Gumshoe – About a detective named Inspector Gumshoe (Bram) and his sidekick Ella Mentary (Ella).
- The Late Late Show – A show about old movies. Sharon, Lois, Bram, C.C., and Ella play certain characters for the movie.
- Lost from Space – A parody of the television series Lost in Space.
- Nosey's Park – Nosey Parker (Lois) randomly walks into a park and gives advice to someone on a certain subject. This was used during Season 1.
- Really Big Shoo – Sharon, Lois, and Bram perform a musical number on a stage.
- Rhyme Time – In this segment, Bram plays someone numerous, and rhymes something.
- Silly Sonata – A concert show where C.C. CopyCat, Sharon, Lois and Bram perform silly renditions of different orchestra songs.
- Story Time – An elderly woman named Grandma Griselda (Sharon) tells stories to the viewers from a huge, dusty storybook on her shelf, but she tells stories the way kids have never heard before.
- Soap Opera – A musical soap opera.
- Take It from Me – An advice show where the Singing Sage, a fortune teller (Sharon) tries to solve people's problems through song.
- The Farm Report – Henny Hayseed (aka Cousin Henny) (Lois) hosts a talk show on a farm accompanied by three kids. She has special guests that are animals appear on her show. After Henny talks with the special guest, she performs a song related to the guest. In some episodes, Henny's cousins Penny (Sharon) and Lenny (Bram) would come to the farm for a visit.
- What to Wear – A fashion show where fashion expert Chi Chi Darling (Lois) advises kids what to wear in all circumstances.
- What Zat? – A game show where contestants can guess something, where C.C. CopyCat is the host, Ella is the hostess, and Sharon, Lois, and Bram as characters from other sketches are the contestants.
- Window Dressing – Sharon, Lois, and Bram, are dressed as models in different clothes inside the window of a clothing store. They are frozen when the store manager (Ella) is around, but when she is absent, they come to life and sing a song.

== Episodes ==
=== Season 1 (1997–98) ===
No.	Title	Original release date
1	"Giving"	October 24, 1997
Ella, C.C. CopyCat, Sharon, Lois, and Bram spend the day trying to figure out who a mysterious gift is for.
2	"Cooperation"	October 31, 1997
When Ella pushes the Big Red Button all by herself, Sharon, Lois, and Bram and the gang show her the right way to cooperate.
3	"Sounds"	November 7, 1997
C.C. CopyCat copies everything everyone says, until he pushed the Big Red Button.
4	"Lost & Found"	November 14, 1997
Ella, C.C. CopyCat, Sharon, Lois, and Bram keep losing their possessions. They start to wonder when they find them all at C.C. CopyCat's Lost & Found.
5	"Clean"	November 21, 1997
C.C. CopyCat shows the gang his C.C. patented dust sucker, and things start to get really crazy!
6	"Fast & Slow"	November 28, 1997
The gang arrives to Master Control late and the Big Red Button makes things go either really fast, or very slow!
7	"Sleep"	December 5, 1997
Lois is tired, so Ella, C.C. CopyCat, Sharon, and Bram stay as quiet as they can be.
8	"Smell"	December 12, 1997
Ella doesn't know what to do when the Big Red Button takes her smell sense away from her. C.C. CopyCat, Sharon, Lois, and Bram try their best to help.
9	"Courage"	December 19, 1997
Sharon, Lois, and Bram try to get Ella and C.C. Copycat to face their fears.
10	"Growing"	December 26, 1997
When Ella pushes the Big Red Button, Sharon, Lois, and Bram turn into little babies!
11	"Friendship"	January 2, 1998
Ella is jealous when everyone is having more fun playing with a new puppy.
12	"Nonsense"	January 9, 1998
At Master Control it's Official Nonsense Day, but when C.C. CopyCat becomes more strict, Official Nonsense Day can't last for long.
13	"Healthy Body"	January 16, 1998
There's a dirt alert at Master Control, and C.C. CopyCat is the dirty one.
14	"Rhythm"	January 23, 1998
After a push of the Big Red Button, a runaway rhythm is lurking at Skinnamarink TV.
15	"Moods"	January 30, 1998
Ella, C.C. CopyCat, Sharon, Lois, and Bram are all in a happy mood until the Big Red Button is pushed.
16	"Chickens!"	February 6, 1998
When the Big Red Button is pushed, C.C. CopyCat becomes a mother hen!
17	"Hot & Cold"	February 13, 1998
When the group pushes the Big Red Button, Master Control can't seem to stay at the correct temperature.
18	"Places"	February 20, 1998
Ella is lost in many different places including space and even the jungle.
19	"Pretending"	February 27, 1998
A truth detector arrives at Master Control.
20	"Fun"	March 6, 1998
It is Official Fun Day at the station!
21	"Love"	March 13, 1998
With a push of the Big Red Button, C.C. CopyCat becomes in love with everything.
22	"Numbers"	March 20, 1998
Ella tries to figure out what her favorite number is.
23	"Colors & Shapes"	March 27, 1998
When Ella, C.C. CopyCat, Sharon, Lois, and Bram push the Big Red Button, everything turns into different colors and shapes.
24	"Big & Small"	April 3, 1998
When the gang pushes the Big Red Button Ella becomes microscopic!
25	"Body Check"	April 10, 1998
With a push of the Big Red Button, C.C. CopyCat magically has an elephant's trunk instead of a nose.
26	"Communication"	April 17, 1998
C.C. CopyCat loses his voice when Sharon, Lois, and Bram push the Big Red Button.

=== Season 2 (1998–99) ===
No.	Title	Original release date
27	"Accepting Differences"	September 18, 1998
When everything at the station changes, Ella, C.C. CopyCat, Sharon, Lois, and Bram learn to accept the changes and differences at Master Control.
28	"Trains, Boats, Planes & Feet"	September 25, 1998
C.C. CopyCat's transportation machine is more than the group can handle!
29	"Jobs, Jobs, Jobs"	October 2, 1998
When Ella wishes she could take Sharon, Lois, and Bram's job for as boss, she becomes boss for a day. She realizes that it is not all that it is cracked up to be!
30	"Thoughts for Food"	October 9, 1998
When C.C. CopyCat pushes the Big Red Button, he realizes he shouldn't have when tons of popcorn comes flying out at the station.
31	"City vs. Country"	October 16, 1998
Ella, Sharon, Lois, and Bram get to meet C.C. CopyCat's cousin, C.C. CountryCat when he comes in from the country.
32	"The Name Game"	October 23, 1998
When the Big Red Button is pushed, nobody knows anyone else's name.
33	"Imagination"	October 30, 1998
Thought bubbles appear when Ella, C.C. CopyCat, Sharon, Lois, and Bram think of what they like, or what they want.
34	"How Things Work"	November 6, 1998
Ella, C.C. CopyCat, Sharon, Lois, and Bram try to fix the Big Red Button when it breaks down.
35	"Families"	November 13, 1998
Ella learns that she does have a family.
36	"In & Outdoors"	November 20, 1998
When the gang pushes the Big Red Button, it becomes outdoors, indoors!
37	"Dancing Feet"	November 27, 1998
Ella, C.C. CopyCat, Sharon, Lois, and Bram can't stop dancing when everyone pushes the Big Red Button.
38	"Feel Good About Yourself"	December 4, 1998
Ella has an imaginary "Happy Hat".
39	"Birds & Bees"	December 11, 1998
When the Big Red Button is pushed, Ella becomes a flower and C.C. CopyCat becomes a bee.
40	"Up & Down"	December 18, 1998
When Ella, C.C. CopyCat, Sharon, Lois, and Bram push the Big Red Button, Master Control begins to move up and down.
41	"Seasons"	December 25, 1998
C.C. CopyCat's patented Dial-A-Season works too well and creates total chaos at Skinnamarink TV.
42	"Time Travelers"	January 1, 1999
When the Big Red Button is pushed, the big question is "What Time is It?".
43	"Magic"	January 8, 1999
Magic dust causes Ella to sneeze and make Sharon, Lois, and Bram disappear.
44	"Dressing Up"	January 15, 1999
It's Dress Up Day at Skinnamarink TV and Ella, C.C. CopyCat, Sharon, Lois, and Bram dress up in funny costumes for the occasion.
45	"Melody Makers"	January 22, 1999
The C.C. patented Music Maker causes Sharon, Lois, and Bram to sing instead of speak.
46	"Morning & Night"	January 29, 1999
When Ella, C.C. CopyCat, Sharon, Lois, and Bram push the Big Red Button, everyone wonders if its morning or night at Master Control.
47	"Sickness & Health"	February 5, 1999
When Ella becomes a doctor, she doesn't seem to be too great at her new job.
48	"Over & Under"	February 12, 1999
Ella, C.C. CopyCat, Sharon, Lois, and Bram go on a treasure hunt!
49	"Rhyme"	February 19, 1999
When the gang hits the Big Red Button they start talking in rhyme all of the time.
50	"Neighborhood"	February 26, 1999
Ella, C.C. CopyCat, Sharon, Lois, and Bram talk about their own neighborhood.
51	"Everybody Happy?"	March 5, 1999
Is everybody happy at Skinnamarink TV?
52	"Good Times & Bad"	March 12, 1999
Two different photo albums stir mixed feelings between Ella, C.C. CopyCat, Sharon, Lois, and Bram. A look back at the happy times they shared together brings them closer than before.

== Album ==
The trio's 1998 album, Skinnamarink TV won a Juno Award in 2000. The album featured songs from the television show. The song I Have A Little Tricycle which appeared on the album was added to the 2000 Juno Collection 2-CD Set.
