= The Elephant Show =

Canadian television show airing from 1984 to 1989

- Title card for seasons 3-5
- Also known as: Sharon, Lois & Bram's Elephant Show
- Starring: Sharon, Lois & Bram; Paula Gallivan; Eric Nagler
- Opening theme: "One Elephant Went Out to Play"
- Ending theme: "Skinnamarink"
- Country of origin: Canada
- Original language: English
- No. of seasons: 5
- No. of episodes: 65 (list of episodes)

Production
- Production locations: Toronto, Ontario
- Running time: 30 minutes
- Production companies: Cambium Film & Video Productions, Ltd.

Original release
- Network: CBC
- Release: October 8, 1984 – February 26, 1989

Related
- Skinnamarink TV

The Elephant Show (from the second season onward, Sharon, Lois & Bram's Elephant Show) is a Canadian musical preschool television series. It premiered on CBC on October 8, 1984, and ended on February 26, 1989, after 65 episodes over five seasons in five years.

== Summary ==
The Elephant Show features the adventures of a three-piece, children's music band Sharon, Lois & Bram with their non-human friend Elephant (Paula Gallivan in an elephant costume). Elephant doesn't speak, but is voiced by a tuba (played by Scott Irvine), which conveys thoughts and mood by its pitch and inflection. The four are usually accompanied by a group of children and a sidekick, family entertainer Eric Nagler.

Every week, Sharon, Lois & Bram, along with Eric Nagler, are joined by the curious and fun-loving antics of their pachyderm friend Elephant and such guest artists as Toller Cranston, Louis Del Grande, Jayne Eastwood, Murray McLauchlan, Chuck Mangione, Andrea Martin, Mendelson Joe and Jan Rubeš.

Almost every episode contains a concert segment, featuring Sharon, Lois & Bram, Eric and the Mammoth Band. They sing songs and help children with their issues (including arguments, fear and the failure of plans). In most episodes, the group travels to a different location (such as school, museum or zoo). They occasionally stay home and have an adventure in their yard (such as building a tree fort or encountering a grumpy neighbour). The show occasionally includes a social lesson (such as a pro-UNICEF discussion). Sharon, Lois and Bram appeared in advertisements during the show's original run, encouraging parents to vaccinate their children against polio, mumps and rubella. Each episode concludes with the song "Skinnamarink", which was often performed twice.

The show boasted top ratings in Canada and had consistently been rated one of the top three programs on Nickelodeon in the United States. In 1993, a panel of experts at TV Guide rated The Elephant Show the #2 program for preschoolers, beating PBS' Sesame Street (#5) and Barney & Friends (#9). In the years following the final season, the show remained on Nickelodeon until it aired for the last time on October 21, 1994. By that time, The Elephant Show had aired 65 episodes in five seasons (plus two specials, Live in Your Living Room and Back by Popular Demand, which compiled tour performances from the show with some new narration) and had been viewed in North America, reaching over 100 million viewers. After the series ended, Eric Nagler starred in his own series, Eric's World, produced by The Elephant Show's producer, Cambium Productions. Reruns of the series aired throughout the 1990s on Canadian networks such as TVOntario, Knowledge Network, YTV, and Access.

== Credits ==
- Directed by: George Bloomfield, Michael McNarama
- Produced by: Arnie Zipursky, Bruce Glawson
- Associate producer & production manager: Charles Zamaria
- Concert directed by: Stan Swan
- Music directors: Joe Hampson, Ray Parker, Paul Mills
- Choreographers: Don Calderwood, Paula Gallivan
- Art director: Susan Longmire
- Property masters: Ray Lorenz
- Set dresser: Ane Christensen
- On-line editor: Bob Doughty
- 1st camera: Simon Darylmple
- Lighting director: Roger Bate
- Best boy: Thomas Bate
- Key grips: Cynthia Darlow
- Music production assistant: Randi Hampson
- Animation: Trickett Productions, Inc.
- Multi-track remote: Comfort Sound

== Home video ==
The show has never been released on DVD in its original form as of yet, although there is a compilation video (along with Treetown) titled Nursery Rhymes and Bedtime Songs, which was also released as part of the Kids Learn to 6 Pack DVD under the name Stories, Rhymes and Lullabies.
