= Sharon, Lois & Bram =

Canadian children's music group

- Sharon, Lois & Bram with Elephant in 1994

Background information
- Origin: Toronto, Ontario, Canada
- Genre: Children's music
- Instruments: Sharon: vocals, guitar, piano, tambourine Lois: piano, autoharp, vocals Bram: guitar, banjo, vocals
- Years active: 1978–present
- Labels: Elephant, A&M, Drive Entertainment, Skinnamarink Entertainment, Casablanca Kids Inc., Red Brick Songs.
- Members: Sharon Hampson; Randi Hampson
- Past members: Lois Lilienstein; Bramwell "Bram" Morrison
- Website: www.sharonloisandbram.com

Sharon Hampson
- Born: Sharon Trostin; March 31, 1943 (age 83); Toronto, Ontario, Canada

Lois Lilienstein
- Born: Lois Ada Goldberg; July 10, 1936; Chicago, Illinois, U.S.
- Died: April 22, 2015 (aged 78); Toronto, Ontario, Canada

Bramwell "Bram" Morrison
- Born: December 18, 1940 (age 85); Toronto, Ontario, Canada

Sharon, Lois & Bram (also known as Sharon, Bram & Friends, Sharon & Bram or Sharon & Randi) are a Canadian children's music group founded in Toronto, Ontario, in 1978. The group's original lineup consisted of Sharon (née Trostin) Hampson, Lois Ada (née Goldberg) Lilienstein, and Bramwell "Bram" Morrison.

== Group formation ==
Sharon Hampson, Lois Lilienstein, and Bram Morrison began their singing careers as individuals and met while performing for the "Mariposa in the Schools" program, a project of the Mariposa Folk Festival. The three performers quickly discovered that they shared a common philosophy about creating quality music for people of all ages.

Hampson studied piano, cello, and guitar as a child and began publicly performing as a folk singer in cafes at 17. Performing as a duo with Michel Choquette, in 1964 the pair released an album with songs in French and English entitled Songs for Children and Other People. She married Joe Hampson of the folk band The Travellers. Lilienstein's father was a piano player, and she began performing at age six. She trained in classical and jazz piano and earned her degree in music literature and piano from the University of Michigan. Morrison attended the University of Toronto, and for four years toured North America backing the folk singer Alan Mills, playing guitar on two of his albums. He taught music in Toronto Public Schools for seven years.

In 1978, with $22,000 borrowed from family and friends, they recorded their first album One Elephant, Deux Éléphants, released by Elephant Records and distributed by A&M. The folk-style album, with its eclectic musical mix, became one of the fastest-selling children's albums ever produced in Canada.

Producer Bill Usher contributed to their singing style. Usher was looking for a more energetic twist to children's music and a shift away from the previous traditional folk style. He sought out songs that drew upon various musical styles such as rock'n roll, Broadway, and calypso. Sharon, Lois & Bram's appeal crossed a variety of demographics.

== Career ==
During the 1980s, the trio starred in The Elephant Show on CBC. The series was later aired in reruns on the U.S. cable network Nickelodeon, through 1996. Each 30-minute installment featured episode-length storylines, songs, and sketches featuring the trio alongside a human-sized elephant puppet and children's entertainer, Eric Nagler. Special guests, which included Louis Del Grande, Jayne Eastwood, Andrea Martin, Kate and Anna McGarrigle, Murray McLauchlan, Ann Mortifee, Fred Penner, Jan Rubeš, Sneezy Waters, The Nylons, The Shuffle Demons, and many more, also appeared on each 30-minute episode. A second series, titled Skinnamarink TV, featured a different format and two new puppet characters. The series ran for 52 episodes on the CBC in Canada and The Learning Channel in the United States from 1997 to 1999.

In 1995, the trio was asked by a collective of Western Canada planetariums to produce a "Laser Sharon, Lois & Bram" multi-media presentation, so that children could be introduced at an early age to the Solar System, by way of education through entertainment. Make A Wish with Sharon, Lois & Bram premiered in June 1995 for extended runs in Vancouver's H. R. MacMillan Space Centre and Toronto's McLaughlin Planetarium. Also, in 1995, the traditional song, "Old John Braddelum", from their album, One Elephant, Deux Éléphants (1978), appeared in the feature-film Billy Madison, starring Adam Sandler.

In 1996, Sharon, Lois & Bram were appointed as spokespersons for UNICEF Canada's 50th Anniversary Year Celebration.

In 2000, following her husband's death, Lilienstein retired from touring with the group, which from that point on often performed as Sharon, Bram & Friends, with "friends" referring to life-size animal puppets. Lilienstein continued to play benefit shows and record with the group. The duo continued to tour and are currently represented by Jeff Andrusyk at JMA Talent.

In 2005, Bram announced that he had been found to have a benign tumor which was causing deafness in one ear. He underwent an experimental procedure to prevent further hearing loss.

On May 4, 2008, Sharon, Lois & Bram reunited onstage at the Toronto Jewish Film Festival, for a rare performance featuring all three singers and a viewing of 25 Years of Skinnamarink.

On May 10, 2014, the "Sharon, Lois & Bram Playground" was dedicated at June Rowlands Park in midtown Toronto. The playground naming was originally proposed by Toronto Councillor Josh Matlow. The ceremony was attended by roughly 2,000 people and included a welcome by Matlow, followed by several musical numbers by Sharon, Lois & Bram and short words of congratulations from various key individuals throughout the trio's career. The ceremony concluded with the unveiling of an elephant-shaped park sign.

=== Lois's death ===
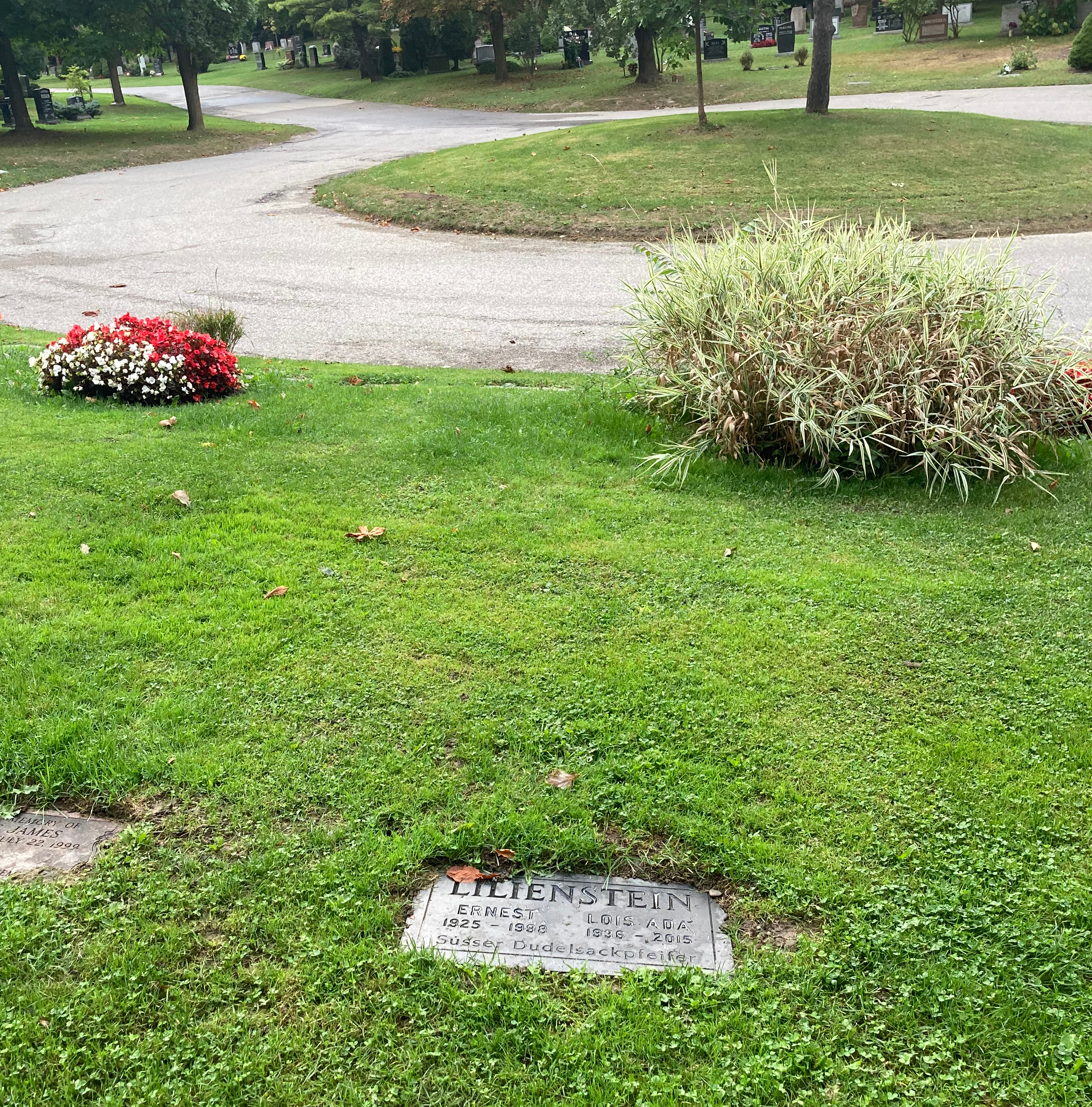
Lilienstein's grave at Mount Pleasant Cemetery

Lois Lilienstein, born Lois Ada Goldberg on July 10, 1936, in Chicago, died on April 22, 2015, aged 78, at her home in Toronto. According to her son David, the cause of death was endometrial cancer. She was buried at Mount Pleasant Cemetery, Toronto. In addition to David, Lilienstein is survived by her granddaughter, Tessa.

=== Later events ===
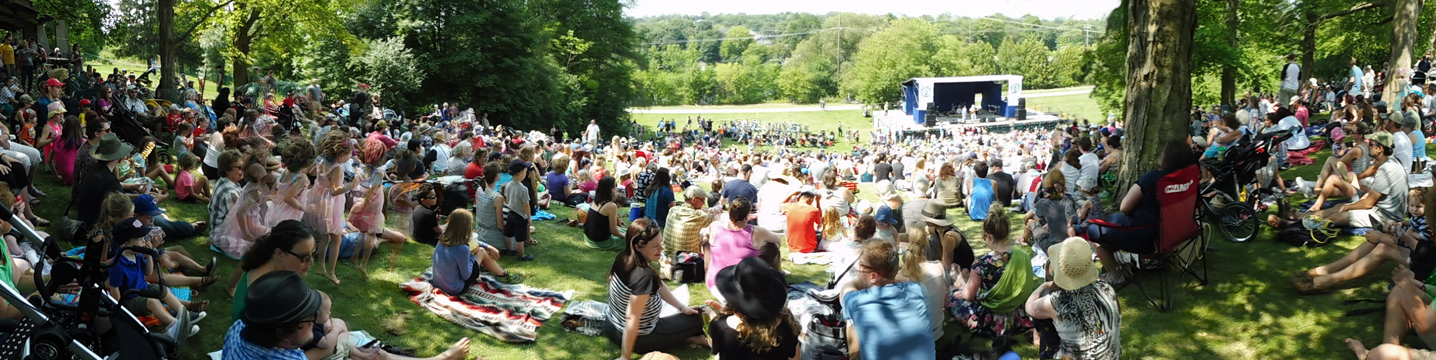
Crowd watching Sharon and Bram onstage at the 2017 Peterborough Folk Festival

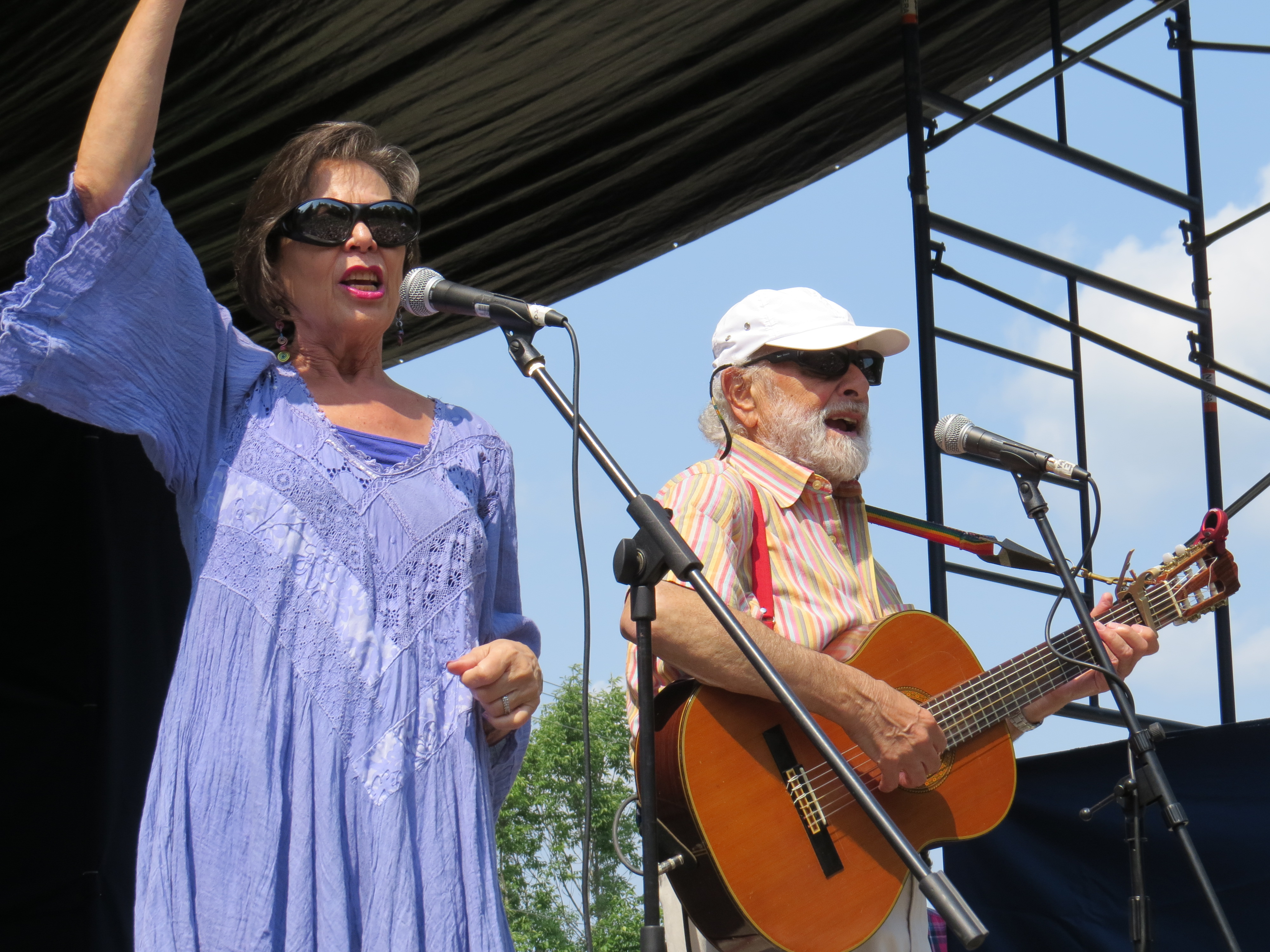
Sharon and Bram onstage at the 2017 Peterborough Folk Festival

Since Lilienstein's death, Hampson and Morrison have continued to perform as Sharon & Bram. In 2018, Sharon & Bram announced a farewell tour. Hampson has continued to perform with her daughter Randi as Sharon & Randi or Sharon, Randi and Friends; Morrison has largely retired from touring, but has continued to contribute as a guest musician on Sharon & Randi recordings.

In May 2019, a children's picture book based on the group's hit song "Skinnamarink" was announced for a September 2019 release.

In April 2020, a Sharon, Lois & Bram YouTube channel launched with Sharon's Great Big Life, a new YouTube series premiering on April 7. The show features Sharon reminiscing about her life on tour, such as filming The Elephant Show and Skinnamarink TV, and each weekly episode will include previously-unseen photos and videos, and a look at Sharon's current life in Toronto. A trailer to promote the web series was released prior to the launch of the show. Season 1 will include eight episodes.

== Awards and honours ==
The group won the Juno Award for Best Children's Album for three of their albums: Smorgasbord (1980), Singing 'n' Swinging (1981), and Skinnamarink TV (2000). These three albums had record sales exceeding 100,000 copies in Canada alone. Three more of their albums achieved the same successful records sales: Mainly Mother Goose, In the Schoolyard, and Sharon, Lois & Bram's Elephant Show Record. The group's influence on children's records extended beyond Canada, with their international sales exceeding 2.5 million dollars in 1991.

In 1996, Sharon, Lois, and Bram each received an Honorary Degree of Doctor of Humane Letters (DHL) from Mount Saint Vincent University in Halifax, Nova Scotia.

In 2002, the three were made members of the Order of Canada. The Chicago-born Lois was named an Honorary Member of the Order, as a non-Canadian. Video of the ceremony appears on the 25-year anniversary movie 25 Years of Skinnamarink.

In 2002, all three received the Queen Elizabeth II Golden Jubilee Medal.

In October 2009, the trio received the Estelle Klein Award from the Ontario Council of Folk Festivals (OCFF) for their significant contributions to Ontario's folk music community. The event weekend included a short video presentation of their life's work and an interview by Richard Flohil.

In 2012, all three received the Queen Elizabeth II Diamond Jubilee Medal.

=== Television awards ===
The Elephant Show

- Parents' Choice Award Hall of Fame - Classics Award and Silver Honors Video for Preschool to Kindergarten, 1991
- Ace Award Nomination - Best International Children's Programming Series, 1990
- Gemini Awards Nomination - Best Performance in a Variety, Comedy or Performing Arts Show, 1989
- National Telemedia Council Special Recognition Award - Excellence in Children's Programming, 1988
- National Telemedia Council Finalist - Best Performers in a Variety of Performing Arts Program or Series, 1988
- Parents' Choice Gold Award - Children's Television, 1986 and 1987
- 30th Annual Intentional Film & TV Festival of New York Silver Medal - Television Entertainment Children's Program, 1987
- Parents' Choice Gold Award -Remarkable Home Video, 1987

Candles, Snow & Mistletoe

- Gemini Awards Nomination - Candles Snow & Mistletoe Best Children's Program or Series, 1995

== Filmography ==
- Sharon, Lois & Bram Downtown Toronto (1979)
- Jungle Jam (1980)
- Sesame Street (1982)
- Today's Special as Special Guests (1983 and 1985)
- Live at Young People's Theater (1983)
- Sharon, Lois & Bram's Elephant Show (TV Series 1984–1989)
- Sharon, Lois & Bram at Toronto Metro Zoo (1985)
- Sharon, Lois & Bram's Elephant Show: Sleepover (A&M Records Video; 1986)
- Sharon, Lois & Bram's Elephant Show: Treasure Island (A&M Records Video; 1986)
- Sharon, Lois & Bram's Elephant Show: Back By Popular Demand – Live at Young People's Theater Downtown Toronto (1987) (A&M Records Video; 1987)
- Sharon, Lois & Bram's Elephant Show: Who Stole the Cookies? (A&M Records Video; 1988)
- Sharon, Lois & Bram's Elephant Show: Soap Box Derby (A&M Records Video; 1988)
- Sharon, Lois & Bram's Elephant Show: Live! In Your Living Room – Live at Young People's Theater Downtown Toronto (September 1984) (A&M Records Video; 1989)
- Sharon, Lois & Bram's Elephant Show: Concert (Cineplex Odeon Films Video; 1989)
- Sharon, Lois & Bram's Elephant Show: Volume 1 – Mysteries (Cineplex Odeon Films Video; 1989)
- Sharon, Lois & Bram's Elephant Show: Volume 2 – Fairy Tales (Cineplex Odeon Films Video; 1989)
- Sharon, Lois & Bram's Elephant Show: Volume 3 – Sports Days (Cineplex Odeon Films Video; 1989)
- Sharon, Lois & Bram's Elephant Show: Volume 4 – Magic (Cineplex Odeon Films Video; 1989)
- Trick-or-Treat with Sharon, Lois & Bram: Children Under the Sun (Unicef; 1989)
- Sing A to Z (1990)/(1994) / ABC's (DVD 2003/2004)
- Sharon, Lois & Bram's Elephant Show: Volume 5 – Trunk Troubles (Cineplex Odeon Films Video; 1991)
- Sharon, Lois & Bram's Elephant Show: Volume 6 – Making News (CFP Video; 1991)
- Sharon, Lois & Bram's Elephant Show: Volume 7 – Summer Fun (CFP Video; 1991)
- Sharon, Lois & Bram's Elephant Show: Volume 8 – Animal Pals (CFP Video; 1992)
- Sharon, Lois & Bram's Elephant Show: Volume 9 – Out & About (CFP Video; 1992)
- Sharon, Lois & Bram's Elephant Show: Volume 10 – Elephant Tales (CFP Video; 1993)
- Sharon, Lois & Bram's Elephant Show: Volume 11 – Elephant Chef (CFP Video; 1993)
- Sharon, Lois & Bram's Elephant Show 1 (Columbia House Video; 1993)
- Sharon, Lois & Bram's Elephant Show 2 (Columbia House Video; 1993)
- Sharon, Lois & Bram's Elephant Show 3 (Columbia House Video; 1993)
- Sharon, Lois & Bram's Elephant Show 4 (Columbia House Video; 1993)
- Sharon, Lois & Bram's Elephant Show 5 (Columbia House Video; 1993)
- Sharon, Lois & Bram's Elephant Show: Radio Show (A&M Records Video; 1994)
- Sharon, Lois & Bram's Elephant Show: Pet Fair (A&M Records Video; 1994)
- Candles, Snow & Mistletoe (1994)
- The Elephant Show: Favorite Songs & Stories (1994)
- Sing Around the Campfire (1994)
- One Elephant Went Out to Play (1994)
- The Toronto Planetarium: Stars & Sun (1995)
- Sharon, Lois & Bram's Elephant Show Volume One (Malofilm Video; 1996)
- Sharon, Lois & Bram's Elephant Show Volume Two (Malofilm Video; 1996)
- Sharon, Lois & Bram's Elephant Show Volume Three (Malofilm Video; 1996)
- Skinnamarink TV (TV Series; 1997–1999)
- Skinnamarink TV: Op-Op-Opposites (1998)
- Skinnamarink TV: Friends Forever (1998)
- Skinnamarink TV: Let's Play Make Believe (Video; 1999) / Make Believe (DVD; 2006)
- Skinnamarink TV: Runaway Rhythm (2000)
- Skinnamarink TV: A "Fun"derful Day (2001)
- TV Smarts for Kids: Part 1 (2001)
- Toddler's Next Steps: ABC & 1-2-3 Songs (St. Clair Entertainment Group; 2003)
- Toddler's Next Steps: Animal Songs (St. Clair Entertainment Group; 2003)
- Toddler's Next Steps: Nursery Rhymes & Bedtime Songs (St. Clair Entertainment Group; 2003)
- Toddler's Next Steps: Playtime & Funtime (St. Clair Entertainment Group; 2003)
- Toddler's Next Steps: Silly Songs (St. Clair Entertainment Group; 2003)
- 25 Years of Skinnamarink (2004)
- The Learn-To Collection: Favorite Children's Classics (2005)
- The Learn-To Collection: Kindergarten Prep (2005)
- The Learn-To Collection 6-Pack (2006)
