= List of Are You Afraid of the Dark? cast members =

This is a list of the cast members of the science fiction/horror-themed children's television series, Are You Afraid of the Dark? The cast members are part of "The Midnight Society" during the series.

== Are You Afraid of the Dark? (1992–1996) cast ==
Actor	Character	Seasons				
Actor	Character	1	2	3	4	5
Ross Hull^{1}	Gary	Main	Main	Main	Main	Main
Jason Alisharan^{1}	Frank	Main	Main	Main	Main	
Rachel Blanchard^{1}	Kristen	Main	Main			
Nathaniel Moreau^{1}	David	Main	Main			
Raine Pare-Coull^{1}	Betty Ann	Main	Main	Main	Main	Main
Jodie Resther^{1}	Kiki	Main	Main	Main	Main	Main
Jacob Tierney^{1}	Eric	Main				
Daniel DeSanto^{2}	Tucker			Main	Main	Main
Joanna García	Samantha			Main	Main	Main
Codie Lucas Wilbee	Stig					Main

== Are You Afraid of the Dark? (1999–2000) cast ==
Actor	Character	Seasons	
Actor	Character	6	7
Kareem Blackwell	Quinn	Main	Main
Elisha Cuthbert	Megan	Main	Main
Daniel DeSanto^{2}	Tucker	Main	Main
David Deveau	Andy	Main	Main
Vanessa Lengies	Vange	Main	Main
Ross Hull^{3}	Gary		Guest

== Are You Afraid of the Dark? (2019–2022) cast ==
Actor	Character	Seasons		
Actor	Character	1	2	3
Lyliana Wray	Rachel Carpenter	Main		
Miya Cech	Akiko Yamato	Main		
Sam Ashe Arnold	Gavin Coscarelli	Main		
Jeremy Ray Taylor	Graham Raimi	Main		
Tamara Smart	Louise Fulci	Main		
Bryce Gheisar	Luke McCoy		Main	
Malia Baker	Gabby Lewis		Main	
Beatrice Kitsos	Hanna Romero		Main	
Parker Queenan	Connor Stevens		Main	
Arjun Athalye	Jai Malya		Main	
Dominic Mariche	Seth Romero		Main	
Telci Huynh	Kayla			Main
Conor Sherry	Max			Main
Luca Padovan	Leo			Main
Dior Goodjohn	Summer			Main
Chance Hurstfield	Ferris			Main

== Notes ==
^{1} The original pilot episode featured a different cast as the Midnight Society, with Ross Hull as David, Mark Bigney as Eric, Robin McKenna as Kristen, Bethanny Nurse as Kiki, Hasani Paris-Crooks as Frank, Marisa Rossy as Betty Ann, and Shane Smythe as Gary. When Are You Afraid of the Dark? was picked up as a series, the pilot was re-shot with the Midnight Society recast.
^{2} Daniel DeSanto (Tucker) is the only actor to be a main cast member in both the 1992–1996 and the 1999–2000 incarnations of Are You Afraid of the Dark?
^{3} Ross Hull (Gary), who starred throughout the entire 1992–1996 run of the incarnation of Are You Afraid of the Dark? guest-starred in the three-part "The Tale of Silver Sight" episode of the 1999–2000 incarnation of the show.
