= List of Are You Afraid of the Dark? episodes =

Are You Afraid of the Dark? is a Canadian-American television series that originally aired from 1992 to 1996. It unofficially premiered with the episode "The Tale of the Twisted Claw" as a pilot on Nickelodeon on October 25, 1991, as a Halloween special. The series officially premiered the following year on Nickelodeon's SNICK on August 15, 1992, and on the Family Channel on September 2, 1992. The series moved from the Family Channel to YTV on September 6, 1993. The original series ended on February 3, 1996, with 5 seasons and 65 episodes.

The series was revived for an additional two seasons and aired on Nickelodeon and the Family Channel from February 6, 1999, to June 11, 2000, with an additional 2 seasons and 26 episodes. In February 2019, it was announced that the series would be rebooted for a limited series, which premiered on October 11, 2019. In February 2020, this reboot of Are You Afraid of the Dark? was renewed for a second season, subtitled Curse of the Shadows, which premiered on February 12, 2021, featuring a different cast. In March 2022, the reboot was renewed for a third season, subtitled Ghost Island, which premiered on July 30, 2022.

During the course of the series, Are You Afraid of the Dark? aired seven seasons for the original and first revival series and three seasons for the reboot.

== Series overview ==
Season	Episodes	Originally released		
Season	Episodes	First released	Last released	Network
Pilot (1991)
Pilot		October 25, 1991		Nickelodeon
Original series (1992–1996)
1	13	August 15, 1992	November 14, 1992	Nickelodeon; Family Channel; YTV
2	13	June 19, 1993	October 2, 1993	Nickelodeon; Family Channel; YTV
3	13	January 8, 1994	April 16, 1994	Nickelodeon; Family Channel; YTV
4	13	October 1, 1994	January 21, 1995	Nickelodeon; Family Channel; YTV
5	13	October 7, 1995	February 3, 1996	Nickelodeon; Family Channel; YTV
1999 revival (1999–2000)
6	13	February 6, 1999	May 15, 1999	Nickelodeon; Family Channel
7	13	April 2, 2000	June 11, 2000	Nickelodeon; Family Channel
2019 reboot (2019–2022)
Carnival of Doom	3	October 11, 2019	October 25, 2019	Nickelodeon
Curse of the Shadows	6	February 12, 2021	March 19, 2021	Nickelodeon
Ghost Island	4	July 30, 2022	August 13, 2022	Nickelodeon

== Original series (1992–1996) ==
=== Season 1 (1992) ===
No. overall	No. in season	Title	Directed by	Written by	Original release date	Prod. code
1	1	"The Tale of the Phantom Cab"	Ron Oliver	Chloe Brown	August 15, 1992 (Note: "The Tale of the Phantom Cab" would later premiere on the Family Channel on September 2, 1992.)	101
Two brothers, Buzz and Deny Crocker while lost in the woods, come across a cab driver and a very unusual man named Dr. Vink, who will not let any of his visitors go unless they solve a riddle.: Storyteller: Frank; Villain: Flynn/Cab Driver and Dr. Vink; Guest star: Aron Tager as Dr. Vink
2	2	"The Tale of Laughing in the Dark"	Ron Oliver	Chloe Brown	August 22, 1992	102
Josh decides to disprove that a funhouse is haunted by stealing the nose of Zeebo, the clown who's supposed to haunt the place. He learns that the story is real when Zeebo pays him a little visit.: Storyteller: Betty Ann; Villain: Zeebo; Guest star: Christian Tessier as Josh; Notable cast: Aron Tager as Zeebo & the Circus Carney
3	3	"The Tale of the Lonely Ghost"	D. J. MacHale	Naomi Janzen	August 29, 1992	103
Amanda, who desperately wants to fit in with her snotty cousin and her group of friends, agrees to spend the night in the haunted house next door to become part of the group.: Storyteller: David; Villain: None; Guest star: Laura Bertram as Amanda; Notable cast: Pauline Little as Aunt Dottie
4	4	"The Tale of the Twisted Claw"	D. J. MacHale	Chloe Brown	September 12, 1992	104
In a twist of "The Monkey's Paw", two boys, Dougie and Kevin Freeman, play a prank on an old woman the night before Halloween. The next night, she gives them a wooden vulture foot that grants wishes with unintended terrifying consequences.: Storyteller: David; Villain: Twisted Claw; Note: "The Tale of the Twisted Claw" aired as a Halloween special on Nickelodeon on October 25, 1991, as the series pilot. Originally, in the pilot version, the Midnight Society consisted of a different cast, including Ross Hull as David. When Are You Afraid of the Dark? was picked up as a series in 1992, the pilot reaired as the fourth episode, with the Midnight Society being completely refilmed and recast with the exception of Ross Hull, whose role was swapped from David to Gary.
5	5	"The Tale of the Hungry Hounds"	D. J. MacHale	Anne Appelton	September 19, 1992	105
Amy and Pam Pease, discover their late aunt's old horse-riding jacket in a trunk. When Pam puts on the jacket, she becomes possessed by the aunt's spirit, who must feed her hungry dogs in order to rest in peace.: Storyteller: Kristen; Villain: Hungry Hounds; Guest star: Mia Kirshner as Pam
6	6	"The Tale of the Super Specs"	Ron Oliver	Chloe Brown	September 26, 1992	106
Weeds, a prankster, buys his girlfriend Marybeth a pair of super spec glasses as part of his April Fools' Day collection, but the joke's on Weeds and Marybeth when they begin to see faceless humans from another dimension.: Storyteller: Gary; Villain: Other Universe; Guest stars: Eugene Byrd as Weeds and Richard Dumont as Sardo
7	7	"The Tale of the Captured Souls"	D. J. MacHale	Anne Appelton	October 3, 1992	107
The Sellman family moves into a small summer home run by a young man, Peter Kirlan III, and things get weird when the daughter, Danny, notices mirrors everywhere and discovers that she and her parents are growing older by the day.: Storyteller: Kiki; Villain: Peter Kirlan III; Notable cast: Ethan Tobman as Peter Kirlan III and Barbara Eve Harris as Sally Sellman
8	8	"The Tale of the Nightly Neighbors"	Jacques Payette	Chloe Brown	October 10, 1992	108
Emma Toll thinks her new Ukrainian neighbors, the Brauns, are vampires, and must do what she can to keep them away from her and her family.: Storyteller: Betty Ann; Villain: The Brauns
9	9	"The Tale of the Sorcerer's Apprentice"	D. J. MacHale	Stephen Zoller	October 17, 1992	109
Dean Berkham, a troubled student, awakens an ancient secret hidden in the school.: Storyteller: Betty Ann; Villain: Dr. Oilver and Goth the Sorcerer
10	10	"The Tale of Jake and the Leprechaun"	D. J. MacHale	Nick Webb	October 24, 1992	110
Jake Joysen, an aspiring young actor, is in a play called the Willo of the Whisp where, during rehearsals, strange things start happening to him when it is only a matter of time before opening night.: Storyteller: Eric; Villain: Erin
11	11	"The Tale of the Dark Music"	Ron Oliver	Chloe Brown	October 31, 1992	111
Andy Carr and his family inherit their deceased uncle's large home. When they move in, things do not start right until Andy finds a hidden entity in the basement. After suffering constant harassment from his next-door neighbor, local teen bully Koda, Andy uses the entity to teach him a lesson.: Storyteller: Eric; Villain: Cellar Demon
12	12	"The Tale of the Prom Queen"	Jean-Marie Comeau	Chloe Brown	November 7, 1992	112
Loosely based on Resurrection Mary, three kids, Dede Larsen, Greg, and Jam, investigate the urban legend of a girl who died on a bridge while waiting for her prom date.: Storyteller: Kristen; Villain: None
13	13	"The Tale of the Pinball Wizard"	D. J. MacHale	Louise Lamarre & Tom Rack	November 14, 1992	113
Ross Campbell, a mischievous kid, goes to the shopping mall and plays a pinball game that comes to life when the mall closes at night.: Storyteller: Gary; Villain: Pinball Wizard; Notable cast: Polly Shannon as Sophie; Note: "The Tale of the Pinball Wizard" was filmed at the Rockland Centre in Mount Royal, Quebec, as can be seen in the end credits. It is also the last appearance of Eric. The reason for his departure was never explained.

=== Season 2 (1993) ===
No. overall	No. in season	Title	Directed by	Written by	Original release date	Prod. code
14	1	"The Tale of the Final Wish"	D. J. MacHale	Chloe Brown	June 19, 1993	201
Jill Petterson, a 13-year old girl who loves fairytales, learns that there's an evil side to "Happily ever after" when The Sandman drags her under the bed and places her family and friends under a sleeping curse.: Storyteller: Kristen; Villain: The Sandman; Guest star: Bobcat Goldthwait as The Sandman
15	2	"The Tale of the Midnight Madness"	D. J. MacHale	Chloe Brown	June 26, 1993	202
Dr. Vink helps an old movie theater in danger of closing by showing a "special" version of the vampire classic, Nosferatu (1922). But little do Pete Matt and Katie Halloran, know they are going to discover a secret they wish they had not about the film.: Storyteller: Frank; Villain: Nosferatu; Guest star: Aron Tager as Dr. Vink and Christopher Heyerdahl as Count Orlok
16	3	"The Tale of Locker 22"	David Winning	Chloe Brown	July 3, 1993	203
A young French girl, Juile Dufaux immigrated in 1993 discovers that the locker at her new school is haunted by a hippie named Candy Warren who died in a chemistry lab accident in 1968 and needs Julix and Chris help in fixing the past.: Storyteller: Kristen; Villain: Shaffner; Guest star: Jennifer Irwin as Candy Warren
17	4	"The Tale of the Thirteenth Floor"	Michael Keusch	Anne Appelton	July 10, 1993	204
Siblings Karen and Billy find that their usual hangout, an unused 13th floor of a building has been replaced by a strange factory filled with extraterrestrial toys and gadgets.: Storyteller: Betty Ann; Villain: Faceless Aliens; Guest star: Christopher Heyerdahl as Leonid
18	5	"The Tale of the Dream Machine"	David Winning	Darren Kotania	July 17, 1993	205
An aspiring writer, Sean Hackett, finds a typewriter, and starts writing stories and learn the power the typewriter has.: Storyteller: Kiki (told by Gary due to Kiki's laryngitis); Villain: None; Note: "The Tale of the Dream Machine" is the only episode to have a story be typed and not told by the actual person who came up with the story.
19	6	"The Tale of the Dark Dragon"	D. J. MacHale	Allison Lea Bingeman	July 24, 1993	206
Keith Saunders was injured in a car crash buys a potion from a magic shop to become the popular boy he wishes he could be, but his deep-seated insecurities begin turning him into a monster, and things get worse when Mariah who has a crush on him steals the potion for herself.: Storyteller: David (for Gary's birthday, borrowing Sardo); Villain: None; Guest star: Richard Dumont as Sardo
20	7	"The Tale of the Frozen Ghost"	Ron Oilver	Naomi Janzen	July 31, 1993	207
Charles Peterton III and his babysitter, Daphne, head off to his aunts' house in the country, where there's a ghost haunting the place during the cold weather.: Storyteller: Kristen; Villain: None; Guest Star: Melissa Joan Hart as Daphne
21	8	"The Tale of the Whispering Walls"	D. J. Machale	Allison Lea Bingerman	August 14, 1993	208
After a day in Play Land, babysitter Louise Lam, and preteens Claire and Andrew Dickens, get lost on the highway and stop at a mansion where things are not what they seem.: Storyteller: Betty Ann; Villain: Master Raymond
22	9	"The Tale of the Full Moon"	Ron Oliver	Ron Oliver	August 21, 1993	209
Pet detectives Jed Harries and Hughie Downs, suspects the Jed's mother's new boyfriend, Ankers, might be a werewolf.: Storyteller: Frank; Villain: None
23	10	"The Tale of the Shiny Red Bicycle"	David Winning	Cassandra Schafhausen	August 28, 1993	210
Mike Buckley is haunted by the ghost of his friend, Ricky Hagerty, who died in a bicycle accident in 1988, and must find out what the ghost wants from him.: Storyteller: David; Villain: None
24	11	"The Tale of the Magician's Assistant"	Ron Oliver	Cassandra Schafhausen	September 11, 1993	211
Todd Marker becomes the new assistant to an elderly stage magician, Shandu, but soon gets into great trouble after he steals the magician's magic wand.: Storyteller: Gary; Villain: Nazrak
25	12	"The Tale of the Hatching"	D. J. MacHale	Chloe Brown	September 25, 1993	212
Siblings Jazz and Augie Wilson, enroll at a boarding school run by a Mr. and Mrs. Taylor. But little do Jazz and Augie know this school has more than learning.: Storyteller: David; Villain: Mr. and Mrs. Taylor and the Giant Lizard Monster
26	13	"The Tale of Old Man Corcoran"	Ron Oliver	Scott Peters	October 2, 1993	213
Jack and Kenny Harris move from a tough city to a quiet neighborhood, where a group of kids invite them to play hide and seek in a cemetery, rumored to be haunted by a ghost known as Old Man Corcoran.: Storyteller: Kiki; Villain: Old Man Corcoran; Note: "The Tale of Old Man Corcoran" is David (Nathaniel Moreau) and Kristen's (Rachel Blanchard) final episode. In "The Tale of the Midnight Ride," Gary mentions that their characters had moved away.

=== Season 3 (1994) ===
No. overall	No. in season	Title	Directed by	Written by	Original release date	Prod. code
27	1	"The Tale of the Midnight Ride"	D. J. MacHale	Darren Kotania	January 8, 1994	301
Ian Matthews moves in to the legendary town of Sleepy Hollow, where he meets a new girlfriend, Katie, the local bully, Brad, and the notorious Headless horseman.: Storyteller: Tucker; Villain: The Headless Horseman; Guest star: Arthur Holden as Ichabod Crane's Ghost; Notable cast: Rachel Wilson as Katie; Note: "The Tale of the Midnight Ride" introduces Tucker to the cast.
28	2	"The Tale of Apartment 214"	Scott Peters	Scott Peters	January 15, 1994	302
Stacey Cooper and her Mom, Bonnie Cooper move into a new apartment only to find that the apartment next door to theirs is occupied by a kindly old woman who's been dead for ten years.: Storyteller: Kiki; Villain: None
29	3	"The Tale of Watcher's Woods"	David Winning	Gregory Kennedy	January 22, 1994	303
After Sarah and Kelly get lost, they discover the terrifying truth behind the legend of "Watcher's Woods".: Storyteller: Sam; Villain: The Watcher; Guest star: Jewel Staite as Kelly; Notable cast: Tom Rack as The watcher; Note: "The Tale of Watcher's Woods" introduces Sam to the cast.
30	4	"The Tale of the Phone Police"	Jean-Marie Comeau	David Preston	January 29, 1994	304
Two prank phone callers named Jake O'Brian and Chris are captured by a covert agency that targets those who do not respect the phone and erase their identities. It is up to Chris to help Jake escape from the Phone Police: Storyteller: Tucker; Villain: The Police/I.R.S. Manager
31	5	"The Tale of the Dollmaker"	David Winning	David Preston	February 5, 1994	305
Melissa suspects that a mysterious dollhouse might be related to the disappearance of her friend Susan.: Storyteller: Betty Ann; Villain: Dollhouse; Notable cast: Amanda Walsh as Susan
32	6	"The Tale of the Bookish Babysitter"	Iain Patterson	Story by : Cliff Bryant & Alice Elliot; Teleplay by : David Preston	February 12, 1994	306
A babysitter named Belinda shows a TV-addicted boy named Ricky Winter that books can be just as exciting as television...especially when the books' characters come to life.: Storyteller: Betty Ann; Villain: Belinda/Witch; Notable cast: Natalie Radford as Belinda
33	7	"The Tale of the Carved Stone"	Ron Oliver	Susan Kim	February 19, 1994	307
A new girl named Allison Denny in town trying to makes friends buys a magic stone, which causes her to go back in time to the 1890s to meet another lonely child named Tom who lived in the house.: Storyteller: Gary; Villain: Brother Septimus; Guest stars: Frank Gorshin as Brother Septimus and Richard Dumont as Sardo.; Notable cast: John White as Tom Bradshaw
34	8	"The Tale of the Guardian's Curse"	D. J. MacHale	Chloe Brown	February 26, 1994	308
Josh and Cleo Duncan, wishing to spend more time with their father, get more than they bargained for when their father's work comes home, in the form of an Egyptian curse and a live mummy.: Storyteller: Tucker; Villain: Dr. Capel-Simth; Guest star: Danny Cooksey as Josh Dugan; Notable cast: Vanessa King as Cleo Dugan; Note: "The Tale of the Guardian's Curse" was filmed at the Montreal Museum of Fine Arts.
35	9	"The Tale of the Curious Camera"	Ron Oliver	Susan Kim	March 19, 1994	309
After complaining about his school picture, a boy named Matt Dorney is gifted a camera by the school photographer and begins using it...only to find that the camera's photos predict doom.: Storyteller: Betty Ann; Villain: the Curious Camera; Guest star: Eddie Kaye Thomas as Matt; Notable cast: Christian Tessier as Kullback
36	10	"The Tale of the Dream Girl"	David Winning	David Preston	March 26, 1994	310
A lonely, teenaged janitor named Johnny Angeli finds a ring in his locker and puts it on. At the same time, a young woman named Donna Maitland begins appearing around him and a chain of strange events make Johnny think Donna is out to get him.: Storyteller: Sam; Villain: None; Notable cast: Fab Filippo as Johnny Angelli
37	11	"The Tale of the Quicksilver"	Michael Keusch	Wendy Brotherlin	April 2, 1994	311
Two boys Aaron and Doug Johnston move into a house that once belonged to Laura Turner who died in a fire trying to exorcise a demon in 1992, (becoming a spirit known as a "Quicksilver"), and now the only way the boys can get rid of the demon is to get help from the dead girl's living twin sister, Connie.: Storyteller: Kiki; Villain: The Demon; Guest star: Tatyana Ali as Laura / Connie; Notable cast: Stuart Stone as Doug Johnston
38	12	"The Tale of the Crimson Clown"	Ron Oliver	Darren Kotania	April 9, 1994	312
After a bratty little boy named Sam blows his brother's money meant for their mother's birthday, His brother Mike warns him that The Crimson Clown, a clown doll at an antique shop, will come after him for being a bad kid. The bratty boy does not think the story is real ... until he finds the clown doll in his room.: Storyteller: Gary; Villain: Crimson Clown; Notable cast: Michael Barry as Sam
39	13	"The Tale of the Dangerous Soup"	D. J. MacHale	Chloe Brown	April 16, 1994	313
A young man named Reed Hansen and a waitress named Nonnie Walker discover the terrifying secret behind their restaurant's most popular item on the menu, and why the staff members keep quitting.: Storyteller: Frank; Villain: Gargoyle; Guest stars: Neve Campbell as Nonnie and Aron Tager as Dr. Vink; Notable cast: Martin Watier as Paul

=== Season 4 (1994–1995) ===
No. overall	No. in season	Title	Directed by	Written by	Original release date	Prod. code
40	1	"The Tale of the Renegade Virus"	Ron Oliver	Andrew Mitchell & Gerard Lewis	October 1, 1994	403
Simon who enjoys playing pranks goes too far one day and is punished by being trapped in a virtual reality game where a demonic virus sets out to infect his brain by Evan Lewis.: Storyteller: Gary; Villain: Renegade Virus
41	2	"The Tale of the Long Ago Locket"	David Winning	Gerald Wexler	October 8, 1994	406
Jimmy is transported back to the Revolutionary War, where he must help a soldier, Lt. William return to his girlfriend, April before he is killed on the battlefield.: Storyteller: Sam; Villain: The Redcoats; Guest star: Will Friedle as Jimmy Armstrong
42	3	"The Tale of the Water Demons"	Ron Oliver	Scott Peters	October 15, 1994	405
Two cousins, Shawn Mackenzie and Dean Wilson, deliver food to an old sea captain who lives in fear of underwater zombies who haunt him the minute he falls asleep.: Storyteller: Tucker; Villain: The Water Demons; Guest star: Tony Sampson as Shawn Mackenzie
43	4	"The Tale of Cutter's Treasure: Part 1"	D. J. MacHale	Chloe Brown	October 22, 1994	401
Part one of two. When a teenager finds a spyglass locked in a treasure chest at Sardo's magic shop, the ghost of an evil pirate is released.: Storytellers: Gary and Frank; Villain: Captain Cutter; Guest stars: Charles S. Dutton as Captain Jonas Cutter, Richard Dumont as Sardo, and Aron Tager as Dr. Vink; Note: "The Tale of Cutter's Treasure: Part 1" was both Dumont and Tager's fourth appearance in the series.
44	5	"The Tale of Cutter's Treasure: Part 2"	D. J. MacHale	Chloe Brown	October 29, 1994	402
Conclusion. Rush Keegan must find a way to save Max Keegan with the help of Dr. Vink and Sardo.: Storytellers: Gary and Frank; Villain: Captain Cutter; Guest stars: Charles S. Dutton as Captain Jonas Cutter, Richard Dumont as Sardo, and Aron Tager as Dr. Vink; Notes: "The Tale of Cutter's Treasue: Part 2" was both Dumont and Tager's fifth appearance in the series. It was also Tager's final appearance as Dr. Vink in the series. It was the only time that Dr. Vink was an ally to the protagonist.
45	6	"The Tale of the Quiet Librarian"	David Winning	Susan Kim	November 5, 1994	404
A forgotten book forces two bitter rivals, Laurie Napier and Jace Ellman to work together to avoid the clutches of a former librarian's spirit who insists that "silence is golden" and traps anyone and anything who makes noise in the library.: Storyteller: Kiki; Villain: The Quiet Librarian
46	7	"The Tale of the Silent Servant"	Jean-Marie Comeau	Wendy Brotherlin	November 12, 1994	407
Jarred and Anne Conner bring a scarecrow to life to do their chores on a farm. It seems like a good idea, until the scarecrow inadvertently is given orders to kill.: Storyteller: Betty Ann; Villain: Soulless Scarecrow; Guest star: Tyler Labine as Mark
47	8	"The Tale of a Room for Rent"	Will Dixon	Lucy Falcone	November 19, 1994	408
A pilot, Jacob killed in combat during World War II, haunts the man he believes killed him and stole his girlfriend, Sara Simpson, the latter of whom is a psychic who allegedly communicates with the dead.: Storyteller: Sam; Villain: None
48	9	"The Tale of the Ghastly Grinner"	Ron Oliver	Ron Oliver	December 3, 1994	409
A young, Ethan Wood, struggling comic book artist unleashes the Ghastly Grinner from a rare comic book, who turns people into drooling, giggling Idiots.: Storyteller: Betty Ann; Villain: the Ghastly Grinner
49	10	"The Tale of the Fire Ghost"	Jean-Marie Comeau	Scott Peters	December 10, 1994	410
While celebrating their dad's birthday at the firehouse, Jimmy and Roxanne Preston are left alone when the firemen go on call. They soon find that there is an incendiary ghost who died in a fire in 1990 and another who's seeking revenge against firemen.: Storyteller: Tucker; Villain: The Fire Ghost
50	11	"The Tale of the Closet Keepers"	Iain Paterson	Story by : Michael Kevis; Teleplay by : David Preston	January 7, 1995	412
Stacy, a deaf girl and her bully, Billy get lost in a strange building, which turns out to be an intergalactic zoo which houses kids from all over the world as the main exhibit.: Storyteller: Kiki; Villain: Keeper
51	12	"The Tale of the Unfinished Painting"	David Winning	Lucy Falcone	January 14, 1995	411
An aspiring young artist, Cody apprentices under the owner of a studio who uses cursed paintbrushes to trap victims inside the paintings they complete and sign.: Storyteller: Gary; Villain: The HUNTER; Guest star: Jewel Staite as Cody
52	13	"The Tale of Train Magic"	D. J. MacHale	Gerald Wexler	January 21, 1995	413
Tim Williamson, obsessed with trains and railroads because of his deceased conductor father, starts playing with a toy train set that transports him inside a train and takes him on a deadly ride.: Storyteller: Frank; Villain: None; Guest star: Gregory Smith as Tim; Note: "The Tale of Train Magic" was the last appearance of Frank; in the next episode, "The Tale of the Dead a Man's Float," Gary mentions he moved away.

=== Season 5 (1995–1996) ===
No. overall	No. in season	Title	Directed by	Written by	Original release date	Prod. code
53	1	"The Tale of the Dead Man's Float"	D. J. MacHale	Will Dixon	October 7, 1995	501
A science geek named Zeke Matthews and his crush, swimming team member Clorice, discover the school's abandoned swimming pool and petition that it be reopened...unaware that there was a bloody reason why the pool was shut down in the first place.: Storyteller: Stig; Villain: The BLOODY Corpus; Guest star: Jay Baruchel as Joe; Notes: This was Baruchel's first and last appearance in the original series. Introduces Stig to the cast.
54	2	"The Tale of the Jagged Sign"	Will Dixon	Susan Kim	October 21, 1995	502
Spending her summer break at her aunt's retirement home was not Claudia's first choice, but it turns out to be more interesting than she expected when a ghostly boy begins stalking her.: Storyteller: Kiki; Villain: None; Guest star: Hillary Hawkins as Kate
55	3	"The Tale of Station 109.1"	Ron Oliver	Scott Peters	November 4, 1995	503
Cris Leary, obsessed with death discovers a radio station which takes its listeners to the afterlife, and is mistaken for a recently-deceased man by the radio station's obnoxiously loud, squinty-eyed psychopomp/DJ.: Storyteller: Stig; Villain: D.J. Roy; Guest stars: Ryan Gosling as Jamie and Gilbert Gottfried as DJ Roy.
56	4	"The Tale of the Mystical Mirror"	Craig Pryce	David Wiechorek	November 11, 1995	504
A teenage girl named Cindy gets a job at a local make-up shop run by a former beauty queen, but a chain of strange events and disappearances lead Cindy to discover the real reason behind her boss's beauty.: Storyteller: Betty Ann; Villain: Ms. Valenti; Guest star: Laura Bertram as Laurel
57	5	"The Tale of Prisoners Past"	Ron Oliver	Alan Kingsberg	November 18, 1995	505
Two unlikely stepbrothers, Scott and Jason help an old prison ghost reunite with his adult daughter.: Storyteller: Tucker; Villain: None; Guest star: Christopher Castile as Jason
58	6	"The Tale of C7"	David Winning	David Preston	December 2, 1995	506
A family moves into a house by the lake where an ancient jukebox revives the memory of a fallen soldier.: Storyteller: Sam; Villain: None; Note: "The Tale of C7" was the last episode to be directed by David Winning.
59	7	"The Tale of the Manaha"	Will Dixon	Gerald Wexler	December 9, 1995	507
A blithe boy name Jonah enlists in a camping expedition with a group of misfits where an ancient, Native American legend has awoken in the woods and is out to feast.: Storyteller: Tucker; Villain: Shaman; Guest star: Michael Greyeyes as The Shaman
60	8	"The Tale of Badge"	Iain Patterson	Wendy Brotherlin	December 30, 1995	508
Gwen Reilly, an insecure girl who does not believe in her musical talent, gets a chance to test her gift when a creature called Badge kidnaps her brother, Trevor Reilly, and Gwen discovers that she's next in line to carry on the magic on the Irish side of her family.: Storyteller: Gary; Villain: Badge
61	9	"The Tale of the Unexpected Visitor"	Jacques Laberge	Alan Kingsberg	January 6, 1996	509
Jeff Sherman and Perch, accidentally contact aliens through the sound equipment on one of their father's computers.: Storyteller: Kiki; Villain: Aliens
62	10	"The Tale of the Chameleons"	Iain Patterson	Mark D. Perry	January 13, 1996	510
Janice Robinson, reckless teenage girl gets bitten by a chameleon that turns out to be a shapeshifter bent on switching lives with her.: Storyteller: Betty Ann; Villain: Janice's Doppelganger/Chameleons; Guest stars: Tia and Tamera Mowry as Janice and The Chameleon
63	11	"The Tale of the Vacant Lot"	Lorette LeBlanc	Gerald Wexler	January 20, 1996	511
Catherine Crawley discovers a mysterious, open-air market run by a woman in a burqa who provides her everything she needs to be popular...for a very high price.: Storyteller: Kiki; Villain: Marie
64	12	"The Tale of a Door Unlocked"	Ron Oliver	Scott Peters	January 27, 1996	512
Sardo sells a magic door to Justin which, once he opens, reveals the future, and must use the door to save his crush, Ashily from impending doom.: Storyteller: Gary; Villain: None; Note: "The Tale of a Door Left Unlocked" was Dumont's sixth and final appearance as Sardo in the original series.
65	13	"The Tale of the Night Shift"	D. J. MacHale	Chloe Brown	February 3, 1996	513
A night shift hospital volunteer named Amanda soon discovers that a vampire is lurking the halls and feeding off the staff and patients.: Storyteller: Sam; Villain: Vampire; Guest star: Emmanuelle Chriqui as Amanda, Tyrone Benskin as Jack Palmer and Jorgito Vargas Jr. as Felix

== 1999 revival (1999–2000) ==
=== Season 6 (1999) ===
No. overall	No. in season	Title	Directed by	Written by	Original release date	Prod. code
66	1	"The Tale of the Forever Game"	Iain Patterson	Mark D. Perry	February 6, 1999	601
A teen boy named Peter, finds himself trapped, along with his best friend Mark and sister Monica, as pawns in a life or death board game in the woods.: Storyteller: Tucker; Villain: Nathaniel and the Burden Beast; Guest star: Kyle Downes as Nathaniel
67	2	"The Tale of the Gruesome Gourmets"	Lorette LeBlanc	Michael Koegel	February 13, 1999	602
Two boys, Tommy and David, suspect that their chubby, overly-cheery new neighbors may be cannibals.: Storyteller: Megan; Villain: None; Guest Start: Kathleen Fee as Dotty; Note: "The Tale of the Gruesome Gourmets" was Kathnleen Fee's second appearance in the series overall (Her first was in "The Tale of the Night Shift," as Nurse Hantin).
68	3	"The Tale of the Zombie Dice"	Adam Weissman	Maggie Leigh	February 20, 1999	603
Alex, Tate, and Andre go to a new arcade owned by a man named Click, who has a strange way of dealing with anyone who loses at his games.: Storyteller: Vange; Villain: Click; Guest star: Jay Baruchel as Alex; Note: "The Tale of the Zombie Dice" was Baruchel's first appearance in the revival series and second appearance overall.
69	4	"The Tale of the Misfortune Cookie"	Adam Weissman	Mark D. Perry	February 27, 1999	604
David Lee, a struggling comic book artist slaving away at his parents' failing Chinese restaurant, take his grandfather's golden fortune cookies and wishes that his life would be better, which sends him into an alternate reality where he's famous and the restaurant is successful, but his family does not know who he is and a samurai clad in black is after David.: Storyteller: Andy; Villain: The Bad Side Samurai; Guest Star: Adam MacDonald as Eddy West
70	5	"The Tale of Jake the Snake"	Lorette LeBlanc	Michael Koegel	March 13, 1999	605
A struggling ice hockey player named Wiley finds a former hockey great's stick and uses it to ace the try-outs, but soon discovers that the stick has cursed him into becoming a snake.: Storyteller: Tucker; Villain: Jake "The Snake" Desomond
71	6	"The Tale of the Virtual Pets"	Iain Patterson	Alice Eve Cohen	March 20, 1999	606
When all the kids at school get virtual pets, it changes them in a very scary way. Luckily, Kate is not tech-savvy, and must save her friends from becoming slaves to the Diggers that live inside the toys.: Storyteller: Vange; Villain: The Digger
72	7	"The Tale of the Hunted"	Lorette LeBlanc	Gaylen James	March 27, 1999	607
Diana living in rural Canada is pressured by her dad and friends to go wolf hunting with them, and a mysterious wolf known as The Blaze curses the girl to live life as an animal being hunted for sport.: Storyteller: Andy; Villain: The Blaze
73	8	"The Tale of the Wisdom Glass"	Jacques Laberge	Mark D. Perry	April 3, 1999	608
Allan and Jimmy are in for a cyber shock after Allan tricks Jimmy into shoplifting a computer game called "The Wisdom Glass" and find themselves transported to a strange game-world where they end up on trial for the theft of the game.: Storyteller: Quinn; Villain: The people in the Cyberworld
74	9	"The Tale of the Walking Shadow"	Lorette LeBlanc	Matthew Cope	April 10, 1999	609
When the local high school decides to do the stage play Macbeth (known as "The Scottish Play" due to the popular theater superstition of not mentioning Macbeth by name), it unleashes some terrifying ghosts lurking backstage. Ross Doyle and Vanessa find out why the play is haunted and must get rid of the curse without getting blood on their hands.: Storyteller: Megan; Villain: Adrian; Guest star: Jay Baruchel as Ross Doyle; Note: "The Tale of the Walking Shadow" was Baruchel's second appearance in the first revived era and third appearance overall.
75	10	"The Tale of Vampire Town"	Mark Soulard	Allison Lea Bingeman	April 17, 1999	610
Adder Carballo, a spoiled goth boy obsessed with vampire lore, finds himself getting more than he bargained when he finds himself face-to-face with real-life bloodsucking fiends.: Storyteller: Quinn; Villain: Vampire and Stanley; Guest star: Kyle Downes as Adder; Note: Downes had previously appeared in "The Tale of the Forever Game" as a different character. "The Tale of Vampire Town" was his last appearance.
76	11	"The Tale of Oblivion"	Jim Donovan	James Morris	April 24, 1999	611
Max, tired of being pushed into lame recreational activities and lessons, learns how to erase his problems, literally with an enchanted art kit, complete with a pencil that makes drawings real and an eraser that sends them to a dimension where all that's forgotten reside...including a bloodthirsty Viking that was kept there due to being too dangerous to live in the real world.: Storyteller: Tucker; Villain: Kronos the Conqueror; Guest star: Richard Dumont as Sardo; Note: "The Tale of Oblivion" was Dumont's first appearance as Sardo in the revival series and seventh appearance overall.
77	12	"The Tale of the Secret Admirer"	Mark Soulard	Eric Weiner	May 8, 1999	612
Shy Meggie Evans is thrilled when she discovers she has a secret admirer, but her excitement turns to fear when she realizes her admirer is from beyond the grave...and out for revenge.: Storyteller: Megan; Villain: Teddy Mars
78	13	"The Tale of Bigfoot Ridge"	Lorette LeBlanc	Randy Holland	May 15, 1999	613
In search of their missing friend, Gina, siblings Danielle and Kirk venture into a mountain area haunted by a creature who captures its prey in the darkness.: Storyteller: Tucker; Villain: The Umbra; Guest star: Hayden Christensen as Kirk

=== Season 7 (2000) ===
No. overall	No. in season	Title	Directed by	Written by	Original release date	Prod. code
79	1	"The Tale of the Silver Sight, Part 1"	Mark Soulard	D. J. MacHale	April 2, 2000	711
Gary, the President of The Midnight Society from the original episodes, is back and needs the help of his brother Tucker and his friends to help track down the members of the First Midnight Society from 1937. Together, they must solve an ancient mystery and prevent an evil force from being unleashed on the world. The first episode of the Tale of the Silver Sight focuses on Tucker and Gary's search for "The General" and his clue to the puzzle.: Storyteller: None; Villain: The evil spirit; Special guest star: Ross Hull as Gary; Guest star: Ryan Cooley as Waif Kid
80	2	"The Tale of the Silver Sight, Part 2"	Mark Soulard	D. J. MacHale	April 2, 2000	712
The Midnight Society splits up and goes in search of the original members who each hold a clue to the mystery. The second episode of the Tale of the Silver Sight focuses on Quinn's search for "The Homecoming Queen" and Megan's search for "The Tycoon".: Storyteller: None; Villain: The evil spirit; Special guest star: Ross Hull as Gary; Guest star: Ryan Cooley as Waif Kid
81	3	"The Tale of the Silver Sight, Part 3"	Mark Soulard	D. J. MacHale	April 2, 2000	713
The Midnight Society continues to go in search of the original members who each hold a clue to the mystery. The third and final episode of the Tale of the Silver Sight focuses on Vange and Andy's search for "The Riddle Man".: Storyteller: Gary and Tucker's grandfather, Gene; Villain: The evil spirit; Special guest star: Ross Hull as Gary; Guest star: Ryan Cooley as Waif Kid; Note: The Tale of the Silver Sight saga were the final episodes produced for the revival series and serve as the series finale, though they were not the final episodes aired.
82	4	"The Tale of the Stone Maiden"	Adam Weissman	Mark D. Perry	April 9, 2000	701
In a loose parody of the Greek story Pygmalion, a boy named Kevin Tyler (who just broke up with his girlfriend, Julie Hart) happens upon a stone statue of a maiden and drinks from the water flowing out of its urn...only to learn that the "water" is actually a potion that turns anyone who drinks it to stone and that the statue was meant to have a mate.: Storyteller: Megan; Villain: The Maiden Statue; Guest star: Kathleen Fee as the sculptor Vivian White.; Note: "The Tale of the Stone Maiden" was Kathleen Fee's third appearance overall.
83	5	"The Tale of the Laser Maze"	Mark Soulard	Peggy Sarlin	April 16, 2000	702
Athletic, overly-competitive twins Ashley and Kara Fox must learn together if they stand any chance of escaping a strange version of laser tag in which the winners get cloned and sent to other planets.: Storyteller: Tucker; Villain: Drake the alien/laser maze owner; Guest star: Laura Vandervoort
84	6	"The Tale of the Reanimator"	Adam Weissman	Kenny Davis	April 23, 2000	703
In a loose homage to the 1985 comedy horror film, Re-Animator, Julie works at a greenhouse with her boss, Doyle, a widowed scientist who just invented a chemical that can bring plants to life, but many unforeseen side effects on humans.: Storyteller: Quinn; Villain: Reanimated Zombie
85	7	"The Tale of the Lunar Locusts"	Jim Donovan	Michael Koegel	April 30, 2000	704
A new, mysterious girl called Ellen, shows up at school and knows about a threat that could kill off the planet, and only the help of a jock called Jake and a popular girl called Julie can save the world.: Storyteller: Megan; Villain: The unborn alien babies; Guest Star: Figure skater Tara Lipinski as Ellen and Aaron Ashmore as Jake
86	8	"The Tale of Highway 13"	Adam Weissman	Kenny Davis	May 7, 2000	705
Best friends Craig and Justin fix up a wrecked V8 from a junkyard and get caught up in a dark deal with a group of ghosts from a car crash in 1969.: Storyteller: Quinn; Villain: None; Guest stars: Benjamin Plener as Justin and Adam MacDonald as Bulldog; Note: It was Plener's second appearance in the series overall (his first was in "The Tale of Jake and the Leprechaun," as Jake). It was also MacDonald's second appearance in the series overall (his first was in "The Tale of the Misfortune Cookie," as Eddy West).
87	9	"The Tale of the Photo Finish"	Mark Soulard	Alan Kingsberg	May 14, 2000	706
Alex and Chandler have been accepted to a boarding school -- one on scholarship, the other as a legacy since he had ancestors who were alumni -- try to save their friendship when the legacy gets accepted into a secret society that's being haunted by a bullied student who uses photography to trap those who caused his death.: Storyteller: Andy; Villain: Jasper Davis
88	10	"The Tale of the Time Trap"	Mark Soulard	Peggy Sarlin	May 21, 2000	707
Jason Midas who sees himself as a loser buys a Persian victory box at Sardo's curio shop...and gets more than he bargained for when a tastelessly-dressed genie named Belle comes out of the box and grants the boy's wishes -- with disastrous results.: Storyteller: Tucker; Villain: Belle the Genie; Guest stars: Jay Baruchel as Jason and Richard Dumont as Sardo; Note: "The Tale of the Time Trap" were the final appearances of Jay Baruchel and Richard Dumont as Sardo of the revival series and the series overall.
89	11	"The Tale of the Last Dance"	Jim Donovan	Mark D. Perry	May 28, 2000	708
In a loose homage to Gaston Leroux's The Phantom of the Opera, Tara Martin is a violinist who wishes someone would appreciate her talents, as her boyfriend, Michael does not, and gets her wish from a strange mutant figure who lives inside the school.: Storyteller: Andy; Villain: None
90	12	"The Tale of Many Faces"	Lorette LeBlanc	Alan Kingsberg	June 4, 2000	709
Emma, a self-conscious teen model unwittingly joins a cult of faceless girls who had their looks stolen from them by a Madame Visage and makes them her slaves.: Storyteller: Vange; Villain: Madame Visage; Guest stars: Sarah Edmondson as Emma
91	13	"The Tale of the Night Nurse"	Mark Soulard	Michael Koegel	June 11, 2000	710
Two teen girls, Nicki and A.J. spend the week at their grandfather's house and find themselves reliving the events that led to the death of one of the house's previous occupants at the hands of a live-in nurse.: Storyteller: Vange; Villain: The Nurse; Note: "The Tale of the Night Nurse" was the final episode to air for the 1999 revival and the entire series before the series was rebooted 19 years later in 2019.

== 2019 revival (2019–2022) ==
=== Season 1: Carnival of Doom (2019) ===
No. overall	No. in season	Title	Directed by	Written by	Original release date	Prod. code	U.S. viewers (millions)
92	1	"Part I: Submitted for Approval"	Dean Israelite	BenDavid Grabinski	October 11, 2019	801	0.75
As the new girl in school, Rachel feels out of place until The Midnight Society invites her to join the group. All she has to do is tell a terrifying story.: Storyteller: Rachel
93	2	"Part II: Opening Night"	Dean Israelite	BenDavid Grabinski	October 18, 2019	802	0.82
After a disappearance links to Rachel's story, The Midnight Society decides to go to the Carnival of Doom.
94	3	"Part III: Destroy All Tophats"	Dean Israelite	BenDavid Grabinski	October 25, 2019	803	0.69
Rachel decides to take charge and end Tophat's reign of horror.

=== Season 2: Curse of the Shadows (2021) ===
No. overall	No. in season	Title	Directed by	Written by	Original release date	Prod. code	U.S. viewers (millions)
95	1	"The Tale of the Haunted Woods"	Jeff Wadlow	JT Billings	February 12, 2021	901	0.50
Five kids investigate the disappearance of their friend, the leader of The Midnight Society, whose fate may be tied to a mysterious curse that haunts their seaside town.: Storyteller: Sardo (Magic Shop Owner)
96	2	"The Tale of the Night Frights"	Jeff Wadlow	JT Billings	February 19, 2021	902	0.32
As the Midnight Society digs deeper into the mystery, they discover themselves haunted by an evil entity known as the Shadowman.
97	3	"The Tale of the Phantom Light"	Mathias Herndl	Alex Ebel	February 26, 2021	903	0.30
The Midnight Society seeks help from an unlikely source – the ghost of someone who may know how the curse was created a generation earlier.
98	4	"The Tale of the Danse Macabre"	Mathias Herndl	JT Billings	March 5, 2021	904	0.40
On the eve of the school dance, the Midnight Society wrestles with the possibility that evil still lurks among them and the nightmare is far from over.
99	5	"The Tale of the Midnight Magic"	Jeff Wadlow	JT Billings and Alex Ebel	March 12, 2021	905	0.27
With dark forces growing stronger and the curse claiming another victim, a shattered Midnight Society prepares to fight back against the Shadowman.
100	6	"The Tale of the Darkhouse"	Jeff Wadlow	JT Billings	March 19, 2021	906	0.49
Luke gets help from the beyond to uncover more supernatural secrets, and devises a bold plan to finally end the curse of the shadows.

=== Season 3: Ghost Island (2022) ===
No. overall	No. in season	Title	Directed by	Written by	Original release date	Prod. code	U.S. viewers (millions)
101	1	"The Tale of Room 13"	Dean Israelite	JT Billings and Chris Bruno & David Howard Lee	July 30, 2022	1001	0.22
A group of friends, calling themselves The Midnight Society, travel to an island resort, following the wishes of their deceased friend. However, they find more than they bargained for as the hotel has a dark history involving the mysterious Room 13, where all guests who stayed there disappeared.: Storyteller: Max
102	2	"The Tale of the Teen Spirit"	Dean Israelite	JT Billings and Chris Bruno & David Howard Lee	July 30, 2022	1002	0.22
After hearing about Room 13, the former Midnight Society tries to find answers to its strange disappearances over the years. But are the people who vanished really gone from the hotel?
103	3	"The Tale of the Looking Glass"	Dean Israelite	Alison Wilber	August 6, 2022	1003	0.35
With the spirit from the mirror released, the group scrambles to hide to avoid her wrath, then through a mysterious diary discover the ghost's origins and just how the curse on Room 13 came to be.: Storyteller: Kayla
104	4	"The Tale of the Other Side"	Dean Israelite	JT Billings & Christina K. Moore	August 13, 2022	1004	0.24
Upon learning the truth of Cutter, Kayla is trapped in the mirror in Room 13 and must find a way to escape and warn her friends before its too late.
