= Nicole Lyn =

Canadian actress (born 1978)

- Occupation: Actress
- Spouse: Dulé Hill (m. 2004, divorced)

Nicole Lyn is a Canadian actress. She is best known for her roles as Susan Kushner in Ramona and Emily Roberts on the Canadian teen comedy series Student Bodies.

== Early life ==
Lyn was born to a Jamaican mother and a Chinese-born father.

== Career ==
She auditioned for and was admitted to Claude Watson School for the Arts at age 10. She worked filming commercials, guest starring roles, and had co-starring role on the Canadian kid-com Eric's World (1991). She later auditioned for and attended Cardinal Carter Academy for the Arts in Toronto from grade 7 - 9, where she was a dance major.

She later moved to Jamaica (where her father resides) in grade 10 and attended Belair High School in Mandeville.

One of her first auditions upon returning to Canada was for the YTV teen sitcom Student Bodies (1997), on which she landed a lead role alongside Jamie Elman, Katie Emme McIninch, Ross Hull, Jennifer Finnigan, and Mark Taylor.

Lyn made her acting debut in the television series Ramona.

She has made television guest appearances on The Kids in the Hall, Are You Afraid of the Dark?, Relic Hunter, Andy Richter Controls the Universe, My Secret Identity, The West Wing, Half & Half, and Psych. She was a series regular in the Canadian television shows Eric's World and Student Bodies.

Lyn also appeared in the television film, "The Feast Of All Saints" based on an Anne Rice novel of the same name.

Lyn has appeared in television films such as On Thin Ice: The Tai Babilonia Story and Dying To Dance, and appeared in the feature film Deliver Us From Eva.

Lyn also DJs under the name "Ms. Nix" and serves as an announcer on MTV2's Hip Hop Squares.

== Personal life ==
On July 10, 2004, Lyn married actor Dulé Hill. They had no children. Hill and Lyn separated on July 21, 2012 and filed for legal separation in November 2012 citing irreconcilable differences.
