= Kenny Vadas =

Canadian actor (born 1981)

- Born: July 25, 1981 (age 43); Montreal, Quebec, Canada
- Occupation: Actor
- Years active: 1990–2001

Ken "Kenny" Vadas (born July 25, 1981) is a Canadian actor best known for his role in The Santa Clause and several television shows.

== Career ==
Vadas began his career by acting in several commercials. He was a regular on the Eric's World and had guest roles on Are You Afraid of the Dark?, Goosebumps, and The Adventures of Sinbad.

He acted in several made-for-television movies and appeared as the E.L.F.S. Leader in the Disney Christmas film The Santa Clause.

Vadas also played the lead role of Harvey Cheyne in the television remake of Captains Courageous starring Robert Urich. Vadas received a Family Film Award nomination and won a Young Artist Award.

Vadas appeared as Prince Cosimo in the HBO television movie, Galileo: On The Shoulders of Giants, which he co-starred Michael Moriarty.

== Filmography ==
Year	Title	Role	Notes
1990	Eric's World	Nat	
1993	Are You Afraid of the Dark?	Willy	Episode: The Tale of the Hatching
1994	The Santa Clause	E.L.F.S. Leader	
1996	Captains Courageous	Harvey Cheyne, Jr.	TV movie
1996	Goosebumps	Duane Comack	Episode: The Headless Ghost
1997	The Adventures of Sinbad	Sali	Episode: Masked Marauders
1997	Galileo: On The Shoulders of Giants	Prince Cosimo	TV movie
2001	Our Hero	Hennesy	Episode: The Psycho Issue
