= Eric Nagler =

Canadian musician (born 1942)

- Born: June 1, 1942 (age 84); Brooklyn, New York
- Spouse: Martha Beers (m. 1966, div. 1977)
- Partner: Diana Buckley

Eric Nagler (born June 1, 1942 in Brooklyn, New York) is an American musician and television personality known primarily for his work on Canadian children's television series such as The Elephant Show and Eric's World.

== Biography ==
Eric Nagler was born in Brooklyn, New York on June 1, 1942 to two schoolteachers, Mr. and Mrs. Harold Nagler. His family were Jewish atheists.

Initially, Nagler was a folk musician in the United States, performing in the Greenwich Village folk scene. In 1966 he marched through Mississippi with Martin Luther King Jr., encouraging people to register to vote. In May 1968 he married fellow musician Martha Beers, daughter of Bob and Evelyne Beers of the folk group the Beers Family.

Eric Nagler studied at Queens College and Albany State University, and earned a Master's degree in child psychology. He worked for the New York Department of Education, teaching special needs children.

Due to their conscientious objection to the Vietnam War, the couple moved to Toronto in 1968 in order to “avoid” the draft. Upon relocating to Canada, he worked as a psychologist, and began work on a doctorate at the University of Toronto. In 1972, Nagler returned to the United States to stand trial for draft evasion; he was acquitted.

Around 1971, Eric and Martha owned a guitar/folk-music store on Avenue Road in Toronto called the Toronto Folklore Centre. The couple later moved to a cabin in Killaloe, Ontario, and toured together as a folk duo across the United States and Canada. The couple divorced in 1977.

Since 1991 Nagler has lived with his partner Diana Buckley in the hills of Mulmur, near Shelburne, an hour north of Toronto, Ontario, and home of the Annual Canadian Championship Fiddling Contest.

In the 1970s and 1980s Nagler performed on Sharon, Lois, and Bram's albums, toured with the trio, and was a regular guest star on the Elephant Show since its premiere in 1984. In 1991–1996, he starred in a children's TV show called Eric's World, which aired on the Canadian provincial networks (TVOntario, Knowledge Network, SCN, and Access) and Family Channel.

== Instruments ==
Nagler plays a variety of instruments, often homemade or improvised, in the skiffle style.

== Awards and recognition ==
- 1983: Notable Children's Recordings, American Library Association for the album Fiddle Up a Tune
- 1986: nomination, Juno Award for Best Children's Album, Come On In
- 1990: nomination, Juno Award for Best Children's Album, Improvise with Eric Nagler
- 1994: nomination, Juno Award for Best Children's Album, Can't Sit Down
- 1995: nomination, Juno Award for Best Children's Album, Eric's World Record

== Discography ==
This is a partial listing:

- 1971: contributed to High Winds, White Sky by Bruce Cockburn
- 1973: The Gentleness in Living (Philo)
- 1977: A Right and Proper Dwelling (Swallowtail)
- 1982: Fiddle Up a Tune (Elephant) (producer Paul Mills)
- 1985: Come On In (Elephant) (producer Paul Mills)
- 1989: Improvise with Eric Nagler (Oak Street/Rounder)
- 1992: Can't Sit Down
- 1994: Eric's World Record

== Filmography ==
- 1984–1989: The Elephant Show
- 1990–1995: Eric's World

== Bibliography ==
- 1989: Eric Nagler makes music, co-writer Diana Buckley (McGraw-Hill Ryerson) ISBN 0-07-549777-8
