= Kyle Downes =

Canadian-American actor

- Born: Kyle Joseph Downes; March 18, 1983 (age 43); Summertown, Tennessee, U.S.
- Occupation: Actor
- Years active: 1995–present

Kyle Joseph Downes (born March 18, 1983) is a Canadian-American actor, best known for his recurring role as Larry Tudgeman in the Disney Channel Original Series Lizzie McGuire and his characterization of Ezra Friedken in Higher Ground. He was born in Summertown, Tennessee. His other television acting credits include Are You Afraid of the Dark?, Boston Public, CSI: Miami, The Famous Jett Jackson, The L Word, Goosebumps and La Femme Nikita.
