= Tetona Jackson =

American actress

- Born: January 11, 1989 (age 37)
- Occupation: Actress
- Years active: 2011–present

Tetona Jackson is an American actress. She is best known for playing Simone Graham in the sitcom Boomerang and Nina in the sitcom Poppa's House.

== Early life ==
Jackson was born to Jazz musician Fred Jackson Jr..She would go to gigs and watch him perform which inspired her to become an entertainer. She did musical theatre growing up and was a figure skater who went on tour with Disney on Ice.

== Career ==
Jackson made her on-screen debut as a background dancer on the Nickelodeon series Victorious. She also played a dancer in the Disney Channel show Austin & Ally Her first big role came playing Cassie Fulner in the teen comedy series All Night . She played the lead role of Simone Graham in the reboot series Boomerang She had a recurring role playing Mabel on the drama series Good Troub;e. She played Nina, one of the lead roles of the sitcom Poppa's House.

== Personal life ==
Jackson is in a relationship with Boomerang co-star Tequan Richmond. In early 2021 they welcomed a daughter named Harlie.

== Filmography ==
=== Film ===
Year	Title	Role	Notes
2015	Stolen From Suburbia	Courtney	
2016	Maximum Ride	Nudge	
2016	Dear Diary I Died	Marisa	
2018	Save Me from Love	Kris	
2018	All Styles	Lark	
2020	Blood on Her Badge	Gloria	
2021	The Housewives of The North Pole	Kendall	
2021	Work wife	Naomi Taylor	
2025	Severed Road	Tina	

=== Television ===
Year	Title	Role	Notes
2011-2012	Victorious	Dancer	3 episodes
2013	Austin & Ally	Dancer	Episode; Viral Videos & Very Bad Dancing
2014	Happyland	Princess Veronique	Episode; Your Happyland Family
2018	All Night	Cassie Fulner	10 episodes
2019-2020	Boomerang	Simone Graham	18 episodes
2021-2022	Home Economics	JoJo	6 episodes
2022	Dynasty	Frankie Chase	Episode; Vicious Vendetta
2023-2024	Good Trouble	Mabel	11 episodes
2024-2025	Poppa's House	Nina	18 episodes
2025-2026	Chicago Med	Esme Lockhart	4 episodes
