= Maximum Ride (film) =

2016 science fiction film

- Theatrical release poster
- Directed by: Jay Martin
- Screenplay by: Angelique Hanus; Jesse Spears
- Based on: Maximum Ride by James Patterson
- Produced by: Gary Binkow; Amee Dolleman
- Starring: Allie Marie Evans; Patrick Johnson; Lyliana Wray; Luke Gregory Crosby; Gavin Lewis; Tetona Jackson; Zayne Emory; Carrie Wampler; Peter O'Brien
- Cinematography: Ed Wu
- Edited by: Joel Griffen
- Music by: Bowie Dinkel; Kelvin Pimont
- Production companies: JP Entertainment; Studio 71
- Distributed by: Paramount Pictures
- Release date: August 30, 2016
- Running time: 88 minutes
- Country: United States
- Language: English

Maximum Ride is a 2016 American science fiction film based on the novel series of the same name by James Patterson. It adapts the first half of The Angel Experiment, the first book in the series. YouTube personality Jenna Marbles served as an executive producer of the film.

== Plot ==
Jeb rescues Max and the other children from the School. His son Ari is left behind and presumed dead. In the present, Max is seen waking up from a dream; upon waking up, she encounters other members of the Flock. Iggy explains that they're running out of food, but Max wants to remain in the house. Angel is then captured by Erasers.

The Flock returns to the house and find the schools location. They decide that Fang and Max will go to rescue Angel, while the others will remain home. Ari went to the house looking for Max, but they fight him off and escape, but Ari is left alive.

Max and Fang stop to eat on a rooftop in Utah, where Max hears a girl being attacked. Fang tells Max not to intervene, but Max flies down to help before being shot in the shoulder. Fang smashes the gunman through a window; the girl, Ella, tells him that her mother is a doctor. They rush Max to the veterinary practice where Max is operated on.

Iggy, Gazzy and Nudge are walking through a small town. Iggy has a plan to meet up with the others at Lake Mead. Gazzy realizes Nudge is gone; they find her in a clothing store but have no idea that Ari is watching them.

Max is given the all clear by the doctor, who points out a tracking chip in her shoulder and she rejoins Fang, who is angry that Max intervened but she insists it was the right thing to do. They arrive at the cabin. As they are about to kiss, they are interrupted by a sound outside and Fang covers Max's mouth. It turns out to be Iggy, Gazzy and Nudge. Max tells them about the tracking chip. They tell her about the house and about Ari. Max leaves the cabin and Ari confronts her and seems about to overpower her, but Fang starts fighting him before he and The Flock are captured.

They recover at the School, in cages, but are initially overjoyed to find Angel. Ari arrives and escorts Max to where Jeb is waiting. Max no longer trusts Jeb who tells her that she was created to help people and save the world. He shows her a hidden note and tells her that it was Ari's choice to become an Eraser. Max leaves the room and distracts Ari enough to steal his key card.

Meanwhile, one of the whitecoats is secretly reporting on Jeb to another authority. The woman says that the Flock is expendable, but dangerous, and must be controlled.

Ari returns to the cage room to taunt Max, but Max has unlocked her cage and jumps on him. She hands the key card to Iggy before Ari chases her out of the room and the Flock escapes from their cages. Ari and the Erasers corner Max, only for the Flock to arrive with a bomb made by Gazzy. Max leaps out of the way and escapes safely. Jeb arrives, calling Ari's name. The Flock stands there, watching. Jeb pleads with Max, telling her she doesn't understand but she tells him the experiments over and opens her wings.

Afterwards, the Flock walks through the woods. They pause and Max comforts Angel, only to collapse. She sees a vision of events throughout the movie, of child Ari moving to stab her with the scissors, and of New York City. When she awakens, she describes it to the Flock and they decide to go to New York City to look for more answers. The final shot is a video playing over and over again, of Max's final words to Jeb: "The experiment's over."

== Cast ==
- Allie Marie Evans as Max
- Patrick Johnson as Fang
- Lyliana Wray as Angel
- Luke Gregory Crosby as Ari
- Gavin Lewis as Gazzy
- Tetona Jackson as Nudge
- Zayne Emory as Iggy
- Carrie Wampler as Ella
- Peter O'Brien as Jeb
- Tina Huang as Dr. Rosen
- Lillie Owers as Young Max

== Production ==
In September 2007, it was announced that a film would be created based on the Maximum Ride series. James Patterson would be the executive producer. Avi Arad, who had already worked on films such as Spider-Man and X-Men, would also produce alongside Steven Paul. In an interview with James Patterson, it was revealed that Arad has already planned out the first two movies. On August 7, 2008, it was announced that Columbia Pictures had bought the screen rights to the franchise. The film was slated for a 2010 release. Catherine Hardwicke was said to direct and Don Payne would be handling the script. In January 2010 it was announced that the film would go into pre-production. Hardwicke asked for a script rewrite to include more action in the film and hired Mark Fergus and Hawk Ostby for the job, which subsequently delayed its estimated release to 2013. In February 2011, the Maximum Ride Facebook page posted, "The Maximum Ride Movie is Coming – In 3D!" and asked its Facebook fans who they would like to play Max in the movie.

The film ran into trouble in early 2012, when Catherine Hardwicke quit as the film director. When asked about the odds of a movie still being made, Patterson claimed he was "...very hopeful as opposed to mildly depressed". Trouble continued with the death of screenplay writer Don Payne on March 26, 2013.

With the film stalled by mid-2014, the series was submitted for adaptation into a web series by Collective Digital Studio. Sites attached to Patterson and Hachette claimed that the series would begin in the second half of 2015.

The completed film, starring Allie Marie Evans as Maximum Ride, was released on Digital HD on August 30, 2016.

== Reception ==
Frank Scheck of The Hollywood Reporter gave the film a negative review, writing "You've seen it before, and done a lot better." Katie Walsh of the Los Angeles Times criticized the film for its "obvious exposition, tortured dialogue and shoddy special effects".
