= Higher Ground (TV series) =

2000 Canadian TV series

- Genre: Drama
- Created by: Michael Braverman; Matthew Hastings
- Starring: Hayden Christensen; Anne Marie Loder; Joe Lando; A. J. Cook; Kandyse McClure; Jorgito Vargas, Jr. Meghan Ory; Kyle Downes; Jewel Staite; Deborah Odell
- Theme music composer: Jim Guttridge and Daryl Bennett
- Composer: Ferocious Fish
- Countries of origin: Canada; United States
- Original language: English
- No. of seasons: 1
- No. of episodes: 22

Production
- Executive producers: Frank Girusta; Harold Tichenor; Michael Braverman; Matthew Hastings; Joe Lando; Douglas Schwartz
- Producer: George Horie
- Running time: Approximately 43 minutes (per episode)
- Production companies: Crescent Entertainment; Paramount Network Television; Lions Gate Television; WIC Entertainment

Original release
- Network: Fox Family
- Release: January 14 – June 16, 2000

Higher Ground is a drama television series created by Michael Braverman and Matthew Hastings. The series follows a group of troubled and abused high school students at a therapeutic boarding school in the Pacific Northwest as they navigate adolescence in the aftermath of their home troubles.

Higher Ground first premiered in the United States on the Fox Family network on January 14, 2000. Although praised for its themes and performances (particularly Christensen's) and well-rated, the series was cancelled after its first season due to the sale of its broadcast network the following year. The show was part of a production company that did not make it to the new network.

== Synopsis ==
Located high in the mountains of the Northwestern United States and 25 miles from the nearest town, Mount Horizon High School is a harbor for at-risk teenagers from their troubled pasts. The series focuses on one group of teens, the "Cliffhangers," who, with the aid of school counselors and each other, navigate adolescence as they learn to overcome their fears and face their inner demons. Providing them with not only a standard high school education, but also a rigorous schedule of outdoor activities, counseling, and the tools they need in the aftermath of their abuse, the students work towards gaining confidence to face their personal struggles. While navigating demanding physical challenges, friendships, and romantic entanglements, the students (and some teachers) find Mount Horizon's world much safer than their turbulent home lives have been.

The students tackle issues such as substance abuse, depression, neglect, sexual, physical and verbal abuse, self-harm, eating disorders, gang violence, learning disabilities, and suicide.

== Characters ==
=== Students ===
- Scott Barringer (portrayed by Hayden Christensen)

Scott is a 16-year-old football star who plays the piano and excels in athletics. Scott is the only child of divorced parents. When Scott was 15, his father married a young woman who was closer to Scott's age. This new stepmother began sexually abusing Scott. Afraid of his father's reaction if the abuse was revealed, Scott started abusing drugs and his life fell into a downward spiral. His school work suffered and he was thrown off the football team, endangering his future as a college athlete. As a last resort, his father decided to send him to Horizon. As the "new kid" at Horizon, Scott begins to discover the stories of his classmates, as well as learn how to deal with his past.

- Shelby Merrick (portrayed by A. J. Cook)

The daughter of a neglectful and indifferent mother and sexually abusive step-father, Shelby began running away from home at the age of 15. Living on the streets and always on the run, Shelby turned to prostitution as means of survival, and began abusing drugs. Her mother eventually located her and took her home. Upon finding that she could no longer control Shelby, nor help her with her emotional problems, Shelby's mother sent her to Mount Horizon. At Horizon, Shelby has a bitter and sarcastic attitude, taking her pain out on others and creating several negative relationships with many students. As the series progresses, Shelby slowly starts opening up to Scott, Daisy, and the counselors.

- Katherine Ann "Kat" Cabot (portrayed by Kandyse McClure)

Katherine is an adopted African American child of white parents. Even though she was always aware of her adoption, a sense of alienation set in as she grew older, and Katherine felt she didn't fit in or belong. That confusion caused her grades to slip and for her to withdraw from her talents as a gifted athlete. The accidental death of Katherine's sister, Shannon, the biological daughter of her adoptive parents, traumatized her and contributed to her lapse into depression. Sent by her parents to Horizon, Katherine is the oldest of the Cliffhangers, often acting as a mother-figure and form of guidance to her younger classmates. Katherine learns that she cannot always have the Cliffhangers leaning on her for support, and that she sometimes needs to rely on others for help.

- Augusto "Auggie" Ciceros (portrayed by Jorgito Vargas Jr.)

Auggie came to Horizon to avoid a Youth Authority lockup. The youngest of five children, Auggie grew up in a middle-class home on the fringe of the barrio. Although not a gang member, he was a tagger and had gained an impressive reputation. Eventually he was busted, but the court took mercy on Auggie who, at 16, could barely read or write. All through school, he was placed in educable mentally handicapped classes despite being very intelligent. Adjudicated to Horizon, Auggie's teachers there realized the real problem: severe dyslexia. Although good-natured, Auggie often has bouts of anger and feels conflict with both himself and other students at Horizon. Auggie struggles with self-confidence, regularly believing himself to be stupid and a lost cause, and must begin to understand that his educational difficulties do not have to define who he is.

- Juliette Waybourne (portrayed by Meghan Ory)

Hiding her depression behind a cheerful façade, Juliette is often referred to as "Princess" and "Queenie" by Shelby, which is derived from her appearance and behavior, and "Twig" by the rest of the Cliffhangers, due to her weight. Juliette has bulimia and anorexia and engages in self-harm, a result of the emotional and verbal abuse she suffered as a child from her narcissistic mother. After she was sent to the hospital emergency room twice, Juliette was brought to Mount Horizon. Juliette struggles to understand that her mother's demands of "Why couldn't you be the perfect daughter?" are not her own fault.

- Ezra Friedkin (portrayed by Kyle Downes)

Ezra was adopted at birth by parents who were looking more for a solution to their marital difficulties than for a child to love. When the marriage ended in divorce, Ezra was caught in the middle of his parents' arguments. As a result, he is a people pleaser, mediator, peacemaker, and a rule-follower. To deal with the stress, Ezra began abusing ketamine, on which he nearly overdosed. After Ezra was revived in the ER and spent 10 days recovering, he was sent to Horizon. Although witty and charming, Ezra struggles with his self-confidence and emotional stability in the shadow of his parents' constant fighting.

- Daisy Lipenowski (portrayed by Jewel Staite)

Disguising herself beneath a mask of Goth makeup, dark clothing, and body piercings, and finding an interest in tarot cards and death, Daisy refers to herself as Daisy Graves. The only child of wealthy alcoholics, Daisy suffered from years of emotional abuse in her home and believed herself to be an inconvenience to her parents' addiction. When her father's abuse turned physical, Daisy assaulted him with a seven-iron golf club, and was quickly sent to Horizon. Insightful and harshly honest, Daisy hides her own inner pain, despair and rage behind arrogance and a morbid sense of humor.

=== Counselors ===
- Peter Scarbrow (portrayed by Joe Lando)

Peter has been the headmaster and chief administrator of Mt. Horizon High School for the past three years. In cooperation with the school's owner and founder, Frank Markasian, he has built Horizon into an "emotional growth" school in the Pacific Northwest. Prior to meeting Frank, Peter had bottomed-out. To keep up with the physical demands of the business after a success at one of the biggest brokerages on Wall Street, at 28 years old he turned to cocaine and then to heroin. Drugs led to divorce and when, after his first overdose and a stint at a rehabilitation clinic, he began using drugs again, Peter ended up on the streets. Recovering at a Washington hospital after another near-fatal overdose, he met Frank, whose counsel and philosophy struck a chord with Peter. The two men bonded and Frank invited him to Mount Horizon for recovery. Frank became Peter's mentor, best friend and surrogate father. Except for an occasional trip back to New York, he has remained at Mount Horizon ever since.

- Sophie Becker (portrayed by Anne Marie Loder)

Sophie met Peter Scarbrow in the hospital during one of his drug rehabilitations and the two became friends—at least one of the reasons being their interest for adrenaline sports. Sophie departed abroad seeking adventure as a way of dealing with her own unrest while Mount Horizon was established. When she returned, Peter, eager for her not to leave his life again, eventually coaxes her to become more involved at the school as teacher and counselor. Sophie agrees, taking over the position leader of the Cliffhangers, and their mutual affinity continues to deepen. During her time at Horizon, Sophie's personal struggles slowly become apparent to not only Peter, but some of the students as well.

- Hannah Bower-Barnes (portrayed by Deborah Odell)

The original leader of the Cliffhangers, Hannah loved her students dearly and became very close with them, especially Kat and Auggie. However, Hannah struggled to balance her disintegrating marriage with the emotional toll the demands of Horizon made upon her. Despite her many successes in aiding the teens, Hannah departs Horizon to mend her marriage after a devastating occurrence at the school.

=== Recurring characters ===
- Dmitry Chepovetsky as Jeff (6 episodes)
- Brittney Irvin as Jess Merrick, Shelby's younger sister (2 episodes)
- Lynda Boyd as Alice Blaine, Jess and Shelby's mother (2 episodes)
- Jim Byrnes as Frank Markasian, who founded Horizon after his son committed suicide (5 episodes)
- Sean Campbell as Sheriff Curtis Swann (7 episodes)
- Kyle Alisharan as Hank, Kat's boyfriend (5 episodes)
- Benita Ha as Annie, who owns the local restaurant and lives with her 5-year-old daughter Gracie (7 episodes)
- Garwin Sanford as Martin Barringer, Scott's father (5 episodes)
- Emmanuelle Vaugier as Elaine Barringer, Scott's sexually abusive stepmother (4 episodes)
- Terence Kelly as Don Scarbrow, Peter's father (3 episodes)
- Suzy Joachim as Juliette's abusive mother (3 episodes)
- Kett Turton as D. David Ruxton, a new member of the Cliffhangers (3 episodes)
- Ingrid Torrance as Chloë, Peter's ex-wife (4 episodes)
- Jessica Marte as Gracie (3 episodes)
- Roger Cross as Roger Claypool, a worker at Horizon who retrieves children (4 episodes)

== Episodes ==
Higher Ground consists of 22 episodes, each of which features a quotation at the beginning. These quotes come from famous writers, politicians and other significant persons.

No.	Title	Directed by	Written by	Original release date
1	"Scott Free/Pilot"	David Straiton	Michael Braverman	January 14, 2000
"We are all in the gutter, but some of us look at the stars." — Oscar Wilde Scott Barringer is brought to Mount Horizon, a school for troubled teens, against his will, while his new group, the Cliffhangers, make their way back from an eventful 10-day quest in the woods. Meanwhile, Peter Scarbrow, the administrator of Mount Horizon, learns that the school is in financial trouble and is facing foreclosure by the bank.
2	"Babe in Arms"	Alan Simmonds	John Mandel & Craig Volk	January 21, 2000
"The secret of secrets is inside me again." — Anna Akhmatova Peter is caught between his ex-wife Chloë and a new flame, Sophie Becker. The students help search for Annie's six year old daughter Gracie, who wandered off into the woods during a overnight camp-out. Shelby Merrick is acting out and must overcome the troubling shadows of her past in order to help rescue the little girl.
3	"Walking the Line"	Mick MacKay	Matthew Hastings	January 28, 2000
"If we open a quarrel between the past and the present, we shall find that we have lost the future." — Winston Churchill Peter faces his estranged father and his troubled past life in New York City to try and save Mount Horizon from foreclosure. Auggie spirals over taking the upcoming PSATs.
4	"Our Strongest Link"	Tony Westman	Bruce Miller	February 4, 2000
"All are needed by each one; Nothing is fair or good alone." — Ralph Waldo Emerson Peter drags the Cliffhangers into the X-Challenge Race when he makes a bet against the Lawrence Hastings Prep School coach. Scott refuses to be a team player, alienating him from the rest of the Cliffhangers.
5	"Hope Falls"	Michael Robison	John Mandel	March 10, 2000
"Never deprive someone of hope; It might be all they have." — H. Jackson Brown, Jr. The Cliffhangers are shaken when a new student overdoses. Frank takes the boys on a trek to the site of his son's death 22 years earlier, while Peter and the girls attempt to bake a birthday cake for Hannah.
6	"What Remains"	David Straiton	Craig Volk	February 11, 2000
"In the silence of our woods your children will not be alone." — Chief Seattle A search-and-rescue mission is mounted to find Juliette who, after falling into an uncharted cave containing Native American bones, faces her inner demons.
7	"Crossroads"	Peter DeLuise	Denitria Harris-Lawrence	February 18, 2000
"No one can make you feel inferior without your consent." — Eleanor Roosevelt Hannah's departure and Kat's impending graduation spark old emotions and rebellion. Peter assigns the Cliffhangers a parenting project taking care of eggs. Sophie returns from Nairobi.
8	"Worlds Apart"	Brenton Spencer	Denitria Harris-Lawrence	February 25, 2000
"It is easier to fight for principles than to live up to them." — Alfred Adler Auggie visits home for the first time since coming to Horizon, and his past tries to grab hold. Meanwhile, potential investors visit the school, and Sophie steps back from her relationship with Peter.
9	"Seductions"	Peter DeLuise	Jennifer Furlong	March 3, 2000
"To love oneself is the beginning of a lifelong romance." — Oscar Wilde As a thunderstorm causes the electricity to fail and the school to flood; passions run high and Shelby's attempt to seduce Scott causes him to relive unpleasant memories.
10	"Close Encounters"	Alan Simmonds	Deborah Schwartz	March 17, 2000
"Tell me who admires you and loves you, and I will tell you who you are." — C.A. Sainte-Beuve Scott runs from Horizon when his parents come to visit, trying to escape confronting his stepmother. Meanwhile, Shelby bonds with a horse that's been abused and abandoned.
11	"Best Behavior"	Alan Simmonds	John Mandel	March 31, 2000
"False face must hide what false heart doth know." — William Shakespeare Ezra's parents come for a surprise visit with disastrous consequences. Juliette is devastated when she learns that her mother is getting married again, but she's not invited.
12	"Wherefore Art Thou"	Alan Simmonds	Denitria Harris-Lawrence	April 7, 2000
"Let us not look back in anger, nor forward in fear, but around in awareness." — James Thurber The Cliffhangers deal with the fallout of Juliette and Auggie's escape and Ezra's overdose. Auggie does his best to keep Juliette safe on the streets while evading Peter and Roger's search for them.
13	"Attention Deficit"	Brenton Spencer	Craig Volk	April 14, 2000
"Somewhere in the world your Father is lost and needs you but you are far away." — William Stafford When a tough father brings his troubled son, David, to the school, the teen antagonizes the other students while his father treks through bear country with Peter.
14	"The Kids Stay in the Picture"	Mike Rohl	Matthew Hastings	April 21, 2000
"From here there is no place that does not see you. You must change your life." — Rainer Maria Rilke When Horizon's financial backers, headed by Chloë, want to film a promotional video for Mount Horizon, Peter, Sophie, and the Cliffhangers clash with the director and actors hired to portray them. Meanwhile, Scott finally tells his story to Child Protective Services.
15	"Exposed"	Alan Simmonds	Bruce Miller	April 28, 2000
"I'm giving you a longing look ... Everyday I write the book." — Elvis Costello A journalist goes undercover as a student to expose the school as a dangerous scam. The Cliffhangers are not fooled by her antics and intrusive questions and feed her the wild stories that she wants to hear. Shelby's abusive past finally comes to the surface when she gets some news from home.
16	"Innocence"	Peter DeLuise	Jennifer Furlong	May 5, 2000
"The childhood shows the man, as morning shows the day." — John Milton As an unexpected winter storm moves in, the Cliffhangers' solo treks are interrupted and Shelby becomes lost. Peter's father shows up for a surprise visit. Peter faces personal tragedy.
17	"Daised and Confused"	Matthew Hastings	Story by : Deborah Schwartz; Teleplay by : Denitria Harris-Lawrence	May 12, 2000
"I cherished hope, it is true, but it vanished when my person reflected . . ." — Mary Shelley After a devastating loss, Shelby and Sophie accompany Daisy on a road-trip back home to face her abusive, alcoholic father. At Horizon, the Cliffhangers must read Mary Shelley's "Frankenstein" and relate it to their own lives.
18	"One of Those Days"	Alan Simmonds	Jeffrey Cohen	May 19, 2000
"You don't live in a world all alone. Your brother is here too." — Albert Schweitzer Peter's brother arrives to contest their father's will; Sophie undergoes a medical procedure to deal with her health issues. Meanwhile, Shelby's mother pulls her out of Horizon to take care of her ailing, formerly abusive stepfather and Ezra steals the plot of "Romeo & Juliet" for his new play.
19	"Because It's There"	Peter DeLuise	Bruce Miller	May 26, 2000
"Why climb Mount Everest? Because it's there." — George Mallory Shelby deals with the realities of returning home and discovers a devastating revelation concerning her younger sister. The Cliffhangers worry about Shelby, but Peter doesn't have the power to bring her back to Horizon.
20	"Falling Up"	Michael Robison	Craig Volk	June 2, 2000
"Tragedies are about the depths that call up to certain men and insist that they descend." — Robert Bly Dealing with deadlines, a cold, and a relapse, Peter faces the consequences of mixing medications. Scott's biological mother visits. Horizon receives an unexpected visitor.
21	"Mended Fences"	Matthew Hastings	John Mandel	June 9, 2000
"If we really want to live, we'd better start at once to try." — Wystan Hugh Auden "Parents' Week" at Horizon causes problems for several of the Cliffhangers and Scott lies to his father about his past. Meanwhile, Shelby struggles when she finds out her younger sister has run away from home.
22	"Because I Love You"	Alan Simmonds	Michael Braverman & Jennifer Furlong	June 16, 2000
"The child shall become father to the man." — William Wordsworth Scott's father decides it is time for Scott to come home, but Scott fights his decision after reconsidering his initial enthusiasm. Katherine convinces Peter and Sophie to hold a MORP, a "backwards prom". Sophie finally confides in Peter of her personal heartache.

== Home media ==
In 2015, Higher Ground was released through both Amazon and iTunes for purchase via digital download.

== Production ==
The series was shot in Vancouver, British Columbia. Production on at the series began in July 1999. The original name of the series was Cliffhangers. By November, the film crew had only 5–6 hours of daylight each day, shifting much of the dramatic action indoors during the middle episodes.

Fox Family and Lions Gate Films took advantage of tax incentive programs offered by the Canadian and British Columbia governments to reduce costs. The programs required that the bulk of production expenses, including salaries, be spent in Canada. Because of this, though American writers wrote all 22 of the episodes, Canadians directed all the episodes, and almost all the cast and crew were Canadian.

Producers received support from other Canadian artists over the course of the series. Canadian songwriter Sarah McLachlan licensed her 1998 song “Angel” in its entirety for only C$10,000, the minimum allowable under her record company contract (the song plays at the end of Episode 2).

On May 4, 2000, producers received word that Hayden Christensen had been cast in the then-upcoming Star Wars film, Attack of the Clones (Lucasfilm made the official announcement on May 7). George Lucas became aware of Christensen when Christensen's agent sent him the pilot episode from Higher Ground. Higher Ground was cancelled after its first season due to the sale of its broadcast network the following year; the series was part of a production company that did not move to the new network.

In 2003, WAM!, the family channel of the Starz Encore network, acquired all 22 episodes of season 1 for re-airing.

== Critical reception ==
Ramin Zahed from Variety gave Higher Ground a positive review, praising its engaging drama and appealing cast. He compared the show to Dawson’s Creek, highlighting emotionally charged storytelling as young characters navigate personal struggles. The picturesque wilderness school setting adds a striking backdrop that enhances the narrative, balancing serious themes with the cast's charisma. Steve Johnson from the Chicago Tribune was more critical, describing the show as predictable and overly reliant on clichés. He calls the storytelling "creaky and obvious," and criticizes the stereotypical portrayal of an instructor who struggles with outdoor activities, suggesting that such tropes diminish the drama's impact. David Kronke from the South Florida Sun-Sentinel echoed this sentiment by focusing on the show's casting and presentation. He argued that Higher Ground relies too much on "pretty yet moody" actors, implying that the series prioritized style over substance, with the young cast appearing more suited for magazine covers than for delivering nuanced performances.
