= Daniel DeSanto =

Canadian actor

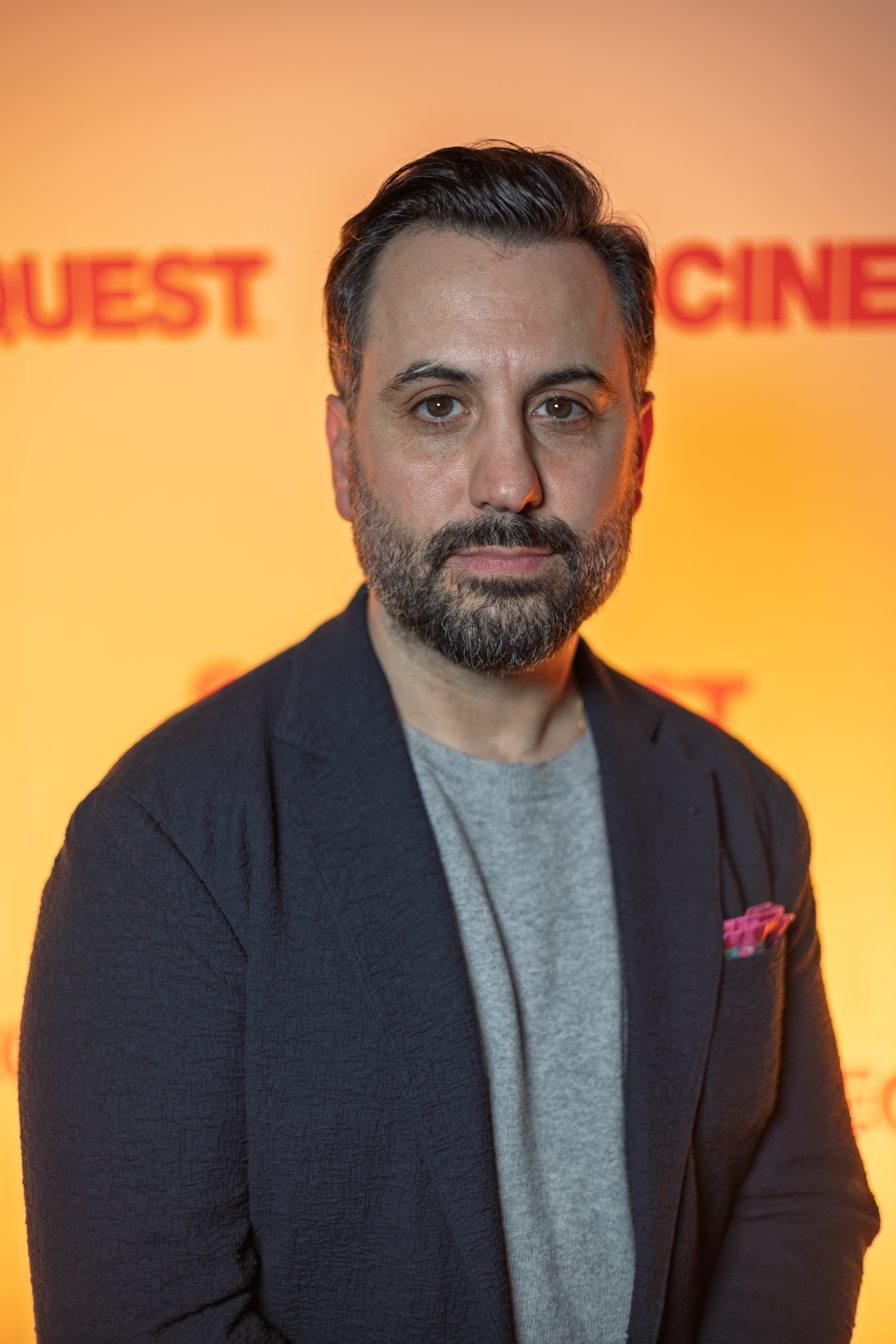
- DeSanto at the Cinequest Film Festival in 2026
- Born: 1980/1981
- Education: Martingrove Collegiate Institute
- Alma mater: Ryerson University (BA)
- Occupation: Actor
- Years active: 1989–present

Daniel DeSanto (born 1980/1981) is a Canadian actor.

== Early life ==
Raised in the Toronto suburb of Etobicoke, DeSanto made his acting debut at the age of 8 as the lead protagonist in Brown Bread Sandwiches (a.k.a. La famiglia Buonanotte), a film about Italian immigrants in Toronto written and directed by Carlo Liconti. Prior to his first screen role, DeSanto had been in a juice commercial with Canadian figure skating star Elizabeth Manley, and was an avid hockey player. He later attended Martingrove Collegiate Institute and graduated in 1999. After attending MCI, he then attended Ryerson University for film studies.

== Career ==
DeSanto is best known for playing Tucker on Are You Afraid of the Dark?, his 2004 role as Jason in Mean Girls, The Assassin in The Boondock Saints II: All Saints Day, Matt in The Adventures of Dudley the Dragon, the TV show The Magic School Bus in which he voices Carlos Ramon, and for voicing Ray on the Beyblade series and voicing Blaine on Totally Spies!. DeSanto also provided the voice of Dave in Total Drama Pahkitew Island.

== Filmography ==
Film
| Year | Title | Role | Notes |
|---|---|---|---|
| 1989 | La famiglia Buonanotte | Michaelangelo Buonanotte | |
| 1990 | The Freshman | Mall Patron | |
| 1998 | Half Baked | After School Son | |
| 2004 | Mean Girls | Jason | |
| 2009 | Gooby | Crane | |
| 2009 | The Boondock Saints II: All Saints Day | Ottilio Panza | |
| 2011 | Breakaway | Churchnick | |
| 2011 | Havana 57 | Officer Lino | |
| 2014 | Dr. Cabbie | Robin Gilbert | |
| 2017 | The Meaning of Life | Carlo | |
| 2018 | Little Italy | Anthony | |

Television
| Year | Title | Role | Notes |
|---|---|---|---|
| 1990 | Eric's World | Horace | TV series |
| 1990 | My Secret Identity | Young Kirk | Episode: "Seems Like Only Yesterday" |
| 1991 | Power Pack | Eddie | TV movie |
| 1991 | The Kids in the Hall | John; Son | Episode: "2.19"; Episode: "3.3" |
| 1991 | The Return of Elliot Ness | Newsboy #2 | TV movie |
| 1991 | Street Legal | Paley Children | Episode: "Too Many Cooks" |
| 1993 | Gregory K | Jeremiah Kingsley | TV movie |
| 1993 | Tales from the Cryptkeeper | Dwight (voice) | Episode: "While the Cat's Away" |
| 1993 | The Adventures of Dudley the Dragon | Matt | TV series |
| 1994 | Due South | Jerry | Episodes: "Chicago Holiday: Part 1" and "Chicago Holiday: Part 2" |
| 1994–1996, 1999–2000 | Are You Afraid of the Dark? | Tucker | 65 episodes |
| 1994–1997 | The Magic School Bus | Carlos Ramon (voice) | 52 episodes |
| 1995 | Prince for a Day | Carlo | TV movie |
| 1995 | Goosebumps | Gabe | Episode: "Return of the Mummy" |
| 1996–1998 | Stickin' Around | William (voice) | 39 episodes |
| 1997 | The Don's Analyst | Young Vincent | TV movie |
| 1998–1999 | The Famous Jett Jackson | Hall Beale Jr. | 3 episodes |
| 1998–1999 | Mythic Warriors | Iolas (voice) | 2 episodes |
| 1999 | Rescue Heroes | Carter (voice) | Episode: "1.27" |
| 1999-2003 | Monster by Mistake | Billy Castleman (voice) | Recurring role |
| 2000 | Wind at My Back | Boy #1 | Episode: "Coming of Age" |
| 2000 | Phantom of the Megaplex | Zeke | TV movie |
| 2001–2004 | Braceface | Brock Leighton | Main Role |
| 2001–2009 | Arthur | Alberto Molina | 4 episodes |
| 2002–2005 | Beyblade | Ray Kon | Main Role |
| 2003 | Moville Mysteries | Dominic Esquito (voice) | Episode: "The Night and Day and Night of the Hunter" |
| 2004 | Beyblade: Fierce Battle | Ray (voice) | Video |
| 2004–2005 | Da Boom Crew | Additional voice | |
| 2005 | Time Warp Trio | Temujin (voice) | Episode: "You Can't, but Genghis Khan" |
| 2006, 2008, 2010 | Totally Spies! | Blaine (voice) | 6 episodes |
| 2008 | The Border | Rene Colone | Episode: "Normalizing Relations" |
| 2008 | XIII | T.A. | TV miniseries |
| 2009 | Being Erica | Lance | Episode: "What I Am Is What I Am" |
| 2009 | Deadliest Sea | Greenhorn | TV movie |
| 2009 | Aaron Stone | Harrison | 4 episodes |
| 2010 | Bloodletting & Miraculous Cures | Steven Dizon | Episode: "Code Clock" |
| 2010 | The Dating Guy | Whitebread (voice) | Episode: "20,000 VJs Under the Sea" |
| 2011 | Mudpit | T.L. | Episode: "First Temptation of Mudpit" |
| 2011 | Combat Hospital | Major Glad Marin | 6 episodes |
| 2012 | Whiskey Business | Joey Pipes | TV movie |
| 2012 | Republic of Doyle | Marco | Episode: "Con, Steal, Love" |
| 2012 | Rookie Blue | Paul Salenko | Episode: "Girls' Night Out" |
| 2013 | Lost Girl | Aussie | Episode: "SubterrFaenean" |
| 2014 | Total Drama Pahkitew Island | Dave | 10 episodes |
| 2015 | Charming Christmas | Vince | TV movie |
| 2016 | Murdoch Mysteries | Alan Driscoll | Episode: "A Case of the Yips" |
| 2016–2018 | PAW Patrol | Daring Danny X (voice) | Recurring role |
| 2017 | Preshift | Casting director | Episode: "Re-writes" |
| 2017 | Man Seeking Woman | Mr. Martinez | Episode: "Bagel" |
| 2017 | The Indian Detective | Todd Johnson | 4 episodes |
| 2018 | Dot. | Rick/Ro-Bo-BQ (voice) | Episode: "Dot's Birthday Wishlist" |
| 2018 | Wholesome Foods I Love You... Is That OK? | Marko | Lead role |
| 2018 | Imposters | Office Manager | Episode: "Fillion Bollar King" |
| 2020 | Mayday | Captain | Episode: "Impossible Pitch" |
| 2022 | Workin' Moms | Reggie | 2 episodes |
