= Lyliana Wray =

American actress

- Born: December 30, 2004 (age 21)
- Occupation: Actor
- Years active: 2015–present

Lyliana Wray (born December 30, 2004) is an American actress who began her career with Marvista's 2015 film Girl Missing and has since gone on to appear in Paramount's 2016 film Maximum Ride, ABC's Strange Angel, NBC's The Night Shift, Nickelodeon's 2019 revival of Are You Afraid of the Dark? and Paramount's 2022 release of Top Gun: Maverick.

== Career ==
She appeared in Joel Soisson's Girl Missing. In 2016, Wray appeared in Paramount's release of James Patterson's Maximum Ride. That same year, Albedo Absolute, a short-film directed by Vlad Marsavin, was released. In 2017, Wray appeared in Gabe Sachs and Jeff Judah's The Night Shift. The following year, Lyliana was cast in the Black-ish season four episode "North Star," appeared as young Susan in three episodes of the television series Strange Angel and was cast in the lead role of Rachel Carpenter in Nickelodeon's revival of Are You Afraid of the Dark?. Wray appears in Joe Kosinski's Top Gun: Maverick in the role of Amelia Benjamin.

== Filmography ==
=== Film ===
Year	Title	Role	Notes
2016	Maximum Ride	Angel	Film
2022	Top Gun: Maverick	Amelia Benjamin	Film

=== Television ===
Year	Title	Role	Notes
2015	Girl Missing	Savannah Knowles	Television film
2017	The Night Shift	Naya	Episode: "Family Matters"
2018	Strange Angel	Young Susan	3 episodes
2018	Black-ish	Riley	Episode: "North Star"
2019	Are You Afraid of the Dark?: The Midnight Society	Rachel Carpenter	Main role

=== Short film ===
Year	Title	Role	Notes
2016	Albedo Absolute	Violet	
