= Eric's World =

- Genre: Comedy
- Created by: Bruce Glawson; Eric Nagler; John Pattison; Robert Sandler; Arnie Zipursky
- Starring: Ashley Brown; Eric Nagler; Daniel DeSanto; Michelyn Emelle; John Pattison
- Opening theme: "Come On In!" by Eric Nagler
- Country of origin: Canada
- Original language: English
- No. of seasons: 5
- No. of episodes: 65

Production
- Production locations: Toronto, Ontario, Canada
- Running time: 25 minutes
- Production company: Cambium Productions

Original release
- Network: TVOntario; Family Channel
- Release: January 1, 1991 – 1995

Eric's World is a children's sitcom, which aired on a number of Canadian networks in 1991–1995, and was produced by Cambium Productions, running for five seasons.

The show starred Eric Nagler, who had previously appeared on Sharon, Lois & Bram's Elephant Show. The show also featured Ashley Brown as Max, Michelyn Emelle as Andrea, Daniel DeSanto as Horace, Niki Holt as Kaley, Maggie Huculak as Marian the Librarian, Nicole Lyn as Prue and John Pattison as C.J..

== Premise ==
Eric lives in a trailer park with his daughter Kaley, and later with his adopted son Nat. As a single parent, Eric has the help and support of friends and neighbours like Andrea and her son Max, and the very knowledgeable adventurer Marion the Librarian. All of the children had best friends, for example, Kaley's best friend was Prue. In the series, there is also a life sized puppet named C.J. who serves as Eric's manager.

== Cast ==
- Eric Nagler As Himself
- Niki Holt as Kaley
- Nicole Lyn as Prue
- Ashley Brown as Max
- Michelyn Emelle as Andrea
- Maggie Huculak as Marion
- John Pattison as the voice and puppeteer of CJ
- Daniel DeSanto as Horace
- Kenny Vadas as Nat
