= Ross Hull =

Canadian actor and television personality

- Born: August 25, 1975 (age 51); Montreal, Quebec, Canada
- Education: Mississippi State University (CBM); Ryerson University (BA)
- Occupations: Actor; television personality; weather anchor
- Years active: 1987–present

Ross Hull (born August 25, 1975) is a Canadian actor, meteorologist, and television personality. He is known for his roles as Chris Sheppard on Canadian sitcom Student Bodies and as Gary, the leader of the Midnight Society, on the television series Are You Afraid of the Dark?.

== Early life and acting career ==
Born in Montreal, Quebec, Hull began his acting career in 1987 with the film Nowhere to Hide. Hull also appeared in other shows, including Ready or Not and Are You Afraid of the Dark?, and then landed the role of Chris Sheppard in Student Bodies. He made an appearance on Stargate Atlantis in the episode Suspicion.

== Weather anchor career ==
In January 2005, Hull became a weather personality on Canada's The Weather Network, after completing the Certified Broadcast Meteorologist program at Mississippi State University and graduating with a bachelor's degree in radio and television arts from Ryerson University in Toronto.

In April 2007, Ross became a temporary reporter for the Vancouver area, replacing Oga Nwobosi while she was on maternity leave.

On December 15, 2008, Hull left The Weather Network and became a reporter for Citytv Calgary.

On September 8, 2010, Hull became the weather anchor for A London, in London, Ontario, where he forecasted the weather for London and the entire region of Southwestern Ontario.

In June 2011, Hull became a weather anchor for CTV Kitchener.

In early 2013, he appeared as the weather anchor for CBC Ottawa and CBC News Network. He subsequently became weather anchor for CBC Toronto until the end of June 2014. He was then a meteorologist with Global Toronto.

Currently, Ross Hull is a multi-market meteorologist for Global News. He works in Toronto but produces forecasts for Toronto, Montreal, Halifax, and New Brunswick on weekdays with the addition of Winnipeg, Regina, and Saskatoon on the weekends.

== Personal life ==
Ross is openly gay. He explains, "As for being 'out,' I think that's all a part of being comfortable with who you are and that ultimately helps you in all aspects of life. It's not always easy to get to that point though, which is why a supportive community always helps as well as knowing that others have taken that path (with success) before you."

== Filmography ==
Film and television roles
Year	Title	Role	Notes
1987	Nowhere to Hide	Tory Bollinger	
1988	Malarek	Young Victor Malarek	
1990	Eric's World	Jeff	TV series
1991	Haute Tension	Jimmy	Episode: "Frontière du crime"
1992–1996; 2000	Are You Afraid of the Dark?	Gary	68 episodes
1994	The Mighty Jungle	Chester	Episode: "Take My Daddy, Please"
1994–1995	Ready or Not	Danny Masters	4 episodes
1995	Iron Eagle IV	Malcolm Porter	
1996	Beyond the Call	Teen Dwayne	TV movie
1996	Swiss Family Robinson		Video movie
1997	Due South	Keith Warren	Episode: "Seeing Is Believing"
1997–2000	Student Bodies	Chris Sheppard	65 episodes
1999	Fearless		TV movie
2001	Mutant X	Daniel Benedict	Episode: "Russian Roulette"
2004	Stargate: Atlantis	Dr. Corrigan	Episode: "Suspicion"
