= Are You Afraid of the Dark? =

Horror anthology television series

- Genre: Horror; Fantasy; Drama; Anthology
- Created by: D. J. MacHale; Ned Kandel
- Starring: (See list of cast)
- Theme music composer: Jeff Zahn; Jeff Fisher
- Ending theme: "Welcome to the Carnival" by Lilou Bouhier (2019)
- Countries of origin: Canada; United States
- Original language: English
- No. of seasons: 10
- No. of episodes: 104 (list of episodes)

Production
- Executive producers: D. J. MacHale; Micheline Charest (1991–2000); Ned Kandel (1991, 1999-2000, 2019–2022); Matt Kaplan (2019–2022); Spencer Berman (2019–2021); BenDavid Grabinski (2019); Dean Israelite (2019, 2022); Chris Foss (2019, 2022); Jeff Wadlow (2021); JT Billings (2021–2022)
- Camera setup: Single-camera
- Running time: 22–25 minutes (1991–2000); 44–45 minutes (2019–2022)
- Production companies: Nickelodeon Productions; CINAR (Note: As Campfire Productions Inc.) (1992–2000); WildBrain (2019–2022) (Note: Known as DHX Media for the first season.); ACE Entertainment (2019–2022); Yesteryear (2022)

Original release
- Network: YTV (Canada); Family Channel (Canada); Nickelodeon (United States)
- Release: October 25, 1991 (pilot)
- Release: August 15, 1992 – February 3, 1996
- Release: February 6, 1999 – June 11, 2000
- Release: October 11, 2019 – August 13, 2022

Are You Afraid of the Dark? is a Canadian-American children's horror anthology television series created by D. J. MacHale and Ned Kandel. The original series aired on Nickelodeon in the United States from August 15, 1992, to February 3, 1996, and also on YTV in Canada. The pilot episode first aired as a Halloween special on October 25, 1991. It led to two revival series, with the first airing from February 6, 1999, to June 11, 2000, and the second airing from October 11, 2019, to August 13, 2022. Reruns would continue to air until October 31, 2002. Later, Nicktoons would air reruns of Are You Afraid of the Dark? from October 20 to 31, 2008.

The original series was picked up by Nickelodeon in 1992. MacHale, Kandel, and Nickelodeon teamed up with the Canadian company CINAR, and as a part of the deal the show was filmed primarily in Montreal, Quebec, with some additional filming taking place in Richmond, British Columbia. The production teams were respectively represented by the ACTRA and STCVQ (Syndicat des techniciens du cinéma et de la vidéo du Québec) labour unions. (Note: These unions are mentioned during the end credits of each episode in the original series. In 2004, the STCVQ and APVQ (Association des professionnels de la vidéo du Québec), another Quebec union, merged to form the AQTIS (Alliance québécoise des techniciens et techniciennes de l'image et du son or Alliance of Image and Sound Technicians).) The pilot re-aired five days after its debut alongside Mystery Magical Special as part of a Halloween-oriented block called "The Haunting of Nickelodeon". It officially premiered as a series the following year on Nickelodeon's SNICK on August 15, 1992, and on Family Channel on September 2, 1992. The series moved from Family Channel to YTV on September 6, 1993. The original series ended on February 3, 1996.

In 1999, Are You Afraid of the Dark? was revived for two more seasons, bringing back a majority of the crew members who worked on the original series along with new directors, writers and cast, and was produced by Nickelodeon and aired on the SNICK block from February 6, 1999, to June 11, 2000, while in Canada the series was moved to the Family Channel, as YTV owned the rights to the original series. The only member from the original lineup to return for the first and second seasons of the revival was Tucker (Daniel DeSanto), although Gary (Ross Hull) returned for the concluding show.

On November 13, 2017, it was announced that Paramount Players would make a live-action feature film adaptation. However, the film was later removed from Paramount's schedule. On February 14, 2019, it was announced that the series would be rebooted for a limited series, which premiered on October 11, 2019. On February 19, 2020, this revival was renewed for a second season, titled Are You Afraid of the Dark?: Curse of the Shadows, which premiered on February 12, 2021, featuring a different cast. In March 2022, the revival was renewed for a third and final season, which premiered on July 30, 2022.

== Background ==
Are You Afraid of the Dark? was filmed in Montreal by CINAR and created by producer D. J. MacHale, an American television producer. The show is a co-production between Montreal-based CINAR Films and the U.S. Nickelodeon network. It had its American debut on Nickelodeon in the United States during August, while Canada's Family Channel had the series premiere in September 1992. By 1993, the series had moved from Family Channel to YTV.

== Themes ==
Are You Afraid of the Dark? is a children's horror anthology series revolving around the Midnight Society, a group of kids who meet around a campfire and tell a horror story. Its style has been compared to Dark Shadows, The Monkey’s Paw, The Twilight Zone, and works from Stephen King and George Orwell. A low-budget series, it is known for its use of practical effects. Every episode is set at a secret location in the woods at night, one member of the Midnight Society would tell a scary story to the group. The actual story, rather than the telling, was displayed to the television viewer. The story was shown between the group's arrival at the site and their departure.

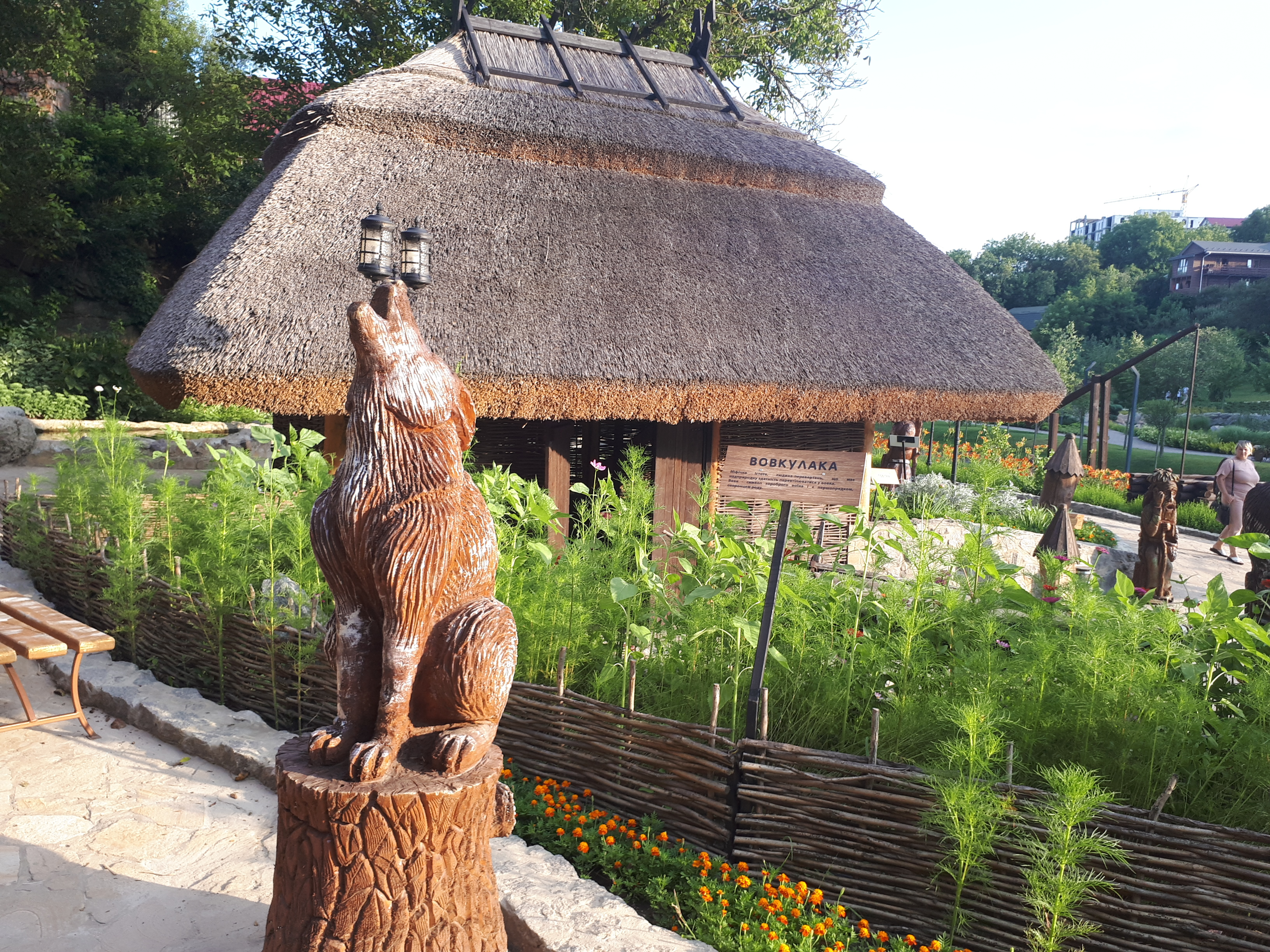
Werewolves are a common trope of the series

Each storyteller would begin their story by saying "Submitted for the approval of the Midnight Society, I call this story '(story name)'", at which point they would toss a handful of "midnight dust" (actually Coffee-Mate) from a leather pouch into a campfire to heighten the flames and produce an eerie white smoke.

MacHale wrote the line "submitted for the approval of" as a nod to The Twilight Zone, in which creator Rod Serling would, after introducing the episode, say "submitted for your approval." The storyteller would continue by announcing its title ("The Tale of..."). The themes of the stories usually revolve around a variety of paranormal phenomena, such as demons, ghosts, magic, haunted houses, magical curses, aliens, witches, vampires, werewolves, and the like coming into contact with average youths. Usually, the episodes were either filmed in the woods, in abandoned houses, or in public places like schools or libraries. Sources of these tales vary in different ways; many were adaptations of public domain fairy tales and short stories or urban legends. For example, the episode "The Tale of the Twisted Claw" is an adaptation of W. W. Jacobs' short story The Monkey's Paw.

Sometimes, the stories were inspired by a certain event in the life of the storyteller. In the episode "The Tale of the Crimson Clown," for instance, Tucker blackmailed with a love poem written for Samantha, prompting Gary to tell a cautionary tale about a naughty younger brother who is cruelly punished by a sinister toy clown for his misdeeds. At the end of the episode, Tucker gave the poem back to his brother. Similarly, in "The Tale of the Renegade Virus," Gary frames his story around a destructive entity invading a human host after arriving late to the clearing because Tucker planted a computer virus that deleted his homework. These framing narratives often conclude with a real-world resolution among the members once the campfire is extinguished. The majority of the horror stories on Are You Afraid of the Dark? had happy endings (or at least endings in which their characters were in decent places), while some had either bad endings or twist endings like "The Tale of the Lonely Ghost," "The Tale of the Dark Music," "The Tale of the Chameleons," "The Tale of Vampire Town," "The Tale of the Pinball Wizard" and "The Tale of the Dangerous Soup."

At the end of most episodes, one character (usually Gary in the first run and Tucker in the second run of the show) would throw a red bucket of water onto the fire, stating, "I declare this meeting of the Midnight Society closed," and the group would leave the campsite, thus ending the storytelling. Sometimes, the story would be related to an event (e.g. in "The Tale of Laughing in the Dark," Kristen, who was afraid of clowns, ran off when Eric put on a clown mask. Then, everyone chased after her). This would cause either Gary or Tucker to hurriedly dump the water on the fire, and the Midnight Society would run off to wherever they go after meetings.

== Episodes ==
Season	Episodes	Originally released		
Season	Episodes	First released	Last released	Network
Pilot (1991)
Pilot		October 25, 1991		Nickelodeon
Original series (1992–1996)
1	13	August 15, 1992	November 14, 1992	Nickelodeon; Family Channel; YTV
2	13	June 19, 1993	October 2, 1993	Nickelodeon; Family Channel; YTV
3	13	January 8, 1994	April 16, 1994	Nickelodeon; Family Channel; YTV
4	13	October 1, 1994	January 21, 1995	Nickelodeon; Family Channel; YTV
5	13	October 7, 1995	February 3, 1996	Nickelodeon; Family Channel; YTV
1999 revival (1999–2000)
6	13	February 6, 1999	May 15, 1999	Nickelodeon; Family Channel
7	13	April 2, 2000	June 11, 2000	Nickelodeon; Family Channel
2019 reboot (2019–2022)
Carnival of Doom	3	October 11, 2019	October 25, 2019	Nickelodeon
Curse of the Shadows	6	February 12, 2021	March 19, 2021	Nickelodeon
Ghost Island	4	July 30, 2022	August 13, 2022	Nickelodeon

== Characters and cast ==
Each member of the Midnight Society from 1992 to 1996 has a distinct personality, and a notable trend in their storytelling. Though not all of their stories have similar styles and plots, in many of the stories, each character carries a unique aspect that reflects the nature of the storyteller, and what they find to be the most important to themselves. In the second generation, the characters derive their stories more from events that happen during the days leading up to the society meetings instead of from their personal interests and views. Many of the later episodes were simply given to a random society member to tell.

Role	Actor/Actress	Year(s)	Notes
The Midnight Society (1992–1996)
Gary	Ross Hull	1992–1996	Originally played by Shane Smythe in the 1991 pilot. Appeared in "The Tale of the Silver Sight", 3 episodes, in 2000.
Betty Ann	Raine Pare-Coull	1992–1996	Originally played by Marisa Rossy in the 1991 pilot.
Kiki	Jodie Resther	1992–1996	Originally played by Bethanny Nurse in the 1991 pilot.
Frank Moore	Jason Alisharan	1992–1995	Originally played by Hasani Paris-Crooks in the 1991 pilot.
Tucker	Daniel DeSanto	1994–1996	
Samantha	JoAnna Garcia	1994–1996	
Kristen	Rachel Blanchard	1992–1993	Originally played by Robin McKenna in the 1991 pilot.
David	Nathaniel Moreau	1992–1993	Originally played by Ross Hull in the 1991 pilot.
Stig	Codie Wilbee	1995–1996	
Eric	Jacob Tierney	1992	Originally played by Mark Bigney in the 1991 pilot.
The Midnight Society (1999–2000)
Quinn	Kareem Blackwell	1999–2000	
Megan	Elisha Cuthbert	1999–2000	
Vange	Vanessa Lengies	1999–2000	
Tucker	Daniel DeSanto	1999–2000	DeSanto reprises his role from the 1992–1996 series.
Andy	David Deveau	1999–2000	
The Midnight Society (2019)
Rachel Carpenter	Lyliana Wray	2019	
Gavin Coscarelli	Sam Ashe Arnold	2019	
Akiko Yamato	Miya Cech	2019	
Graham Raimi	Jeremy Ray Taylor	2019	
Louise Fulci	Tamara Smart	2019	
The Midnight Society (2021)
Luke McCoy	Bryce Gheisar	2021	
Hanna Romero	Beatrice Kitsos	2021	
Gabby Lewis	Malia Baker	2021	
Jai Malya	Arjun Athalye	2021	
Seth Romero	Dominic Mariche	2021	
Connor Stevens	Parker Queenan	2021	
The Midnight Society (2022)
Kayla King	Telci Huynh	2022	
Max Matheson	Conor Sherry	2022	
Leo B. Stoker	Luca Padovan	2022	
Summer DaCosta	Dior Goodjohn	2022	
Porter	Ashby Gentry	2022	
Ferris Poe	Chance Hurstfield	2022	

=== Original ===
- Gary: An unassuming, bookish-looking boy and the founder of this generation of the Midnight Society. Gary has a distinct fascination with magic, especially where the magician Houdini is concerned. His stories tend to revolve around cursed or enchanted objects with supernatural properties, and how – in the wrong hands – they can cause disaster, for both the holder and those around them. His stories have the recurring character "Sardo" in them; most of his stories have the main character buying an enchanted item from Sardo's shop. In the 3-part episode, "The Tale of the Silver Sight", Gary reveals that his grandfather was the founder of the Midnight Society and that it was his grandfather's stories that inspired him to recreate the group.
- Betty Ann: A vibrant girl who has an open and eager passion for the bizarre and twisted. Her stories often include themes where an alien or supernatural force is either trying to break into the world of the characters, or else trying to drag them into their own unnatural realms. Her stories tend to have twists reminiscent of Twilight Zone episodes, hinting that even after the protagonists of her stories manage to defeat the antagonists, they have yet to fully escape danger by the end.
- Kiki: A spunky, tomboyish girl who often makes fun of others. Many of her stories involve plots where the danger of carelessness or deceitfulness, as well as the danger of the past, repeats itself. Also notable is that a large number of the characters in her stories are also of African descent (likely due to Kiki herself being African-Canadian), though the trend dies off later on in the series. One story she came up with had to be read by Gary due to her suffering from laryngitis at the time.
- Frank: A punkish teenager with an in-your-face attitude. Though his stories do not often have a running theme, they do often have the recurring character Dr. Vink appear as the villain, or at least, the creator of the story's antagonist. The first episode of the series has Frank attempting to impress the Midnight Society with a story to be allowed membership, which he does with "The Tale of the Phantom Cab". In season five, he and his family moved away, and he was replaced in the group by Stig.
- Tucker: Gary's younger brother and the youngest member of the Midnight Society. Due to his age, he is often portrayed as youthfully obnoxious. His stories tend to involve family relationships that are at first sour but grow in strength in the face of adversity, possibly reflecting his relationship with his brother Gary. There is also a running theme of the characters accidentally unleashing evil upon their world. After Gary left, he took over his place as the president of the Midnight Society. Once Tucker is in charge, he is less of a brat and more of a serious leader like his older brother. He is the only character to appear in both generations of the Midnight Society.
- Sam: A shy girl with an obvious mutual crush on Gary, which becomes one of the highlighted arcs of both their developments in the series. Reflecting this affection for Gary, Sam's stories tend to have more of a strong theme of love, and its endurance even beyond death.
- Kristen: A girl who, though squeamish about much else, has a fondness for ghost stories and fairy tales. She has a growing crush on David, and their affection for each other is a developing arc in the first few seasons. She loves to dress up for her stories or bring something for effect, sometimes to scare the others with and her stories almost always deal with ghosts from the past who have unfinished business that they cannot complete without the aid of the living. In season 3, she left the Midnight Society due to her and her family moving, and she was replaced in the group by Sam.
- David: A quiet boy with a mysterious expression. Reflecting his introverted nature and need to deal with his crush on Kristen, David's stories tend to be less about malignant outside forces, and more to do with the evil of past events left unresolved, or the darkness inside normal people, and the consequences of not dealing with their actions. In season 3, he and his family moved away, and he was replaced in the group by Tucker.
- Stig: His nickname may come from the term stigma, as he is marked an outsider for his notable lack of hygiene. Stig is the last member to be initiated into this generation of the Midnight Society. As such, he has only two stories in the series before the cast is changed: "The Tale of the Dead Man's Float" and "The Tale of Station 109.1." Due to the aversion people seem to have against him for his looks, both of his stories seem to revolve around outsiders judged for their appearances and/or tastes.
- Eric: Eric is portrayed as a diminutive teenager with visible Irish ancestry that influences his first story. As he has only had two stories in the first season before his character was cut, there is no visible theme in his storytelling but they seem to be about incredibly powerful evil forces (ones never proven innocent or misunderstood like some others). In his short run on the show, Eric was shown to be rather snide and negative, spending most of the time making sarcastic remarks and antagonizing the other members, especially Frank. He is the only character to leave the show without any explanation for his departure.

=== Revival ===
Several years after the last meeting of the Midnight Society, Tucker returns to reinitialize the meetings, inviting his own circle of friends to reform the Midnight Society.

- Quinn: is usually getting in trouble at school and at home, but he is a smart kid that likes to make fun of Andy teamed up with Vange. Quinn's stories have little in common though usually involve the protagonists' actions unleashing or bringing them face-to-face with the villain.
- Vange: (short for "Evangeline") is the youngest of the New Midnight Society. She is a tomboy and does not have a problem with speaking her mind. Teamed up with Quinn she makes fun of Andy a lot. Vange's stories have little in common though most seem to be about how wanting something too badly can cause the main character to play into the villain's hands.
- Andy: is very sweet and kind. He is always being made fun of by Quinn and Vange for having more muscle than brains. He lives on a farm with his family. He often works there before and after school. Andy is the closest to Megan. Andy's stories have little in common but are often about how characters' dark sides can unleash evil. Usually, the inspiration for his stories are based on his own real-life personal experiences.
- Megan: is a rich kid who is not very comfortable in the woods. She would rather hold the New Midnight Society Meetings in her own well-managed backyard. Tucker, not being the stickler his brother was, lets Megan refurnish the campfire with some comfortable old couches. She seems to have a soft spot for Andy. Megan's stories have little in common though most seem to somehow involve romance. Sometimes she brings a prop or starts a brief game relating to her story.

=== Reboot ===
In 2019, a second revival of the show began. The first season is known as "Carnival of Doom", the second season is known as "Curse of the Shadows" and the third season is known as "Ghost Island".

==== Carnival of Doom ====
The Midnight Society:

- Rachel Carpenter: A shy girl who recently moved to the town of Argento. She quickly resigns herself to life as a social outsider, but when some classmates notice her interest in the horror genre, she earns an invite to the mysterious Midnight Society. She suffers from recurring nightmares and uses that to form her first story to submit to the group, The Carnival of Doom. She is named after John Carpenter.
- Gavin Coscarelli: An outgoing vegetarian member who lives next door to Rachel and quickly takes an interest in her. He is good friends with Louise and is shown to be fairly popular at school. He is named after Don Coscarelli.
- Akiko Yamato: A blunt and pragmatic member of the Midnight Society who enjoys filmmaking and is seen directing her own scary movie throughout the series. Her older brother, Hideo, is a rookie police officer.
- Graham Raimi: A horror film fanatic who loves gushing about his favorite movies, although he often comes off awkward to his peers. He is also a talented artist and a germaphobe. He sits behind Rachel in class and is the first to pick up on Rachel's horror obsession, eventually inviting her to the group. He is named after Sam Raimi.
- Louise Fulci: A cheerleader and one of the popular girls at school who holds her reputation dearly. Although she is friends with Gavin, she avoids speaking to the other members of the Midnight Society outside of meetings, particularly Graham, in fear that it will affect her social status. She is named after Lucio Fulci.

==== Curse of the Shadows ====
The Midnight Society:

- Luke McCoy: A skateboarding Shadow Bay High School wrestler who snuck out after a fight.
- Hanna Romero
- Gabby Lewis
- Jai Malya
- Seth Romero: Hanna's young brother with an interest in wizardry.
- Connor Stevens

==== Ghost Island ====
The Midnight Society:

- Kayla King
- Max Matheson
- Leo B. Stoker
- Summer DaCosta
- Ferris Poe

=== Recurring characters ===
One of the more significant recurring characters was Sardo (Richard Dumont), owner of "Sardo's Magic Mansion" (a magic shop). He would often attempt to sell a character a "prized" item, succeeding almost every single time. He often had items in his shop that contained real properties of magic, yet did not know until it was revealed in the story. One of the most memorable recurring jokes in the series occurred when someone would address him as "Mr. Sardo." He would then get irritated and exclaim: "That's SarDO (Sardôh)! No mister; accent on the doh!"

Another recurring gag is Sardo attempting to sell a series of cheap novelty items before revealing the magical artifact, culminating with fake vomit, asking the protagonists, "Have you seen our vomit?" Additionally, when selling someone an item, he would often ask a rather high price. The main character would mention how much money they had, and Sardo would grab the money saying, "But I'm losing on the deal." Although he rarely got what he wanted, he would often end up helping the characters, often unintentionally. He appeared in Gary's stories, although in the later seasons, he appeared in two of Tucker's, and one of David's in the episode "The Tale of The Dark Dragon."

Sardo's character is revived in the second season of the second revival, "Curse of the Shadows." Sardo's son (Ryan Beil) is the owner of "Sardo's Magic Shop". Richard Dumont appears in the finale as Sardo.

Another recurring character was Dr. Vink (Aron Tager). He was a physically imposing man who would often appear as a mad scientist, sorcerer, and the like. When he enters, he introduces himself by saying, "Vink's the name. Dr. Vink." He would also get his name mispronounced, usually something like "Dr. Fink?" When this happened, he would respond "Vink. With a va-va-va!" Often, the protagonist would call him a "nutbag" behind his back, assuming he could not hear him, only to have him reply later, "...and I am not a nutbag".

Unlike Sardo, whose character was set in a magic shop, Dr. Vink had many "unique endeavors" as he called them, for his stories. These ranged from living deep in the woods conducting strange nature experiments, being a retired filmmaker, owning his own restaurant as head chef and lastly a barbershop. His activities were usually villainous, designed to put the characters in peril and allow him the last laugh. However, in his last appearance, "The Tale of Cutter's Treasure" (which was told by both Frank and Gary), he allied himself with Sardo and the main characters without his usual maliciousness. He appeared in Frank's stories. Aron Tager also played the carnival worker who stands in front of the Funhouse and invites people to go inside in the episode "The Tale of the Laughing in the Dark".

The character of Zeebo the Clown, also played by Tager, who appeared in "The Tale of the Laughing in the Dark" is referenced in several other stories, for example, in the episode "The Tale of the Whispering Walls", two children mention seeing him at a fun park, in the episode "The Tale of the Mystical Mirror", a girl says she will look like Zeebo if she wears too much lipstick, and in the episode "The Tale of the Crimson Clown", a video game called Zeebo's Big House can be seen in the boys' room on the desk with a picture of Zeebo on it as the title character. The video game was also mentioned in the episode "The Tale of Train Magic". Finally, in the episode "The Tale of the Night Shift", the teenage janitor is called Zeebo by his supervisor a few times at the beginning of the episode.

A villain, the "Ghastly Grinner" (star of "The Tale of the Ghastly Grinner"), like Zeebo the Clown, appears in a comic book that the characters read. In "Tale of the Ghastly Grinner", The Grinner is shown as being the star of a comic book.

== Legacy ==
The show became a weekly staple for children and tweens in the 1990s. Kids "were old enough to stay up but not old enough to stay out, so [they] spent nearly every Saturday night huddled around television sets with friends or siblings, pretending not to be terrified by that week's tale." As written by Matt Melis,

"But there's also a lot to admire in the care that went into trying to frighten us. We saw the protagonists encountering the creepy and supernatural in the same suburban settings we hailed from. They were remarkably vulnerable and insecure kids, too, ones with problems we could relate to; they were new kids, outcasts, rival siblings, and children experiencing rough patches like deaths in the family or parents filing for divorce."

Writing for the The A.V. Club, Michelle Welch described the series's legacy as "admirable" for its ability to scare children without condescending to them.

Series co-creator D.J. MacHale said, "I wanted stories about real kids who were facing challenges that had nothing to do with the supernatural situation they ended up in." He added, "But I'd like to believe that by depicting kids taking charge of difficult situations, it opened up kid-viewers to the idea that they aren't powerless in their own lives." The show has also been hailed for its diversity in characters and stories. "I write about kids who find themselves in challenging situations, and ultimately solve the problems themselves... no matter their sex, race, or age. We wanted to depict a wide variety of stories, characters, and situations. It was all about diversity," says MacHale. "We didn't play to stereotypes." The series was nominated for an NAACP Image Award in 1996. The show has also been seen as helping to create a generation of feminist horror fans, as it showed kids a world "where girls got to be the imperfect heroes as often as the boys did." According to MacHale, "in the first season alone, half of the scripts focused on female characters and were written by female writers."

=== Notable episodes ===
Several episodes of Are You Afraid of the Dark? have been singled out and praised by publications. The episode "The Tale of Laughing in the Dark" has been praised for its carnival aesthetic and its villain, Zeebo. "The Tale of the Ghastly Grinner" is credited for its range of storytelling elements and scariness. Similarly, "The Dead Man's Float" is singled out for its scariness along with its use of jump scares.

== Home media ==
=== VHS releases ===
Three VHS tapes were released by Sony Wonder. Ghostly Tales, which included the episodes "The Tale of the Shiny Red Bicycle" and "The Tale of the Frozen Ghost" plus a bonus "Feel the Fear" music video, was released on March 22, 1994; Nightmare Tales, which included the episodes "The Tale of the Final Wish" and "The Tale of the Dream Machine", was released on May 31, 1994; and The Tale of Cutter's Treasure which included the two part tale and as a bonus a behind-the-scenes look of "The Tale of Cutter's Treasure", was released on June 13, 1995.

In addition, episodes of the series were included on two compilation tapes of SNICK programming, both of which were released on August 31, 1993; "The Tale of the Lonely Ghost" was included on Nick Snicks Friendship, and "The Tale of the Hungry Hounds" was included on Nick Snicks the Family.

=== DVD releases ===
Direct Source Special Products, under license from Cookie Jar Entertainment, released all seven seasons of Are You Afraid of the Dark? on DVD in Region 1 for the first time between 2006 and 2008. These releases featured group shots of the Midnight Society on the front. The first five seasons were released in Canada and the United States, while seasons 6 and 7 of the revival series were released in Canada only. The company also released a joint collection of seasons 1–2 and seasons 3–4 as a box set. These releases have been discontinued and are now out-of-print.

On April 8, 2013, it was announced that Berkshire Axis Media had acquired the rights to the series in Canada only and would be re-releasing it. Season 1 was re-released on May 28, 2013, and season 2 was re-released on October 15, 2013.

In Region 2, Revelation Films released the first four seasons on DVD in the United Kingdom in 2007/2008.

Nickelodeon (Paramount Home Entertainment) also re-released the series on DVD in the US through Amazon.com's CreateSpace service beginning with two random-episode "volumes" released in 2013. However, those releases were canceled and were followed by proper season set releases beginning in 2014. These releases were designed to look like books.

On December 1, 2014, it was announced that Madman Films had acquired the rights to the series in Australia, and would be releasing the series through Via Vision Entertainment. In 2015, Via Vision released seasons 1–3 individually. On September 22, 2017, it was announced that Via Vision Entertainment had no plans to release the remaining seasons of Are You Afraid of the Dark?

Release name	Ep #	Region 1 (US)	Region 1 (Canada)	Region 2 (UK)	Region 4 (Australia)
Freaky Favorites	6	December 8, 1999	N/A	N/A	N/A
The Complete 1st Season	13	June 23, 2014	April 18, 2006; May 28, 2013 (re-release)	N/A	February 4, 2015
The Complete 2nd Season	13	June 26, 2014	November 28, 2006; October 15, 2013 (re-release)	N/A	March 11, 2015
The Complete 3rd Season	13	September 24, 2014	April 24, 2007	N/A	April 10, 2015
The Complete 4th Season	13	October 2, 2014	November 13, 2007	N/A	N/A
The Complete 5th Season	13	October 15, 2014	February 26, 2008	N/A	N/A
The Complete 6th Season	13	N/A	April 29, 2008	April 29, 2008	N/A
The Complete 7th Season	13	N/A	August 19, 2008	August 19, 2008	N/A
The Limited Series Event	6	August 11, 2020	N/A	N/A	N/A
Curse of the Shadows	6	August 10, 2021	N/A	N/A	N/A
Ghost Island	4	August 1, 2023	N/A	N/A	N/A
The Complete Series 1 & 2	26	N/A	N/A	March 5, 2007	N/A
The Complete Series 3 & 4	26	N/A	N/A	April 7, 2008	N/A

=== Online distribution ===
The complete first five seasons of the series have been released (non-sequentially) across ten volumes in digital format on iTunes, Amazon, and Vudu:

Release name	Ep #	Release date
Volume 1	7	October 17, 2011
Volume 2	7	January 30, 2012
Volume 3	7	April 30, 2012
Volume 4	6	August 6, 2012
Volume 5	6	August 20, 2012
Volume 6	7	October 1, 2012
Volume 7	4	September 30, 2013
Volume 8	8	March 24, 2014
Volume 9	8	March 24, 2014
Volume 10	5	March 24, 2014

In September 2016, all seven seasons of the first two series were made available for free on YouTube for non-United States viewers. On November 6, 2017, Season one was released for free on Canada Media Fund's Encore+ YouTube channel. As of 2021, Are You Afraid of the Dark? is available on Paramount+. However, there are some missing episodes: "Tale of the Super Specs", "Tale of the Dark Dragon", "Tale of the Midnight Ride", "Tale of the Dream Girl", "Tale of Quicksilver", "Tale of the Long Ago Locket", "Tale of the Fire Ghost", "Tale of the Closet Keepers", "Tale of the Unfinished Painting", "Tale of the Chameleons", "Tale of C7", and the revival seasons six and seven.

On March 28, 2024, the revival series was removed from Paramount+ as part of a "strategic decision to focus on content with mass global appeal".

As of October 2026, Are You Afraid of the Dark? is on Tubi. Like the Paramount+ version, there are some missing episodes. Unlike Paramount+'s version, some of the episodes that weren't included on Paramount+ are on Tubi.

- Tubi's version of season one doesn't have "The Tale of the Super Specs," similar to Paramount+'s version.
- Tubi's version of season two doesn't have "The Tale of the Dark Dragon," similar to Paramount+'s version.
- Tubi's version of season three doesn't have "The Tale of the Midnight Ride," "The Tale of the Dream Girl," or "The Tale of Quicksilver," similar to Paramount+'s version.
- Tubi's version of season four has "The Tale of The Closet Keepers," "The Tale of the Fire Ghost," and "The Tale of the Unfinished Painting" (which weren't on Paramount+), but not "The Tale of the Long Ago Locket".
- Tubi's version of season 5 doesn't have "The Tale of the Chameleons" and "The Tale of C7."
- Both Tubi and Paramount+'s versions don't have any episodes from seasons six and seven (the episodes spanning from 1999 to 2000), nor do they have the 2019-2022 episodes (which were on Paramount+ until 2024).

== Reboot ==
On February 14, 2019, it was announced that the series itself would be revived for a miniseries to air in October 2019. On June 10, 2019, the cast for the miniseries was announced with Sam Ashe Arnold as Gavin, Miya Cech as Akiko, Tamara Smart as Louise, Jeremy Ray Taylor as Graham, and Lyliana Wray as Rachel as the new Midnight Society and Rafael Casal as the Carnival of Doom's ringmaster, Mr. Tophat. The miniseries aired on Fridays, October 11, 18, and 25, 2019, and was a ratings success. Brandon Routh guest starred in part two.

On February 19, 2020, it was renewed for a second season, titled Are You Afraid of the Dark?: Curse of the Shadows. On October 29, 2020, the cast for the second season was announced with Bryce Gheisar, Arjun Athalye, Beatrice Kitsos, Malia Baker, Dominic Mariche and Parker Queenan as the new Midnight Society. The second season premiered on February 12, 2021.

On March 24, 2022, the series was renewed for a third season, subtitled Ghost Island. Telci Huynh, Conor Sherry, Luca Padovan, Dior Goodjohn and Chance Hurstfield joined the cast as new members of the Midnight Society, while Julian Curtis joined the cast as a hotel manager. The third season premiered on July 30, 2022.

== Other media ==
A music video with the horror-themed dance song "Feel the Fear" was aired on Nickelodeon and included as a bonus feature on VHS tapes. The television series also spawned multiple licensed products. A PC game based on the show titled Are You Afraid of the Dark? The Tale of Orpheo's Curse was released in 1994. A board game titled Are You Afraid of the Dark?: The Game was also released. They also released a series of audio cassettes entitled Are You Afraid of the Dark?: More Tales from the Midnight Society, which were narrated and voiced by actors from the show who reprised their respective characters. Perhaps the most prominent of products from the franchise's merchandising was a series of books written by various authors between 1995 and 1999.

On November 13, 2017, it was announced that a film adaptation of the series was in the works at Paramount Players. It writer Gary Dauberman was set to write the screenplay with Matt Kaplan producing and D.J. Caruso directing. The film was scheduled to be released on October 4, 2019. However, on February 27, 2019, Paramount removed the film from their schedule.

On November 16, 2022, a series of novels and graphic novels were announced in a partnership between Abrams Children's Books and Paramount. The first middle grade novel, titled The Tale of the Gravemother and written by Rin Chupeco, was released on June 27, 2023. Horror novelist Danielle Valentine is signed on to write book two. The first graphic novel in the series, titled The Witch's Wings and Other Terrifying Tales, written by Tehlor Kay Mejia and illustrated by Justin Hernandez, Alexis Hernandez, Junyi Wu, and Kaylee Rowena, was released on October 3, 2023.

On August 24, 2023, an official podcast was announced in a partnership between Audible and Nickelodeon. The podcast, titled Are You Afraid of The Dark? The Official Podcast, was released on September 28, 2023.
