= 0–9 Series =

- Cover art for Zzzero

Compilation album by various artists
- Released: 1989
- Studio: Seven studios
- Genre: Children's
- Label: ABC for Kids/PolyGram
- Producer: Seven producers

0–9 Series is a 1989 series of ten compilation albums released by ABC for Kids. It won the ARIA Award for Best Children's Album in 1990 and was nominated for the ARIA Award for Best Cover Art in the same year.

The ten albums are aimed at children of each age from 0 to 9: 0 (or Zzzero) for 0 year olds through to 9 (or Nine) for 9 year olds. Over 270 songs were recorded for the album series with 214 appearing on the final products. The diversity provides "For newborns and parents there are lullabies (several in different languages), songs about children and sounds of nature. For tiny tots there are entertaining poems, nonsense tunes, clapping and stomping songs and for pre-teens there are contemporary pop songs that touch on some of today's social issues that concern young people." A documentary, The Making of 0–9 (1989), on the production of the albums was released alongside it. A promotional album, Zzzero–Nine Sampler, was used to advertise the releases.

Artists that appear are Adam Bowen, Aku Kadoga, Andrew Bell, Andrew Can, Angela Webber, Anne Kirkpatrick, Armando Hurley, Barry Crocker, Barry Leef, Chantelle Ormandy, Chris Bailey, Chris Lloyd, Christopher Patlon, Col Joye, Danielle Spencer, Darryl Aberhart, Dave Sandbach, Dave Sandford, Debbie Byrne, Don Spencer, Doug Parkinson, Ernie Dingo, Floyd Vincent, Gillian Eastoe, Gillian Jones, Grace Knight, Graeme Connors, Greedy Smith, Gus O'Brien, James Gillard, Jamie Rigg, Jenny Morris, Jim Conway, Joan Sydney, Joanne Jackson, John Paul Young, John Spence, Jonathan Biggins, Kerrie Biddell, Ketaki Kishor Dongre, Kiri Uu, Lana Warner, Laurie Balmer, Leonora Jackson, Linda Kenny, Linda Marr, Linda Nagle, Lizzie Clear, Lori Vallins, Lucky Starr, Malcolm McCullum, Marc Hunter, Marcus Holden, Margret RoadKnight, Maria Fotiadis, Mark Williams, Maroochy Barambah, Mary Schneider, Melanie Saloman, Mesana Salata, Mic Conway, Mic Conway's Whoopee Band, Mick Layton, Mike Kennings, Moya Simpson, Nicholas Wareham, Normie Rowe, Peter Chambers, Peter Combe, Peter Kenny, Rami Var, Rhonda Burchmore, Rick Price, Robyn Archer, Robyne Dunn, Ross Higgins, Ruth Cracknell, Sabahattin Akdagcik, Sally Dodds, Sharon O'Neill, Shauna Jensen, Stuart Grant, Su Cruickshank, Sweet Atmosphere, Tamina Haider, Tania Bowra, Terry Hannagan, Terry Kaff, Terry Murray, The Moy Sisters, Tommy Emmanuel, Trinidad Calypso Band, Trish Goddard, Wendy Grose, Wendy Matthews and Zachiary Haider.

== Albums ==
=== Zzzero ===
- Zzzero (836 861-1, 836 861-2, 836 861-4)

Side A
No.	Title	Writer(s)	Artist	Length
1.	"Going Home"	Mark Knopfler	Tommy Emmanuel	3:45
2.	"Mocking Bird/All the Pretty Little Horses"	Inez Foxx, Charlie Foxx / Traditional	Gillian Eastoe	2:15
3.	"Maranoa Lullaby"	H.O. Lethbridge, Arthur S. Loam	Maroochy Barambah	1:06
4.	"Ninna Nanna"	Traditional	Moya Simpson	1:28
5.	"Brahms' Lullaby"	Traditional	Peter Kenny	2:31
6.	"Golden Slumbers"	John Lennon, Paul McCartney	Rick Price & Wendy Matthews	2:13
7.	"Indian Lullaby"	Traditional	Ketaki Kishor Dongre	1:50
8.	"Forever Young"	Bob Dylan	Marc Hunter	4:44

Side B
No.	Title	Writer(s)	Artist	Length
1.	"Sometimes I Feel Like a Motherless Child"	Traditional	Margret RoadKnight	3:34
2.	"The Night Will Never Stay"	Eleanor Farjeon, Graeme Connors	Graeme Connors	2:11
3.	"Greek Lullaby"	Traditional	Maria Fotiadis	1:47
4.	"Turn Around"	Malvina Reynolds, Alan Greene, Harry Belafonte	Ruth Cracknell	2:10
5.	"Grandma's Hands"	Bill Withers	Joanne Jackson	2:54
6.	"God Bless the Child"	Billie Holiday, Arthur Herzog Jr.	Marc Hunter	4:33

=== One ===
- One (836 862-1, 836 862-2, 836 862-4)

Side A
No.	Title	Writer(s)	Artist	Length
1.	"Never Smile at a Crocodile/Crocodile Rock"	Frank Churchill, Jack Lawrence, Elton John, Bernie Taupin	Normie Rowe	3:54
2.	"A Quick Skip Before Dinner"	Mitchell, Sharon O'Neill	Sharon O'Neill	1:02
3.	"This Little Cow Eats Grass"	Traditional	Dave Sandford	0:23
4.	"The High Skip/Andy Spandy"	Andrew Bell, Eleanor Farjeon	Lizzie Clear & Lana Warner	0:36
5.	"Li'l Liza Jane"	Traditional	Floyd Vincent	1:24
6.	"Bimbo/Don't Sit Under the Apple Tree"	Rod Morris, Lew Brown, Charles Tobias, Sam H. Stept	Don Spencer & Chantelle Ormandy	2:04
7.	"Sea Shanty Medley (Note: The songs in this medley are Here Is The Sea, What Shall We Do With A Drunken Sailor, Dance To Your Daddy, Donkey Riding, Blow The Man Down & Here Is The Sea (Reprise). Not listed in notes of album)"	Traditional	Graeme Connors, James Gillard, Marcus Holden & Peter Kenny	4:46
8.	"Pigeons and Crows"	Traditional	Melanie Saloman	0:23
9.	"Rockin' Robin"	Leon René	The Moy Sisters	1:45
10.	"Hokey Pokey"	Traditional	Dave Sandford	0:25
11.	"Tiffy Taffy"	Michael Rosen, Andrew Bell	Lizzie Clear & Lana Warner	1:19
12.	"Chop Chop Chippity Chop"	Traditional	Trish Goddard	0:21
13.	"Baby Food"	Robyn Archer	Robyn Archer	2:39
14.	"Berceuse Pour Rêver"	Traditional	Jamie Rigg	2:08
15.	"When You're Smiling"	Larry Shay, Mark Fisher, Joe Goodwin	Grace Knight	1:44
16.	"Sunset"	Tommy Emmanuel	Tommy Emmanuel	2:30

Side B
No.	Title	Writer(s)	Artist	Length
1.	"This Old Man Comes Rolling Home"	Traditional	Trish Goddard	1:43
2.	"Jerry Hall"	Traditional	Joan Sydney	0:07
3.	"Tip Top"	Andrew Bell, Michael Rosen	Trish Goddard	0:13
4.	"Little Red Car"	Ros Price, Graeme Connors	Graeme Connors	2:52
5.	"Baby's Drinking Song"	Graeme Connors	Graeme Connors	0:24
6.	"Coots Eat Waterbeetles"	John Manifold	Chris Bailey	0:17
7.	"Insallah"	Traditional	Sabahattin Akdağcık	1:56
8.	"Pop Goes the Weasel"	Traditional	Trish Goddard	1:43
9.	"Kennebunk Port"	Malvina Reynolds	Anne Kirkpatrick	2:00
10.	"Gurrwayi, Gurrwayi, the Rainbird"	Jenny Hunter Brown, Pat Torres	Ernie Dingo & Maroochy Barambah	1:09
11.	"Banana"	Lord Burgess, William Attaway	Aku Kadoga	0:54
12.	"Babes in the Wood"	Traditional	Tania Bowra	1:36
13.	"Gershwin Lullaby"	Traditional	Graeme Connors	1:55
14.	"Why Worry"	Mark Knopfler	John Spence	4:15

=== Two ===
- Two (836 863-1, 836 863-2, 836 863-4)

Side A
No.	Title	Writer(s)	Artist	Length
1.	"Oodnadatta, Parramatta"	Ronald Oliver Brierley	Jim Conway	1:23
2.	"Sand Between My Fingers"	Ros Price, Sharon O'Neill	Sharon O'Neill	1:30
3.	"Cat's Got the Measles"	Floyd Vincent, Jenny Hunter-Brown	Tamina & Zachiary Haider	0:19
4.	"The Witch"	Michael Dugan	Melanie Saloman	0:48
5.	"Family Treasures"	Graeme Connors, Margaret Mahy	Anne Kirkpatrick	1:15
6.	"See You Later, Alligator"	Robert Guidry	Col Joye	2:38
7.	"I've Got an Itch"	Jack Prelutsky, Floyd Vincent, Jenny Hunter-Brown	Floyd Vincent	1:58
8.	"The Glowworm"	Paul Lincke, Heinz Bolten-Backers, Johnny Mercer	Jim Conway	0:48
9.	"Sing a Song of Sixpence"	Traditional	Tania Bowra	1:12
10.	"The Kangaroo"	Floyd Vincent, Jenny Hunter-Brown	Mic Conway	1:17
11.	"Squeezes"	Brian Patten, Graeme Connors	Gillian Eastoe	0:22
12.	"There Was a Crooked Man"	Traditional	Armando Hurley	1:51
13.	"The Guppy"	Ogden Nash	Joan Sydney	0:27
14.	"Ralphy Balfen"	Grace Knight	Grace Knight	1:17
15.	"Five Little Monkeys"	Floyd Vincent, Jenny Hunter-Brown	Floyd Vincent	1:36
16.	"Slowly, Slowly"	Traditional	Leonora Jackson	0:55
17.	"Three Fleas"	Graeme Connors	James Gillard	1:07
18.	"Heigh-Ho"	Frank Churchill, Larry Morey	Darryl Aberhart & Andrew Can	1:20

Side B
No.	Title	Writer(s)	Artist	Length
1.	"Medley a. "I'm Forever Blowing Bubbles" b. "Splish Splash" c. "Singin' in the Bathtub""	a. John Kellette, Jaan Kenbrovin b. Bobby Darin, Murray Kaufman c. Herb Magidson, Ned Washington, Michael Cleary	a. Mic Conway b. Col Joye c. Mic Conway	4:00
2.	"Something's Drastic"	Michael Rosen	Mic Conway	0:31
3.	"The Clever Rabbit"	David Henry Souter, Graeme Connors	Anne Kirkpatrick	0:45
4.	"Where"	Walter de la Mare	Stuart Grant	0:53
5.	"Beni Vi Tui"	Traditional	Aku Kadoga	0:50
6.	"At the Codfish Ball"	Lew Pollack, Sidney D. Mitchell	Su Cruickshank & Linda Nagle	1:10
7.	"The Duck"	Ogden Nash	Joan Sydney	0:35
8.	"An Elephant Goes"	Traditional	Linda Kelly & Graeme Connors	1:17
9.	"I Sing the Song of Froggie Swimming"	Graeme Connors, Morris Lurie	Peter Chambers	2:22
10.	"I Put Out to Sea"	Andrew Bell, Michael Rosen	Barry Leef	0:50
11.	"I Wish I Was a Little Grub/Isn't It Funny"	Jenny Morris	Jenny Morris	0:33
12.	"Mrs. Moon"	Andrew Bell, Roger McGough	Stuart Grant	0:48
13.	"Coming Home (The Song of the Naturalist's Wife)"	Donovan Leitch	Graeme Connors	2:20
14.	"Fascinating Rhythm"	George Gershwin, Ira Gershwin	Kerrie Biddell	2:33

=== Three ===
- Three (836 864-1, 836 864-2, 836 864-4)

Side A
No.	Title	Writer(s)	Artist	Length
1.	"Hiccup"	Gillian Eastoe	Gillian Eastoe	1:06
2.	"Tailpiece"	Max Fatchen	Dave Sandford	0:13
3.	"Pick Me Up"	Robyn Archer	Robyn Archer	2:21
4.	"The Name Game"	Shirley Ellis, Lincoln Chase	Aku Kadoga	1:28
5.	"Ickle Me, Pickle Me, Tickle Me Too"	Shel Silverstein	Tania Bowra	2:18
6.	"Two Witches"	Alexander Resnikoff	Melanie Saloman	0:31
7.	"Chickery Chick"	Sidney Lippman, Sylvia Dee	Ross Higgins & Jonathan Biggins	1:58
8.	"Granny's Boot"	Spike Milligan, Graeme Connors	Joan Sydney	1:00
9.	"Healthy Pig"	Ros Price, Graeme Connors	James Gillard	0:51
10.	"Jiribuga the Porcupine"	Floyd Vincent, Jenny Hunter-Brown, Pat Torres	Ernie Dingo & Maroochy Barambah	0:40
11.	"The Cow"	Traditional	Aku Kadoga	0:54
12.	"The Worm"	Floyd Vincent, Jenny Hunter-Brown, Pat Torres	Mic Conway	0:38
13.	"The Woody Woodpecker Song"	George Tibbles, Ramey Idriss	Ross Higgins	2:09
14.	"Kilkenny Cats"	Traditional	Gus O'Brien	0:52
15.	"Pet Parade"	Hoyt Axton	Terry Hannigan	2:22

Side B
No.	Title	Writer(s)	Artist	Length
1.	"The Little Red Hen"	Malvina Reynolds	Don Spencer	2:09
2.	"Goodness Gracious"	Gillian Eastoe / Traditional	Gillian Eastoe	1:25
3.	"Let's Twist Again"	Kal Mann, Dave Appell	Greedy Smith	2:11
4.	"Josephine"	Jones	Aku Kadoga	0:54
5.	"Simon Says"	Elliot Chiprut	Armando Hurley	2:49
6.	"Signals"	Shel Silverstein	Dave Sandbach	0:15
7.	"You Twiddle Your Thumbs"	Traditional	Stuart Grant, Dave Sandford & Andrew Bell	1:11
8.	"When the Red, Red Robin (Comes Bob, Bob, Bobbin' Along)"	Harry M. Woods	Mic Conway	1:46
9.	"Multikertwigo"	Spike Milligan, Graeme Connors	James Gillard	0:34
10.	"Jiminy Cricket"	Leigh Harline, Ned Washington	Ross Higgins	2:07
11.	"Ow Sut Mohowri"	Traditional	Rami Var	1:29
12.	"Day-O (The Banana Boat Song)"	Lord Burgess, William Attaway	Armando Hurley	2:58

=== Four ===
- Four (836 865-1, 836 865-2, 836 865-4)

Side A
No.	Title	Writer(s)	Artist	Length
1.	"Ananacy the Spiderman"	Young	Armando Hurley	2:22
2.	"Happy Talk"	Richard Rodgers, Oscar Hammerstein II	Grace Knight	1:56
3.	"Dr. Knickerbocker"	Traditional	Aku Kadoga	3:00
4.	"Louder Than a Thunder Clap"	Jack Prelutsky	Mic Conway	1:25
5.	"Forty Performing Bananas"	Graeme Connors, Jack Prelutsky	Mick Layton	1:17
6.	"The Owl and the Pussycat"	Edward Lear, Graeme Connors	Mick Layton	2:50
7.	"Goosey Goosey Gander"	Traditional	Robyn Archer & Mic Conway	0:21
8.	"Trn Da Ti Eh"	Traditional	Mesana Salata	1:20
9.	"Windy Nights"	Floyd Vincent, Jenny Hunter-Brown, Robert Louis Stevenson	Robyne Dunn	2:45
10.	"High Hopes"	Sammy Cahn, Jimmy Van Heusen	Debra Byrne	2:46
11.	"Muddly Muddly"	Joy Cowley	Jenny Morris, Joan Sydney & Gillian Jones	0:56
12.	"The Purple People Eater"	Sheb Wooley	Barry Leef	2:14

Side B
No.	Title	Writer(s)	Artist	Length
1.	"Nursery Rhyme Rap"	Mark Weeks	Armando Hurley	2:15
2.	"Digital Watch / Hickory Dickory"	Michael Rosen, Traditional	Leonora Jackson	0:26
3.	"Wimoweh"	Paul Campbell, Solomon Linda	Terry Kaff	3:07
4.	"The Ships"	James K. Baxter, Louis McManus	John Paul Young	1:53
5.	"Nightening"	Michael Dugan	Melanie Saloman	0:11
6.	"Greedy Dog"	James Hurley, Mark McDuff	Tania Bowra	1:46
7.	"Jollity Farm"	Leslie Sarony	Mic Conway's Whoopee Band	2:45
8.	"The Umbrella Man"	James Cavanaugh, Larry Stock, Vincent Rose	Ross Higgins	2:13
9.	"Frosty the Snowman"	Walter Rollins, Steve Nelson	Lori Vallins	2:11
10.	"Let 'Em In"	Paul McCartney	Mark Williams	3:58

=== Five ===
- Five (836 866-1, 836 866-2, 836 866-4)

Side A
No.	Title	Writer(s)	Artist	Length
1.	"Emma Hackett's Newsbook"	Allan Ahlberg, Graeme Connors	Shauna Jensen	0:30
2.	"Fish Fingers"	Max Fatchen	Dave Sandford	0:13
3.	"Running Bear"	J.P. Richardson	Anne Kirkpatrick	2:54
4.	"If Pigs Could Fly"	Graeme Connors, James Reeves	Sally Dodds	2:30
5.	"My Brain"	Robyn Archer	Robyn Archer	2:48
6.	"Happy Birthday Dear Dragon"	Jack Prelutsky	Joan Sydney	1:48
7.	"Sneezes"	Grace Knight	Grace Knight	1:00
8.	"Ooby Dooby"	Dick Penner, Wade Lee Moore	John Spence	2:18
9.	"Alice Song"	Andrew Bell	Stuart Grant	1:37
10.	"Hermano Chay"	Traditional	Linda Marr	2:01
11.	"Juba"	Traditional	Aku Kadoga	1:05
12.	"The Peanut"	Graeme Connors	Anne Kirkpatrick	0:48
13.	"Heart of the Country"	Paul McCartney, Linda McCartney	Gillian Eastoe	2:34

Side B
No.	Title	Writer(s)	Artist	Length
1.	"Court of King Caractacus"	Rolf Harris	Terry Hannagan	2:09
2.	"Bushrangers"	Floyd Vincent, Isobel Kendall Bowden, Jenny Hunter-Brown	Tania Bowra & Robyne Dunn	1:42
3.	"The Skye Boat Song"	Harold Boulton	Wendy Matthews	3:50
4.	"Beep Beep"	Carl Cicchetti, Donald Claps	Sweet Atmosphere	3:00
5.	"Heads or Tails"	Graeme Connors, Kit Wright	Mike Kennings	1:28
6.	"There is a Thing"	Jack Prelutsky	Chris Bailey	0:59
7.	"Seventy-Six Trombones"	Meredith Willson	Barry Crocker	1:27
8.	"With His Mouth Full of Food"	Shel Silverstein	Chris Bailey	1:25
9.	"The Trouble with My Brother"	Brian Patten, Graeme Connors	Mike Kennings	2:11
10.	"Viru Polka"	Traditional	Kiru Uu	2:30
11.	"I Know Someone"	Graeme Connors, Michael Rosen	Christopher Patlon	1:36
12.	"You Can't Roller Skate in a Buffalo Herd"	Roger Miller	Terry Hannagan	2:04
13.	"The Bogeyman"	Jack Prelutsky	Stuart Grant	1:47

=== Six ===
- Six (836 867-1, 836 867-2, 836 867-4)

Side A
No.	Title	Writer(s)	Artist	Length
1.	"Cat's Got Fleas"	R & M Martin	Floyd Vincent	2:34
2.	"Dead Skunk"	Loudon Wainwright III	Gillian Eastoe	2:52
3.	"Ghost Riders in the Sky"	Stan Jones	Mary Schneider	2:05
4.	"The Sound of the Wind"	Andrew Bell, Christina Rossetti	Wendy Matthews	1:25
5.	"Michael Built a Bicycle"	Graeme Connors, Jack Prelutsky	James Gillard	1:48
6.	"The Walk"	Colin Timms	Armando Hurley	1:10
7.	"Ode to an Extinct Dinosaur"	Doug MacLeod, Robyne Dunn	Robyne Dunn	1:12
8.	"Thingth I Thay"	Peter Combe	Peter Combe	3:26
9.	"A Little Soulful Tune"	Taj Mahal	Aku Kadoga	0:38
10.	"Ubangi Stomp"	Earl Bostic	Greedy Smith	1:57

Side B
No.	Title	Writer(s)	Artist	Length
1.	"Papa Oom Mow Mow"	Carl White, Al Frazier, Sonny Harris, Turner Wilson Jr.	Jenny Morris	2:45
2.	"Don't"	Colin Timms, Michael Rosen	Angela Webber & Adam Bowen	0:52
3.	"Does Your Chewing Gum Lose Its Flavour?"	Marty Bloom, Ernest Breuer, Billy Rose	Mic Conway's Whoopee Band	2:18
4.	"Back Seat Tragedy"	Robyn Archer	Robyn Archer	2:17
5.	"Abre Kako"	Traditional	Mesana Selata	2:04
6.	"Up and Down"	Graeme Connors, Sally Farrell Odgers	Peter Chambers, Mick Layton, Sally Dodds & Wendy Grose	3:50
7.	"Bird Eats Fruit"	Graeme Connors, Ros Price	Tania Bowra	2:50
8.	"Limbo Rock"	Jon Sheldon, Billy Strange	Trinidad Calypso Band	2:34

=== Seven ===
- Seven (836 868-1, 836 868-2, 836 868-4)

Side A
No.	Title	Writer(s)	Artist	Length
1.	"Super Computer"	Allan Caswell, Don Spencer	Don Spencer	2:22
2.	"Feeding the Family"	Brian Patten, Colin Timms	Chris Bailey & Gillian Eastoe	1:12
3.	"Life on Mars"	Colin Timms, Roger McGough	Melanie Saloman	1:02
4.	"Monster Mash"	Bobby Pickett, Leonard L. Capizzi	Ross Higgins	3:51
5.	"My Dad Snores"	John Williamson	Anne Kirkpatrick	2:35
6.	"Feelin' Groovy"	Paul Simon	Tania Bowra	1:44
7.	"When You're Eating"	Floyd Vincent, Jenny Hunter-Brown	Ernie Dingo	0:33
8.	"Great Expectations"	Graeme Connors, Robin Klein	Gillian Eastoe & Shauna Jensen	2:37
9.	"Eagle Rock"	Ross Wilson	Barry Leef	3:41

Side B
No.	Title	Writer(s)	Artist	Length
1.	"Mean Old Mean Hyena"	Graeme Connors, Jack Prelutsky	James Gillard	2:05
2.	"Backwards Bill"	Shel Silverstein	Aku Kadoga	1:27
3.	"Island in the Sun"	Harry Belafonte, Lord Burgess	Armando Hurley	2:45
4.	"Tobiyo"	Traditional	Mesana Salata	1:39
5.	"Limericks a. "There Was an Old Man" b. "One Summer at Tea" c. "A Sea Serpent" d. "There Was a Fat Lady""	Floyd Vincent, Jenny Hunter-Brown	Chris Bailey	1:42
6.	"Flabbergaster"	Colin Timms, Doug MacLeod	Adam Bowen	0:27
7.	"Friendship"	Cole Porter	Nicholas Wareham & Danielle Spencer	1:57
8.	"I've Been Everywhere"	Geoff Mack	Lucky Starr	2:15
9.	"An Ant's Eye View"	Graeme Connors	Graeme Connors	2:33
10.	"Gimme Dat Ding"	Albert Hammond, Mike Hazlewood	Mic Conway's Whoopee Band	2:19

=== Eight ===
- Eight (836 869-1, 836 869-2, 836 869-4)

Side A
No.	Title	Writer(s)	Artist	Length
1.	"Girls Just Want to Have Fun"	Robert Hazard	Grace Knight	3:07
2.	"Piggies Anthem"	R & M Martin	Rhonda Burchmore	2:20
3.	"Transfusion"	Jimmy Drake	Sweet Atmosphere	2:31
4.	"Down on the Corner"	John Fogerty	Malcolm McCullum, Chris Lloyd, Armando Hurley & Jamie Rigg	2:40
5.	"There's a Monkey Sitting in the Family Tree"	Graeme Connors	Graeme Connors	2:10
6.	"Working Bee"	Tania Bowra	Tania Bowra	2:52

Side B
No.	Title	Writer(s)	Artist	Length
1.	"Apeman"	Ray Davies	Barry Leef	4:00
2.	"Galaxy Song"	Eric Idle, John Du Prez	Jonathon Biggins	2:40
3.	"I'm in a Rotten Mood"	Graeme Connors, Jack Prelutsky	Laurie Balmer	0:54
4.	"Listen to the Wind"	Graeme Connors	Grace Knight	3:34
5.	"Stomi Omilelo Malo"	Traditional	Celia White, Jarni Birmingham, Jenny Dornan, Linda Dawson & Moya Simpson	0:58
6.	"The Magpies"	Denis Glover, Graeme Connors	Graeme Connors	3:22
7.	"Sun Arise"	Rolf Harris, Harry Butler	Darryl Aberhart	3:20

=== Nine ===
- Nine (836 870-1, 836 870-2, 836 870-4)

Side A
No.	Title	Writer(s)	Artist	Length
1.	"Water for the Flowers"	Alan Mansfield, Sharon O'Neill	Sharon O'Neill	3:20
2.	"Cost of Living"	Chris Harriott	Darryl Aberhart	2:17
3.	"Three Little Birds"	Bob Marley	Armando Hurley	3:06
4.	"Horror Movie"	Greg Macainsh	Gillian Eastoe	3:55
5.	"Swimming Song"	Loudon Wainwright III	Anne Kirkpatrick	2:26
6.	"Ballet Dancing Boffer Boys"	Doug MacLeod	Terry Murray	1:17

Side B
No.	Title	Writer(s)	Artist	Length
1.	"Old Time Rock and Roll"	George Jackson, Thomas E. Jones III	Normie Rowe	2:48
2.	"Jeremiah Peabody's..."	Ray Stevens	Doug Parkinson	2:51
3.	"Gitarzan"	Ray Stevens, Bill Everette	Terry Hannagan	3:27
4.	"Money Moans"	Graeme Connors, Peter Kenny, Roger McGough	Lori Vallins	2:27
5.	"You Can Get It If You Really Want"	Jimmy Cliff	Armando Hurley	3:01

=== Zzzero–Nine Sampler ===
- Zzzero–Nine Sampler (Kids 1)

This was the promo album for the series containing songs from each album

Side A
No.	Title	Writer(s)	Artist	Length
1.	"Water for the Flowers"	Alan Mansfield, Sharon O'Neill	Sharon O'Neill	3:20
2.	"Down on the Corner"	John Fogerty	Malcolm McCullum, Chris Lloyd, Armando Hurley & Jamie Rigg	2:40
3.	"Granny's Boot"	Spike Milligan, Graeme Connors	Joan Sydney	1:00
4.	"Happy Talk"	Richard Rodgers, Oscar Hammerstein II	Grace Knight	1:56
5.	"The Ships"	James K. Baxter, Louis McManus	John Paul Young	1:53
6.	"Going Home"	Mark Knopfler	Tommy Emmanuel	3:45
7.	"God Bless The Child"	Billie Holiday, Arthur Herzog Jr.	Marc Hunter	4:33
8.	"Papa Oom Mow Mow"	Carl White, Al Frazier, Sonny Harris, Turner Wilson Jr.	Jenny Morris	2:45

Side B
No.	Title	Writer(s)	Artist	Length
1.	"Monster Mash"	Bobby Pickett, Leonard L. Capizzi	Ross Higgins	3:51
2.	"The Peanut"	Graeme Connors	Anne Kirkpatrick	0:48
3.	"Pick Me Up"	Robyn Archer	Robyn Archer	2:21
4.	"Never Smile at a Crocodile/Crocodile Rock"	Frank Churchill, Jack Lawrence, Elton John, Bernie Taupin	Normie Rowe	3:54
5.	"With His Mouth Full Of Food"	Shel Silverstein	Chris Bailey	1:25
6.	"Let's Twist Again"	Kal Mann, Dave Appell	Greedy Smith	2:11
7.	"Skye Boat Song"	Harold Boulton	Wendy Matthews	3:50
8.	"Splish Splash"	Bobby Darin, Murray Kaufman	Col Joye	2:07

== Awards and nominations ==
Award	Year	Recipient(s) and nominee(s)	Category	Result
ARIA Music Awards	1990	0-9 Series	Best Children's Album	Won
ARIA Music Awards	1990	0-9 Series	Best Cover Art	Nominated
