= ARIA Award for Best Children's Album =

Annual Australian music industry award

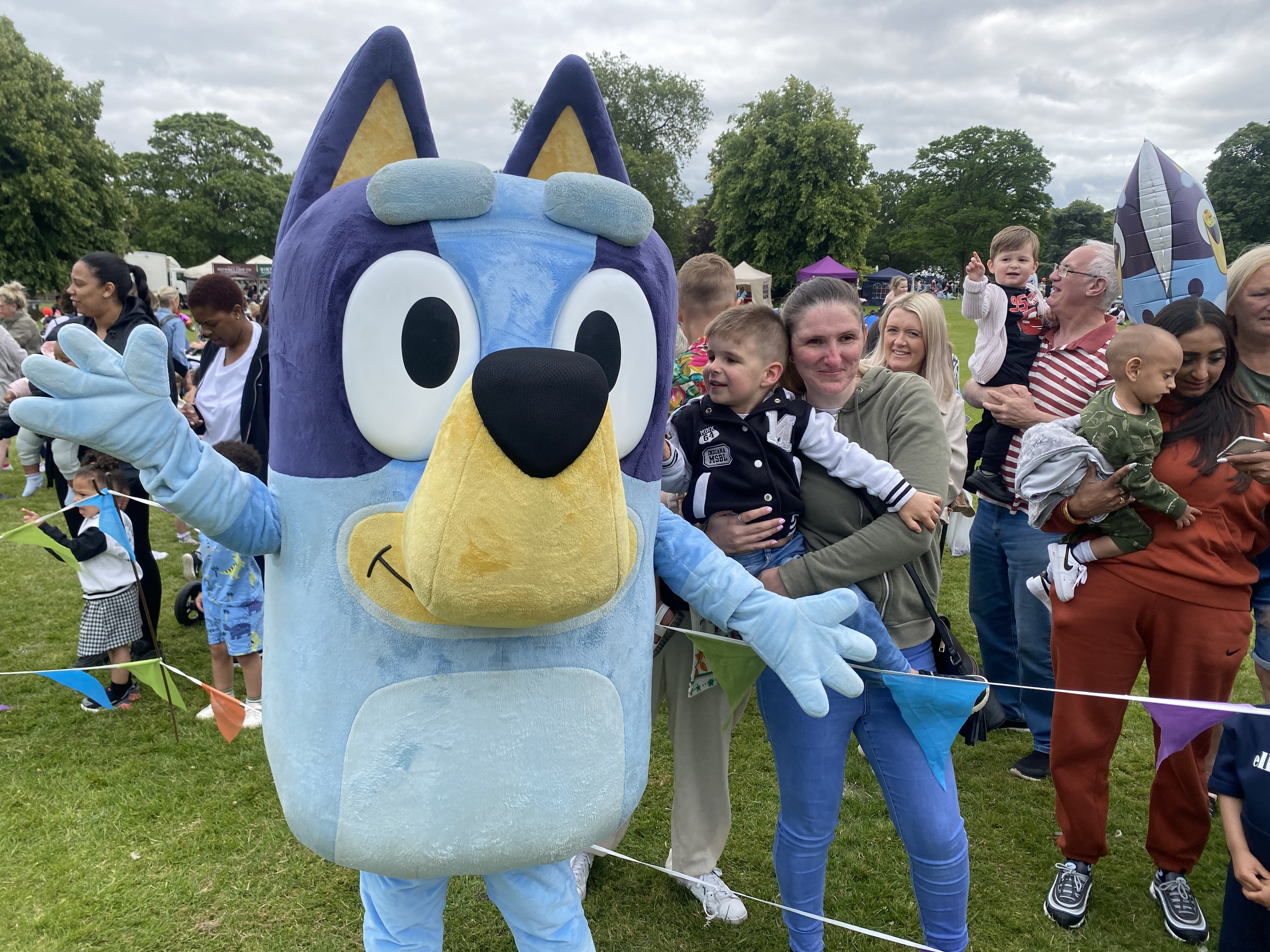
- 2026 winner Bluey
- Country: Australia
- Presented by: Australian Recording Industry Association (ARIA)
- First award: 1988
- Currently held by: Bluey, Up Here (The Orchestral Album) (2026)

Highlights
- Most wins: The Wiggles (15)
- Most nominations: The Wiggles (32)
- Website: ariaawards.com.au

The ARIA Music Award for Best Children's Album is an award presented at the annual ARIA Music Awards, which recognises "the many achievements of Aussie artists across all music genres", since 1987. It is handed out by the Australian Recording Industry Association (ARIA), an organisation whose aim is "to advance the interests of the Australian record industry."

The Wiggles hold the record for both the most wins in this category (or any category) and the most nominations, with 15 wins from 32 nominations. They are also the only artist to receive two nominations in the same year, as both Go to Sleep Jeff! and Whoo Hoo! Wiggly Gremlins! were nominated in 2003. Franciscus Henri has the most nominations without a win with seven. Three artists have won in consecutive years; Peter Combe in 1988 and 1989, additionally contributing to the 0–9 Series of various artists albums which won in 1990, with fellow contributor Robyn Archer winning the following year; the Wiggles in 1995 and 1996 and again from 2005 to 2012; and Hi-5 from 2000 to 2004, with all five of their wins being consecutive. The animated television series Bluey has won all three of its nominations, being the only artist to achieve this feat.

== Winners and nominees ==
In the following table, the winner is highlighted in a separate colour, and in boldface; the nominees are those that are not highlighted or in boldface.

Winner marked in a separate colour

Year	Winner(s)	Album title
**1988** (2nd)	**Peter Combe**	**Toffee Apple**
**1989** (3rd)
**1989** (3rd)	**Peter Combe**	**Newspaper Mama**
**1989** (3rd)	Darryl Cotton	Just for Kids
**1989** (3rd)	Noni Hazlehurst	Shout and Whisper
**1989** (3rd)	Harold G Raffe and Co	Harold and Friends
**1989** (3rd)	John Schumann	John Schumann Goes Looby-Loo
**1989** (3rd)	Don Spencer	Australian Animal Songs
**1989** (3rd)	The Wayfarers	Home Among the Gum Trees – Songs For Aussie Kids
**1989** (3rd)	Fay White	Did You See The Wind Today?
**1990** (4th)
**1990** (4th)	**Various Artists**	**0–9 Series**
**1990** (4th)	Don Spencer	Australia for Kids
**1990** (4th)	Noni Hazlehurst and Sydney Symphony Orchestra	Peter and the Wolf/The Carnival of the Animals
**1990** (4th)	Peter Combe	Chopsticks
**1990** (4th)	The Cast of Pugwall	Pugwall – Original Music from the Television Series
**1991** (5th)
**1991** (5th)	**Robyn Archer**	**Mrs Bottle's Burp** (Note: The full title for this album is Mrs Bottle's (Absolutely Blurtingly Beautiful World-Beating) Burp.)
**1991** (5th)	Agro	The Agro Album
**1991** (5th)	Don Spencer	Let's Have Fun
**1991** (5th)	Glynn Nicholas and The Funky Fossils	The Dinosaur Album
**1991** (5th)	John Williamson	JW's Family Album
**1992** (6th)
**1992** (6th)	**Peter Combe**	**The Absolutely Very Best of Peter Combe (So Far) Recorded in Concert**
**1992** (6th)	Agro	Agro Too
**1992** (6th)	Ruth Cracknell	Paul Gallico's The Snow Goose
**1992** (6th)	Noni Hazlehurst	Noni Sings Day and Night Songs and Rhymes from Play School
**1992** (6th)	Franciscus Henri	Dancing in the Kitchen
**1993** (7th)
**1993** (7th)	**ABC Symphony Orchestra**	**Classic Kids**
**1993** (7th)	Franciscus Henri	Walking On The Milky Way
**1993** (7th)	Mike Jackson	Rufty Tufty
**1993** (7th)	George Spartels	George from Play School
**1993** (7th)	The Tin Lids	Snakes & Ladders
**1994** (8th)
**1994** (8th)	**Mic Conway**	**Whoopee!**
**1994** (8th)	Bananas in Pyjamas	Bananas in Pyjamas
**1994** (8th)	Colin Buchanan	I Want My Mummy
**1994** (8th)	Franciscus Henri	My Favourite Nursery Rhymes
**1994** (8th)	Monica Trapaga	Monica's Tea Party
**1995** (9th)
**1995** (9th)	**The Wiggles**	**Big Red Car**
**1995** (9th)	Adelaide Symphony Orchestra	Dream Child (Note: The actual title for this album is Dream Children.)
**1995** (9th)	Cinderella Acappella	Cinderella Acappella
**1995** (9th)	Franciscus Henri	I'm Hans Christian Andersen
**1995** (9th)	Play School	Oomba Baroomba
**1996** (10th)
**1996** (10th)	**The Wiggles**	**Wake Up Jeff!**
**1996** (10th)	Bananas in Pyjamas	It's Singing Time!
**1996** (10th)	Christine Hutchinson	Grand Fairies Ball
**1996** (10th)	Gillian Eastoe	Extra Awesome Intergalactical Expedition (Note: The full title for this album is Extra Awesome Intergalactical Expedition Into the Far Reaches and Back.)
**1996** (10th)	Peter Combe	Little Groover
**1997** (11th)
**1997** (11th)	**Play School**	**In the Car**
**1997** (11th)	Mic Conway	What's That Sound?
**1997** (11th)	Franciscus Henri	Mr Whiskers
**1997** (11th)	The Hooley Dooleys	Splash
**1997** (11th)	Monica Trapaga	Monica's House
**1998** (12th)
**1998** (12th)	**The Wiggles**	**Toot Toot!**
**1998** (12th)	The Flowerpot Gang	Happy Little Flower Pots
**1998** (12th)	The Hooley Dooleys	Ready Set... Go!
**1998** (12th)	George Spartels	Let's Go Out
**1998** (12th)	Don Spencer	Australian Classics
**1999** (13th)
**1999** (13th)	**The Hooley Dooleys**	**Pop**
**1999** (13th)	Australian Girls Choir and National Boys Choir	Australian Christmas Spirit
**1999** (13th)	Cubbyhouse	Rock Cake
**1999** (13th)	Franciscus Henri	Hooray For Mr Whiskers
**1999** (13th)	Monica Trapaga	Monica's Trip to the Moon
**2000** (14th)
**2000** (14th)	**Hi-5**	**Jump and Jive with Hi-5**
**2000** (14th)	The Flowerpot Gang	Flower Pot Gang
**2000** (14th)	Mister Whiskers	Monkey Business
**2000** (14th)	Play School	Hullabaloo
**2000** (14th)	The Wiggles	It's a Wiggly Wiggly World
**2001** (15th)
**2001** (15th)	**Hi-5**	**It's a Party**
**2001** (15th)	George Spartels, Queensland Philharmonic Orchestra, Sean O'Boyle	George Meets the Orchestra
**2001** (15th)	The Hooley Dooleys	Keep On Dancing
**2001** (15th)	Monica Trapaga	I Love the Zoo
**2001** (15th)	The Wiggles	Hoop Dee Doo: It's a Wiggly Party
**2002** (16th)
**2002** (16th)	**Hi-5**	**Boom Boom Beat**
**2002** (16th)	The Hooley Dooleys	Roll Up! Roll Up!
**2002** (16th)	The Star Girls	The Star Girls from Planet Groove
**2002** (16th)	Tasmanian Symphony Orchestra, Sean O'Boyle	Symphony of Lullabies
**2002** (16th)	The Wiggles	Wiggly Safari
**2003** (17th)
**2003** (17th)	**Hi-5**	**Celebrate**
**2003** (17th)	Play School	Hip Hip Hooray
**2003** (17th)	The Saddle Club	On Top of the World
**2003** (17th)	The Wiggles	Go to Sleep Jeff!
**2003** (17th)	The Wiggles	Whoo Hoo! Wiggly Gremlins!
**2004** (18th)
**2004** (18th)	**Hi-5**	**Holiday**
**2004** (18th)	Amica	Life Is Fun
**2004** (18th)	The Hooley Dooleys	Wonderful
**2004** (18th)	The Saddle Club	Friends Forever
**2004** (18th)	The Wiggles	Top of the Tots
**2005** (19th)
**2005** (19th)	**The Wiggles**	**Live Hot Potatoes!**
**2005** (19th)	Bananas in Pyjamas	Sing and Be Happy
**2005** (19th)	Hi-5	Making Music
**2005** (19th)	Sean O'Boyle	Hush Little Baby
**2005** (19th)	The Hooley Dooleys	Super Dooper
**2006** (20th)
**2006** (20th)	**The Wiggles**	**Racing to the Rainbow**
**2006** (20th)	Hi-5	Wish Upon a Star
**2006** (20th)	Justine Clarke	I Like to Sing!
**2006** (20th)	The Fairies	Fairy Magic
**2006** (20th)	The Hooley Dooleys	Smile
**2007** (21st)
**2007** (21st)	**The Wiggles**	**Pop Go the Wiggles!**
**2007** (21st)	Bindi Irwin	Bindi Kidfitness with Steve Irwin and The Crocmen
**2007** (21st)	Christine Anu	Chrissy's Island Family
**2007** (21st)	Coco's Lunch	Rat Trap Snap
**2007** (21st)	Hi-5	Wow! (Note: Despite the album being officially nominated, it currently isn't listed on the ARIA Awards website of past nominees.)
**2007** (21st)	The Fairies	Fairy Beach
**2008** (22nd)
**2008** (22nd)	**The Wiggles**	**You Make Me Feel Like Dancing**
**2008** (22nd)	Hi-5	Planet Earth (deluxe edition)
**2008** (22nd)	Jay Laga'aia	Come Dance and Sing
**2008** (22nd)	Justine Clarke	Songs to Make You Smile
**2008** (22nd)	The Fairies	Fairy Fun, Fun, Fun
**2009** (23rd)
**2009** (23rd)	**The Wiggles**	**Go Bananas!**
**2009** (23rd)	Bindi Irwin	Bindi Kidfitness 2 Jungle Dance Party
**2009** (23rd)	Georgie Parker	Here Comes the Sun
**2009** (23rd)	The Fairies	Princess Perfect
**2009** (23rd)	The Saddle Club	Best Friends
**2010** (24th)
**2010** (24th)	**The Wiggles**	**Let's Eat!**
**2010** (24th)	Greta Bradman	Forest of Dreams: Classical Lullabies to Get Lost In
**2010** (24th)	Jay Laga'aia	I Can Play Anything
**2010** (24th)	Justine Clarke	Great Big World
**2010** (24th)	Little Kasey Chambers, Poppa Bill and the Little Hillbillies	Little Kasey Chambers, Poppa Bill and the Little Hillbillies
**2011** (25th)
**2011** (25th)	**The Wiggles**	**Ukulele Baby!**
**2011** (25th)	Dirtgirlworld	Dig It
**2011** (25th)	Hi-5	Turn the Music Up!
**2011** (25th)	Holly Throsby	See!
**2011** (25th)	Play School	Let's Play Together
**2012** (26th)
**2012** (26th)	**The Wiggles**	**Surfer Jeff**
**2012** (26th)	Bananas in Pyjamas	Playtime!
**2012** (26th)	Dirtgirlworld	Dirtgirl Rocks The Planet
**2012** (26th)	Hi-5	Sing It Loud
**2012** (26th)	Rhys Muldoon	I'm Not Singing
**2013** (27th)
**2013** (27th)	**Justine Clarke**	**A Little Day Out with Justine Clarke**
**2013** (27th)	Giggle and Hoot	Claw Tapping Tunes
**2013** (27th)	Jay Laga'aia	Ten in the Bed
**2013** (27th)	Sam Moran	Play Along with Sam
**2013** (27th)	The Wiggles	Taking Off!
**2014** (28th)
**2014** (28th)	**The Wiggles**	**Apples & Bananas**
**2014** (28th)	Alex Papps	Let's Put the Beat in Our Feet
**2014** (28th)	Ali McGregor	Ali McGregor's Jazzamatazz
**2014** (28th)	Jay Laga'aia	Christmas at Jay's Place
**2014** (28th)	Sam Moran	Play Along with Sam: We're Gonna Dance!
**2015** (29th)
**2015** (29th)	**Sam Moran**	**Play Along with Sam: BOO!**
**2015** (29th)	Giggle and Hoot	Hootastic Tunes
**2015** (29th)	Play School	Favourite Things – Songs and Nursery Rhymes from Play School
**2015** (29th)	Rhys Muldoon	Perfect Is the Enemy of Good
**2015** (29th)	The Wiggles	Rock & Roll Preschool
**2016** (30th)
**2016** (30th)	**The Wiggles**	**Wiggle Town!**
**2016** (30th)	Justine Clarke	Pyjama Jam!
**2016** (30th)	Pat Davern	Alexander the Elephant in Zanzibar
**2016** (30th)	Play School	Famous Friends: Celebrating 50 Years of Play School
**2016** (30th)	Sam Moran	Play Along with Sam: BEST. DAY. EVER!
**2017** (31st)
**2017** (31st)	**Jimmy Barnes**	**Och Aye the G'Nu!** (Note: Although this album was released by Jimmy Barnes, The Wiggles' trademark logo appears on the covers. This is why people from The Wiggles helped Jimmy Barnes work on the album during production throughout 2016.)
**2017** (31st)	Lah-Lah	Having Fun!
**2017** (31st)	Peter Combe	Live It Up
**2017** (31st)	The Idea of North, Lior and Elena Kats-Chernin	A Piece of Quiet (The Hush Collection, Vol. 16)
**2017** (31st)	The Wiggles	The Wiggles Duets
**2018** (32nd)
**2018** (32nd)	**Justine Clarke**	**The Justine Clarke Show!**
**2018** (32nd)	Lah-Lah	10th Birthday Party
**2018** (32nd)	Sam Moran	Santa's Coming!
**2018** (32nd)	Teeny Tiny Stevies	Helpful Songs for Little People
**2018** (32nd)	The Wiggles	Wiggle Pop!
**2019** (33rd)
**2019** (33rd)	**Dan Sultan**	**Nali & Friends**
**2019** (33rd)	Kamil Ellis and Ensemble Offspring	Classic Kids: Music for the Dreaming
**2019** (33rd)	Regurgitator's Pogogo Show	The Really Really Really Really Boring Album
**2019** (33rd)	The Beanies	Imagination Station
**2019** (33rd)	The Wiggles	Party Time!
**2020** (34th)
**2020** (34th)	**Teeny Tiny Stevies**	**Thoughtful Songs for Little People**
**2020** (34th)	Diver City	Welcome to Diver City
**2020** (34th)	The Vegetable Plot	Season 2
**2020** (34th)	The Wiggles	Choo Choo Trains, Propeller Planes & Toot Toot Chugga Chugga Big Red Car!
**2020** (34th)	Tiptoe Giants	Colour the World
**2021** (35th)
**2021** (35th)	**Bluey**	**Bluey: The Album**
**2021** (35th)	Amber Lawrence	The Kid's Gone Country 2: Fun for All the Family
**2021** (35th)	Diver City	Dance Silly
**2021** (35th)	The Wiggles	Lullabies With Love
**2021** (35th)	Various Artists	The Moon, The Mouse & The Frog: Lullabies from Northern Australia
**2022** (36th)
**2022** (36th)	**The Wiggles**	**ReWiggled**
**2022** (36th)	Benny Time	Benny and Friends
**2022** (36th)	Teeny Tiny Stevies	How to be Creative
**2022** (36th)	The Beanies	Let's Go!
**2022** (36th)	Van-Anh Nguyen	The Princess and The Piano
**2023** (37th)
**2023** (37th)	**Emma Memma**	**Emma Memma**
**2023** (37th)	Peter Combe	Planet Earth 3rd From The Sun
**2023** (37th)	Play School	Very Jazzy Street Party
**2023** (37th)	The Wiggles	Ready, Steady, Wiggle!
**2023** (37th)	Whistle & Trick	Bananas And Other Delicious Things
**2024** (38th)
**2024** (38th)	**Bluey**	**Dance Mode!**
**2024** (38th)	Emma Memma	Twirly Tunes
**2024** (38th)	Josh Pyke	It's Gonna Be a Great, Great Day!
**2024** (38th)	The Wiggles	Wiggle and Learn: 100 Educational Songs for Children
**2024** (38th)	Zindzi & the Zillionaires	Zindzi & the Zillionaires
**2025** (39th)
**2025** (39th)	**Emma Memma**	**Dance Island Party**
**2025** (39th)	Justine Clarke	Mimi's Symphony
**2025** (39th)	Teeny Tiny Stevies	Brain Fart
**2025** (39th)	The Vegetable Plot	Season 3
**2025** (39th)	The Wiggles	Wiggle Up, Giddy Up!
**2026** (40th)
**2026** (40th)	**Bluey**	**Up Here (The Orchestral Album)**
**2026** (40th)	Don Spencer	Feathers, Fur or Fins 40th Anniversary (Don Spencer and Friends)
**2026** (40th)	Emma Memma	Jungle Picnic
**2026** (40th)	Play School	Dance It Out
**2026** (40th)	The Wiggles	Sparkle!: A Circus of Lights

== Artists with multiple wins ==
15 wins

- The Wiggles (Note: Including Och Aye the G'nu, a collaborative album with Jimmy Barnes.)

6 wins

- Sam Moran (Note: Including five as a member of the Wiggles from 2007 to 2011.)

5 wins

- Hi-5
- Emma Watkins (Note: Including three as a member of the Wiggles in 2014, 2016 and 2022; credited as Emma Memma on solo releases.)

4 wins

- Peter Combe (Note: Including the 0–9 Series of various artists albums.)

3 wins

- Bluey

2 wins

- Robyn Archer
- Justine Clarke
- Mic Conway

== Artists with multiple nominations ==
32 nominations

- The Wiggles

14 nominations

- Emma Watkins (Note: Including 10 as a member of the Wiggles from 2013 to 2022 and her contribution to Famous Friends: Celebrating 50 Years of Play School; credited as Emma Memma on solo releases.)

11 nominations

- Justine Clarke (Note: Including four as a presenter of Play School in 2003, 2011, 2015 and 2023.)
- Hi-5

10 nominations

- Sam Moran

9 nominations

- Play School

8 nominations

- Peter Combe
- The Hooley Dooleys

7 nominations

- Franciscus Henri (Note: Credited as Mister Whiskers on one album.)
- Jay Laga'aia (Note: Including three as a presenter of Play School in 2003, 2011 and 2015.)
- Don Spencer (Note: Including the 0–9 Series of various artists albums and his contribution to Famous Friends: Celebrating 50 Years of Play School.)

6 nominations

- Noni Hazlehurst (Note: Including three as a presenter of Play School in 1995, 1997 and 2000.)
- Monica Trapaga (Note: Including two as a presenter of Play School in 1995 and a special guest in 2023.)

5 nominations

- George Spartels (Note: Including two as a presenter of Play School in 1995 and 2000.)

4 nominations

- Bananas in Pyjamas
- Colin Buchanan
- The Fairies
- Rhys Muldoon (Note: Including two as a presenter of Play School in 2003 and 2011.)
- Teeny Tiny Stevies

3 nominations

- Bluey
- Mic Conway
- Sean O'Boyle
- The Saddle Club

2 nominations

- Agro
- Robyn Archer
- The Beanies
- Ruth Cracknell
- Dirtgirlworld
- Diver City
- Gillian Eastoe
- The Flowerpot Gang
- Giggle and Hoot
- Bindi Irwin
- Lah-Lah
- Zindzi Okenyo (Note: Including one as a presenter of Play School in 2015 and one as Zindzi & the Zillionaires.)
- Alex Papps (Note: Including one as a presenter of Play School in 2011.)
- Georgie Parker
- Dan Sultan (Note: Including his contribution to Famous Friends: Celebrating 50 Years of Play School.)
- The Vegetable Plot
