= Amica (band) =

Australian pop group

- Genres: Children's, pop
- Years active: 2002-2004
- Label: ABC for Kids
- Members: Brandie; Merrity 'Mez' Murphy; Natalie 'Nat' Strother; Daniella 'Dan' Taliangis; Kristina 'Kris' Visocchi

Amica is an Australian pop group targeting 6 to 12-year-olds. Their album Life is Fun was nominated for the ARIA Award for Best Children's Album in 2004.

Originally a four piece of Merrity 'Mez' Murphy, Natalie 'Nat' Strother, Daniella 'Dan' Taliangis and Kristina 'Kris' Visocchi (née Karhunen), they released their first single "Life Is Fun" in 2003. It debuted at #90 on the ARIA single charts. Mez departed in mid 2003 and the band continued as a three piece. They released a second single, "Rock Star" later that year and it debuted at #80. They released their album Life is Fun in April 2004. By mid 2004 Brandie had replaced Dan and the band broke up in July 2004.

== Band members ==
- Brandie
- Merrity 'Mez' Murphy
- Natalie 'Nat' Strother
- Daniella 'Dan' Taliangis
- Kristina 'Kris' Visocchi

== Discography ==
=== Album ===
List of albums, with selected details
Title	Details
Life Is Fun	Released: 2004; Format: CD; Label: ABC Music (300909-2)

=== Singles ===
List of singles, with selected chart positions
Title	Year	Peak chart positions	Album
Title	Year	AUS	Album
"Life Is Fun"	2003	90	Life Is Fun
"Rock Star"	2003	80	Life Is Fun

== Awards and nominations ==
=== ARIA Music Awards ===
Year	Nominated works	Award	Result
2004	Life is Fun	Best Children's Album	Nominated
