= Classic Kids =

Compilation album by ABC Symphony Orchestra
- Released: 1992
- Genre: Classical Music
- Length: 42 Min
- Label: ABC for Kids

Classic Kids is a compilation album of classical music compiled by Stephen McGhee. It was released in 1992 by the Australian Broadcasting Corporation and was subtitled A Fun Way for Children to Enjoy the Classics. Whilst sometimes credited to ABC Symphony Orchestra, it was recorded by various Australian orchestras, conductors and soloists. A 68-page teachers guide was available with the album. The album won the ARIA Award for Best Children's Album in 1993.

== Track listing ==
William Tell overture
1. Finale (Gioachino Rossini)

Nutcracker
2. March (Pyotr Ilyich Tchaikovsky)
3. Trepak (Tchaikovsky)
4. Flight of the bumble bee (Nikolai Rimsky-Korsakov)

Snugglepot and Cuddlepie
5. Mrs Kookaburra (Richard Mills)
6. Perpetum mobile (Johann Strauss II)
7. Seven little Australians (Bruce Smeaton)
8. The Washington Post (John Philip Sousa)
9. Dance of the toy flutes (Tchaikovsky)

Carnival of the animals
10. The swan (Camille Saint-Saëns)
11. The elephant (Saint-Saëns)

Eight Russian folk songs
12. I danced with a mosquito (Anatoly Liadov)

Comedians
13. Gallop (Dmitry Kabalevsky)

The nutcracker
14. Dance of the sugar plum fairy (Tchaikovsky)

Nursery suite
15. The merry doll (Edward Elgar)
16. Shepherd's hey (Percy Grainger)

Ballet suite no. 1
17. Dance (Dmitry Shostakovich)

Romeo & Juliet
18. The street awakens (Sergei Prokofiev)
19. Radetsky march (Johann Strauss I)
20. Show people (Carl Davis)

== Personnel ==
Orchestras

- Melbourne Symphony Orchestra
- Queensland Symphony Orchestra
- Sydney Symphony Orchestra
- Tasmanian Symphony Orchestra
- West Australian Symphony Orchestra

Conductors

- Werner Andreas Albert
- Myer Fredman
- Peter Grunberg
- John Hopkins
- Richard Mills
- Roland Peelman
- Vladimir Ponkin
- Shalom Ronly-Riklis
- Albert Rosen
- Bruce Smeaton

Musicians

- Anthony Baldwin (Piano)
- David Bollard (Piano)
- David Pereira (Cello)
- Walter Sutcliffe (Double Bass)
