= Harold and Friends =

Harold and Friends is a 1988 various artists album credited to Harold G Raffe and Co. It is aimed at teaching young children about their bodies. Artists appearing on the album include Ricky May, Normie Rowe, Doug Ashdown, Maggie McKinney, Karen Johns, Allan Caswell and Cameron Daddo. It was nominated for the ARIA Award for Best Children's Album in 1989.

Harold G Raffe is one of the names given to Healthy Harold, a giraffe mascot for Life Education Australia.

== Tracklist ==
1. Let's Talk About Life
2. Harold (We Wanna Be All Like You)
3. I Can Always Rely On Me
4. All Your Body Needs
5. Balanced Diet
6. Skin
7. Super Computer
8. Keep Your Cool
9. Personality
10. I'm Your Body
