= Go to Sleep Jeff! =

Studio album by the Wiggles
- Released: 9 September 2003 (USA)
- Studios: Electric Avenue Studios, Sydney, Australia
- Genre: Children's music
- Label: ABC
- Producer: Anthony Field

The Wiggles chronology
Wiggle Bay (2002)	Go to Sleep Jeff! (2003)	Whoo Hoo! Wiggly Gremlins! (2003)

Go to Sleep Jeff is the Wiggles' 16th album, released in 2003 by ABC Music and distributed by Roadshow Entertainment. The album was nominated for the ARIA Award for Best Children's Album but lost to Hi-5's Celebrate.

AllMusic described it as "a superb sleep-time album for the young ones," rating it four and a half stars.

== Track list ==
1. Introduction
2. Lullaby Overture
3. Introduction
4. I Love it When it Rains
5. Introduction
6. Take A Trip Out On The Sea
7. Introduction
8. Aspri Mera Key Ya Mas (instrumental)
9. Introduction
10. Maranoa Lullaby (from Central Australia)
11. Introduction
12. Polish Lullaby (Star Lullaby)
13. Introduction
14. October Winds
15. Introduction
16. John of Dreams
17. Introduction
18. Go to Sleep Jeff (instrumental) (Brahms' Lullaby)
19. Introduction
20. Georgia's Song
21. Anthony's Message
22. Lullaby Overture (instrumental)
23. I Love it When It Rains
24. Take a Trip Out on the Sea
25. Aspri Mera Key Ya Mas (Greek lullaby)
26. Polish Lullaby (Star lullaby)
27. Go to Sleep Jeff (Brahams' lullaby)
28. Georgia's Song
