= Whoo Hoo! Wiggly Gremlins! =

2003 studio album/video by The Wiggles

- US cover

Studio album by The Wiggles
- Released: June/July 2003
- Studio: Electric Avenue Studios, Sydney, Australia
- Genre: Children's music
- Label: ABC
- Producer: Anthony Field

The Wiggles chronology
Go to Sleep Jeff! (2003)	Whoo Hoo! Wiggly Gremlins! (2003)	Top of the Tots (2003)

Whoo Hoo! Wiggly Gremlins! is the 17th album by children's music group The Wiggles. It was released in 2003 by ABC Music distributed by Roadshow Entertainment. It was nominated for the ARIA Award for Best Children's Album in 2003 but lost to Hi-5's Celebrate.

== Track list ==
All tracks written by Murray Cook, Jeff Fatt, Anthony Field, Greg Page, John Field, Dominic Lindsay except listed below.

No.	Title	Writer(s)	Length
1.	"Welcome to Network Wiggles!"	Lindsay
2.	"Lights, Camera, Action, Wiggles!"
3.	"Introduction"
4.	"Gulp Gulp"
5.	"Introduction"
6.	"Anthony's Workshop"
7.	"Introduction"
8.	"Testing, One, Two, Three"
9.	"Introduction"
10.	"Bit By Bit (We're Building a Set)"	Cook, Fatt, Field, Page, John Field, Paul Field
11.	"Introduction"
12.	"Vegetable Soup"	Cook, Fatt, Field, Page, John Field, Paul Field, Lindsay
13.	"Introduction"
14.	"Hats"
15.	"Music With Murray"
16.	"Introduction"
17.	"Camera One"
18.	"Community Service Announcement!"
19.	"Weather, Weather, Weather"
20.	"Introduction"
21.	"Dressing Up"
22.	"Introduction"
23.	"Calling All Cows"	Cook, Fatt, Field, Page, John Field, Lindsay, Paul Paddick
24.	"Introduction"
25.	"Where's Jeff?"
26.	"Introduction"
27.	"Knock Knock, Who's There?"
28.	"Wiggly Sports Theme"
29.	"The Dancing Flowers"	Alfonso Rinaldi

== Charts ==
Chart performance for Whoo Hoo! Wiggly Gremlins!
Chart (2003)	Peak position
Australian Albums (ARIA)	95

== Video ==
Whoo Hoo! Wiggly Gremlins!
- Directed by: Nicholas Bufalo
- Written by: Greg Truman
- Produced by: The Wiggles
- Starring: Anthony Field; Greg Page; Jeff Fatt; Murray Cook; Paul Paddick; Corinne O'Rafferty; Andrew McCourt; Kristy Talbot; Simon Pryce; Kase Amer; Sharryn Dermody; Ben Murray; Larissa Wright
- Edited by: David Hutchison
- Music by: The Wiggles
- Distributed by: Roadshow/ABC Video
- Release date: 1 September 2003
- Running time: 53 minutes
- Country: Australia

The video "Whoo Hoo! Wiggly Gremlins" was also released in 2003.

=== Song list ===
1. "Camera One"
2. "Gulp Gulp"
3. "Testing One, Two, Three"
4. "Bit By Bit (We're Building a Set)"
5. "Vegetable Soup"
6. "Hats"
7. "Music with Murray"
8. "Lights, Camera, Action, Wiggles!"
9. "Dressing Up"
10. "Where's Jeff?"
11. "Anthony's Workshop"

=== Bonus songs ===
- "The Dancing Flowers"
- "Go to Sleep Jeff" (Brahms' Lullaby)

=== Cast ===
The cast as presented on the videos: The Wiggles:

- Murray Cook
- Jeff Fatt
- Anthony Field
- Greg Page

Additional cast

- Paul Paddick as Captain Feathersword
- Corrine O'Rafferty as Dorothy the Dinosaur
  - Jacqueline Field as Voice of Dorothy
- Andrew McCourt as Wags the Dog
- Kristy Talbot as Henry the Octopus
- Simon Pryce and Kase Amer as Gremlins
- Sharryn Dermody, Ben Murray, and Larissa Wright as Stagehands/Dancers
- Dominic Field and Joseph Field as Junior Stagehands
- Nicholas Bufalo as Voice of Big Red Car

=== Releases ===
- Australia: 1 September 2003
- USA: 27 July 2004
