= Diver City =

Australian children's music group

- Genres: Children's
- Label: ABC Kids
- Members: KLP; Matt Okine
- Website: https://www.divercity.com.au/

Diver City are an Australian children's music duo made up of KLP and Matt Okine. They have been nominated for the ARIA Award for Best Children's Album in 2020 for Welcome to Diver City and in 2021 for Dance Silly.

In 2019 Okine and KLP, colleagues at Triple J, had separately become parents within a week. Soon after they got together to work on an album of music aimed at young children, with much of the work done during COVID lockdown.

== Discography ==
=== Albums ===
List of albums, with selected details
Title	Details
Welcome to Diver City	Released: 28 August 2020; Format: digital; Label: ABC Music
Dance Silly	Released: 27 August 2021; Format: digital; Label: ABC Music

=== Extended plays ===
List of albums, with selected details
Title	Details
Weekend Baby	Released: February 2025; Format: digital; Label: ABC Music

== Awards and nominations ==
=== AIR Awards ===
The Australian Independent Record Awards (known colloquially as the AIR Awards) is an annual awards night to recognise, promote and celebrate the success of Australia's Independent Music sector.

Year	Nominee / work	Award	Result	Ref.
2021	Welcome to Diver City	Best Independent Children's Album or EP	Nominated	
2022	Dance Silly	Best Independent Children's Album or EP	Nominated	
2026	Weekend Baby	Best Independent Children's Album or EP	Nominated	

=== ARIA Awards ===
The ARIA Music Awards is an annual awards ceremony that recognises excellence, innovation, and achievement across all genres of Australian music.

Year	Nominee / work	Award	Result	Ref.
2020	Welcome to Diver City	Best Children's Album	Nominated	
2021	Dance Silly	Best Children's Album	Nominated	
