= Ferry Boat Fred =

Australian children's tv series

- Genre: Children; Slice of life
- Created by: John Pye
- Written by: John Pye
- Directed by: Mark Osborn
- Narrated by: Jack Osborn
- Theme music composer: John Pye
- Opening theme: "Ferry Boat Fred" theme
- Ending theme: "Ferry Boat Fred" theme
- Composer: John Pye
- Country of origin: Australia
- Original language: English

Production
- Producer: John Pye
- Production companies: Polka Dot Productions; Australian Film Commission; ABC Television Children's Department

Original release
- Network: ABC
- Release: 30 March – 1 May 1992

Ferry Boat Fred is an Australian children's programme which was first broadcast in 1992 on ABC. The main character is a ferry on Sydney Harbour in Sydney, Australia named Fred, along with his older sister Kate, two other ferries, Lou and Bill, as well as Jean, a really jolly and colourful submarine. There is also his Captain, a koala who is always found asleep behind Fred's wheel (due to koalas finding it difficult to stay awake all day). Fred has a voluntary deck hand named Pete, a "know-it-all" Pelican (also best known for his catchphrase, "No worries!") who befriends Fred and follows him around the harbour, assisting Fred and tying him up at Wallaby Wharf.

The show was a success during its limited run. It was created by Polka Dot Productions, a company set up by the Producer/Writer John Pye in 1992 with 25 episodes. John Pye, a model maker originally from Dagenham, London, England, grew up watching the classic British children's TV shows, Ivor the Engine and Noggin the Nog (made by Oliver Postgate's Smallfilms). Not only did Pye write the scripts and compose the incidental music but was also responsible for making most of the models. The entire series was filmed by Pye and three friends in a loft in the inner Sydney suburb of Surry Hills. The narrator is Jack Osborn. A revamp was being made as of 2015; however, has been put on indefinite hiatus due to serious medical issues that John Pye had; leading to his death on 22 May 2025.

== Characters ==
- Fred, a small yellow ferry, the main character.
- Kate, a purple ferry who is Fred's big sister.
- Bill, a fast blue ferry.
- Lou, a big red ferry.
- Jean, a naughty blue submarine who likes to cause chaos around the harbour.
- Spike, an Echidna mechanic.
- Pelican Pete, Fred's constant companion and Deckhand.
- Captain Koala, the captain of Fred who is always falling asleep.
- Emily, an Emu who loves to shop around the harbour.
- Belinda Brushtail, a brushtail possum who works as the lighthouse keeper during the night and always sleeps in the daytime.

== Episode list ==
Series 1

1. Fred Meets Pete (30 March 1992)
2. Fred's Birthday Party (31 March 1992)
3. Fred's Sister Kate (1 April 1992)
4. Fred Goes to the Doctor (2 April 1992)
5. The Ferry Race (3 April 1992)
6. Pete The Magician (6 April 1992)
7. Belinda's Blown Bulb (7 April 1992)
8. Kate's Lost Bell (8 April 1992)
9. Major Mitchell's Washing (9 April 1992)
10. Fred at the Fairground (10 April 1992)
11. Jean the Submarine (13 April 1992)
12. Pete's Nephew Percy (14 April 1992)
13. Fred's Bad Dream (15 April 1992)
14. Fred Joins a Band (16 April 1992)
15. Fred and the Seagulls (17 April 1992)
16. Fred the Floating Zoo (20 April 1992)
17. Kate the Painter (21 April 1992)
18. Kate's Fancy Dress Party (22 April 1992)
19. Fred's Fishing Trip (23 April 1992)
20. Night Time Noises (24 April 1992)
21. Pete the Water Skier (27 April 1992)
22. Kate at the Fairground (28 April 1992)
23. Fred and the Whales (29 April 1992)
24. Emily's Lost Shopping (30 April 1992)
25. Fred Says Goodbye (1 May 1992)

== Credits ==
- Told by: Jack Osborn
- Director of Photography: Lawrence Kirkwood
- Production Design: James Sawars
- Production Assistant: Paul Lockwood
- Models Made and Filmed at: Modelcraft Pty Ltd
- Music: John Pye
- A.B.C. Associate Producer: Glen Daly
- Editor: Neela Sarkar
- Sound Effects: Ian Neilson
- Telecine: John Galbrath & Walter Pilarski
- Special Thanks: Lynn Gallay, Bert Deling, Matthew Roche, Steve Mosley
- Created, Written and Produced by: John Pye
- Director: Mark Osborn

== Merchandise ==
- The series also had a few merchandising products including a book called "The Great Race" which featured the episodes "The Ferry Race" and "Night Time Noises" combined, several T-shirts, a music album on CD and cassette which featured the theme song and songs performed by various Australian children's performers such as George Spartels, Franciscus Henri and Gillian Eastoe, two videos which only include 17 of the 25 episodes and a spoken word cassette containing 11 episodes including the two episodes "Major Mitchell's Washing" and "Belinda's Blown Bulb" which were never released on video.

== International Broadcasts ==
- In Ireland, the series was broadcast on RTÉ2 as part of their programming block for children The Den.
- In Portugal, the series was broadcast on RTP and was known as "Um Ferry chamado Fred".
- In New Zealand, the series was broadcast on FTN.
