= Cubby House (band) =

Australian children's rock'n'roll band

- Genres: Children's, rock'n'roll
- Years active: 1997-1999
- Labels: ABC for Kids, Festival Records
- Members: Annerose de Jong; Kerry Digby; Stephen Knight; Jenni Milnes; Jason Rooke; Peter Winkler (producer and director)

Cubby House were an Australian rock'n'roll band aimed at 3 to 8-year-olds. Their album Rock Cake was nominated for the ARIA Award for Best Children's Album in 1999.

== Members ==
- Annerose de Jong - vocals
- Kerry Digby - drums
- Stephen Knight - bass and mandolin
- Jenni Milnes - guitar, keyboards, harmonica and vocals
- Jason Rooke - guitar and vocals
- Peter Winkler - producer and director

== Discography ==
=== Albums ===
- Rock the House (1997) - ABC Music
- Rock Cake (1998) - Festival Records

== Awards and nominations ==
=== ARIA Music Awards ===
Year	Nominated works	Award	Result
1999	Rock Cake	Best Children's Album	Nominated
