= Tiptoe Giants =

Australian children's music group

- Genres: Children's
- Years active: 2019-
- Labels: Tiptoe Tunes; ABC Kids
- Members: Leanne King; Megan Lipworth; Vanessa Couper
- Website: https://www.tiptoegiants.com/

Tiptoe Giants are an award-winning Australian children's music group made up of Leanne (Lee) King, Megan (Meg) Lipworth, and Vanessa (Vee) Couper. Their music is aimed at children from 0 to 7 years old. Winners of the 2023 APRA Song of the Year for Little River Runs, their collaboration with Josh Pyke, and nominees for Album of the Year for 2023 release Small But Mighty. They were nominated for the ARIA Award for Best Children's Album in 2020 for their sophomore album, Colour the World, and have had successes in the International Songwriting Competition, Australian Independent Record Labels AIR Awards, and more.

== Albums ==
- Little Steps Big Adventures
- Colour the World
- Small But Mighty - Hearty Hits For Living Large

== Awards and nominations ==
=== ARIA Awards ===
Year	Nominated works	Award	Result
2020	Colour the World	Best Children's Album	Nominated

=== AIR Awards ===
Year	Nominated works	Award	Result
2022	Outside Time (My Favourite Time of Day)	Best Independent Children's Album or EP	Nominated

=== Major Minor Music Awards ===
Year	Nominee / work	Award	Result	Ref.
2023	"Little River Runs" (with Josh Pyke)	APRA Song of the Year	Won	
