= Live at Jive =

Live album by Peter Combe
- Released: 2008
- Venue: Jive, Adelaide, April 2008
- Genre: Children's music
- Label: Peter Combe Music
- Producer: Peter Combe

Peter Combe chronology
Classic Fairy Tales Volume 3 (2006)	Live at Jive (2008)	Moovy Groovy Songs (2009)

Live at Jive a live album by Australian children's musician Peter Combe. It was released in 2008.

Combe said "I'm so thrilled that Australian kids who grew up with my music and are now 20 something are coming along to music venues and singing the songs all over again". The album notably features Combe's son Tom Combe, and one of his daughters Emily Combe, as well as Phil Cunneen, who has been playing with Combe since his original popularity.

== Track listing ==
1. "Big Yellow Ball"
2. "Syntax Error"
3. "Jack & the Beanstalk"
4. "Saturday Night"
5. "Baghdad"
6. "Spangle Road"
7. "Down in the Bathroom"
8. "Hadrian's Wall"
9. "Exterminate"
10. "Lullaby (for Thom)"*
11. "Tadpole Blues"
12. "Jeffrey Hill"
13. "Chops & Sausages"
14. "Chopsticks"
15. "Rock & Roll is All You Need"
16. "The Walking Song"
17. "Rain"
18. "Nutrition Blues"
19. "Toffee Apple"
20. "Newspaper Mama"
21. "Spaghetti Bolognaise"
22. "Mr Clicketty Cane"
23. "Tell Me the Ti-i-ime Please"
24. "Juicy Juicy Green Grass"
- Note that the spelling of Thom differs to the original release on the album Toffee Apple which didn't include the H (i.e. Tom)
- All songs composed, arranged and produced by Peter Combe.

== Credits ==
- Peter Combe – Guitar; Lead Vocals
- Phil Cunneen – keyboards; Guitar; vocals
- Thomas Combe – Rhythm and Lead Guitar; Trumpet; vocals
- Steve Fleming – Bass; Mandolin; Violin; vocals
- Steve Todd – drums
- Emily Combe – vocals

== Release history ==
Region	Date	Format	Label
Australia	2008	CD+DVD	Peter Combe
Australia	November 2013	digital download	Peter Combe
