= Fay White =

Fay White may refer to:

- Faye White (born 1978), English footballer
- Fay White (singer), Australian singer and songwriter
