= The Flowerpot Gang =

Australian children's musical group

The Flower Pot Gang
- Genre: Children's
- Years active: 1996–2000
- Label: ABC for Kids
- Members: Phillip Barton; Kristy Gentz; Benjamin O'Hara
- Website: camelian.com/fpgang/

The Flower Pot Gang were an Australian children's entertainment act formed in 1996 by Phillip 'Phil' Barton on guitar and vocals, Kristy Gentz on vocals and Benjamin 'Ben' O'Hara on drums and vocals. Their albums Happy Little Flower Pots (1997) and Flower Pot Gang (1999) were nominated for the ARIA Award for Best Children's Album in 1998 and 2000, respectively. The group disbanded in 2000. Barton co-wrote the song, "A Woman Like You" (2011), which was recorded by American country music artist, Lee Brice; and "Cowboys Duty" (2015), which was performed by Aron Leigh for the feature film, Sicario.

== Members ==
- Phillip Barton – guitar, vocals
- Kristy Gentz – vocals
- Benjamin O'Hara – drums, vocals

== Discography ==
=== Studio albums ===
- Fun Time! (1996) – ABC Music/EMI (8147612)
- Happy Little Flower Pots (1997) – ABC Music/EMI (7243 8 21092 2 8)
- Spot in the Park (with Spot) (1999) – ABC Music/EMI (7243 5 21397 2 9)
- Flower Pot Gang (1999) – ABC Music/EMI (7243 5 22224 2 1)

=== Video albums ===
- Under the Flower Pot Rainbow (2000) – ABC Video (102529)

== Awards and nominations ==
=== APRA Music Awards ===
Year	Nominated works	Award	Result	Ref
1998	"Bounce" (Phillip Barton)	Most Performed Children's Work	Nominated	

=== ARIA Music Awards ===
Year	Nominated works	Award	Result
1998	Happy Little Flower Pots	Best Children's Album	Nominated
2000	Flower Pot Gang	Best Children's Album	Nominated
