= Chopsticks (disambiguation) =

Chopsticks are eating utensils mainly employed in Asia.

Chopsticks may also refer to:

== Music ==
- "Chopsticks" (music), a simple piano piece
- Flohwalzer, a different piano piece often called "Chopsticks" in the United Kingdom
- Chopsticks (album), a 1989 album by Peter Combe
- The Chopsticks, a female singing duo from Hong Kong

== Other uses ==
- Chopsticks (hand game), a finger game
- Hashiwokakero, a logic puzzle sometimes mistranslated as "chopsticks"
- The Civilian War Memorial in Singapore, informally known as "Chopsticks"
- Chopsticks (film), a 2019 Indian film
