= The Star Girls =

Australian kids pop band

- Genres: Children's; pop
- Years active: 1998-2007
- Members: Dream Star (Jodie Crombie Brown); Smiley Star (Michelle Irsak); Cheeky Star (Dianne Regan); Twinkle Star (Jasmine Regan); Angel Star (Lyndal Vincent)
- Website: thestargirls.com

The Star Girls were an Australian pop band aimed at children. Their self-titled debut album The Star Girls from Planet Groove was nominated for the ARIA Award for Best Children's Album in 2002.

The Star Girls was formed by Dianne Regan. The band members included Dream Star (Jodie Crombie Brown), Smiley Star (Michelle Irsak), Cheeky Star (Dianne Regan) and Angel Star (Lyndal Vincent). They were sometimes joined by Regan's daughter, Jasmine, who went by Twinkle Star.

In 2007, a spinoff animated series called "Planet Groove Featuring the Star Girls" was created for the Nicktoons Network.

== Band members ==
- Dream Star (Jodie Crombie Brown)
- Smiley Star (Michelle Irsak)
- Cheeky Star (Dianne Regan)
- Twinkle Star (Jasmine Regan)
- Angel Star (Lyndal Vincent)

== Discography ==
=== Albums ===
- The Star Girls from Planet Groove (2002)
- Rock This World (2005)

=== Singles ===
List of singles, with selected chart positions
Title	Year	Peak chart positions
Title	Year	AUS
"Girls Like Me"	2002	74

== Awards and nominations ==
=== ARIA Music Awards ===
Year	Nominated works	Award	Result
2002	The Star Girls from Planet Groove	Best Children's Album	Nominated
