= AIR Awards of 2022 =

Edition of annual Australian music award

2022 AIR Awards
- Date: 4 August 2022
- Venue: Freemasons Hall, Adelaide, Australia
- Hosted by: Dylan Lewis and Jessica Braithwaite

Highlights
- Most wins: Genesis Owusu (3)
- Most nominations: Genesis Owusu (3)
- Website: https://air.org.au/air-awards/

The 2022 AIR Awards is the sixteenth annual Australian Independent Record Labels Association Music Awards ceremony (generally known as the AIR Awards). It took place on 4 August 2022 in Adelaide.

The nominations were revealed on 18 May 2022 with all material being released in 2021.

Owusu won three awards from three nominations. In a video acceptance speech after winning Independent Album of the Year, Owusu said, "I poured everything that I had into the making of this album, simply for my own sanity and mental well-being, so the fact that it's being recognised by so many young people globally and industry-wise is insane to me. And I'm humble and grateful for it."

The late Warren Costello was honoured with the 2022 Outstanding Achievement Award, being recognised for his more than 30 years spent supporting independent artists and labels, including time spent as the managing director for Liberation Music.

== Performances ==
- Jesswar
- Telenova
- Teenage Joans
- Jaguar Jonze
- Andrew Swift

== Nominees and winners ==
=== AIR Awards ===
Winners indicated in boldface, with other nominees in plain.

Independent Album of the Year	Independent Song of the Year
**Genesis Owusu - Smiling with No Teeth**; Amyl and the Sniffers - Comfort to Me; Courtney Barnett - Things Take Time, Take Time; Liz Stringer – First Time Really Feeling; The Jungle Giants - Love Signs	**Genesis Owusu - "Smiling with No Teeth"**; Casey Barnes – "God Took His Time on You"; Jaguar Jonze – "Who Died and Made You King?"; King Stingray – "Get Me Out"; Vance Joy – "Missing Piece"
Breakthrough Independent Artist of the Year	Best Independent Blues and Roots Album or EP
**Telenova**; Maple Glider; Martha Marlow; Milan Ring; Teenage Joans	**Liz Stringer – First Time Really Feeling**; Angus & Julia Stone – Life Is Strange; Maple Glider - To Enjoy Is the Only Thing; Martha Marlow - Medicine Man; The Teskey Brothers with Orchestra Victoria – Live at Hamer Hall
Best Independent Children's Album or EP	Best Independent Classical Album or EP
**The Wiggles - Lullabies with Love**; Diver City - Dance Silly; Spotty Kites - Easter Songs for Kids; Tiptoe Giants - Outside Time (My Favourite Time of Day); The Beanies - Let's Go!	**Genevieve Lacey and Marshall McGuire - Bower**; Australian Chamber Orchestra and Richard Tognetti - River; Grigoryan Brothers - This Is Us: A Musical Reflection of Australia; Mirusia - Live in Concert; Nat Bartsch - Hope
Best Independent Country Album or EP	Best Independent Dance or Electronica Album or EP
**Felicity Urquhart and Josh Cunningham - The Song Club**; Andrew Swift - The Art of Letting Go; Georgia State Line - In Colour; Tex Perkins & The Fat Rubber Band - Tex Perkins & The Fat Rubber Band; The Wolfe Brothers - Kids on Cassette	**Flight Facilities - Forever**; June Jones – Leafcutter; Kučka - Wrestling; Pretty Girl – Middle Ground; Telenova – Tranquilize (Remixes)
Best Independent Dance, Electronica or Club Single	Best Independent Heavy Album or EP
**Shouse – "Love Tonight" (David Guetta remix)**; Alice Ivy and Sycco – "Weakness"; Confidence Man - "Holiday"; June Jones - "Home"; PNAU featuring Budjerah - "Stranger Love"	**Wolf & Cub - Dusk At The Watagan Forest Motel**; LORD - Undercovers Vol.1; Mirrors - The Ego's Weight; Twelve Foot Ninja - Vengeance; Void of Vision - Chronicles I: Lust
Best Independent Hip Hop Album or EP	Best Independent Jazz Album or EP
**Genesis Owusu - Smiling with No Teeth**; Chillinit - Family Ties; Jesswar - Tropixx; Kobie Dee - Gratitude Over Pity; St Christoph & Shaade - No Pressure	**Hiatus Kaiyote - Mood Valiant**; Baby et Lulu - Album Trois; Hilary Geddes Quartet - Parkside; Joseph Tawadros - Hope in an Empty City; Sam Anning - Oaatchapai
Best Independent Pop Album or EP	Best Independent Punk Album or EP
**Big Scary - Daisy**; Imogen Clark - Bastards; Ngaiire - 3; The Jungle Giants - Love Signs; The Rubens - 0202	**Amyl and the Sniffers - Comfort to Me**; DZ Deathrays - Positive Rising: Part 2; Loser - All The Rage; Mod Con - Modern Condition; RedHook - Bad Decisions
Best Independent Rock Album or EP	Best Independent Soul/R&B Album or EP
**Courtney Barnett - Things Take Time, Take Time**; Hard-Ons - I'm Sorry Sir, That Riff's Been Taken; Hayley Mary - The Drip; Jimmy Barnes - Flesh and Blood; Mike Noga - Open Fire	**Emma Donovan & the Putbacks - Under These Streets**; Liyah Knight - The Travellers Guide; Milan Ring - I'm Feeling Hopeful; Parvyn - Sa; The Soul Movers - Evolution
Independent Label of the Year	Outstanding Achievement Award
**I OH YOU**; ABC Music; Ivy League Records; Metropolitan Groove Merchants; Milk! Records	**Warren Costello**

== See also ==
- Music of Australia
