= Martha Marlow =

Australian singer and songwriter

- Born: Martha Marlow; Australia
- Occupations: Singer; songwriter; musician
- Years active: 2014–present
- Relatives: Jonathan Zwartz, Alex Lindsay
- Website: www.marthamarlow.com

Martha Marlow, is an Australian singer, songwriter, artist and musician. Marlow's debut studio album, Medicine Man was released in May 2021 and received a nomination for Best Blues and Roots Album at the 2021 ARIA Music Awards.

== Early life ==
Martha Marlow grew up in Sydney's Eastern suburbs, surrounded by a family of musicians.

Marlow studied at the National Art School of Sydney. She grew up in the same house that the Bee Gees lived in before they moved to London. She lives with a range of illnesses including fibromyalgia, lupus and Ehlers–Danlos Syndrome.

== Career ==
In 2015, Marlow covered Randy Newman's "Feels Like Home" for a Qantas commercial.

=== 2021: Medicine Man ===
On 19 March 2021, Marlow released her debut single "Don't Want to Grow Up".

In May 2021 Marlow released her debut album Medicine Man. The 13-track original composition album was recorded with a 17 piece string ensemble, led by Veronique Serret and conducted by Daniel Denholm and produced by Jonathan Zwartz and Martha Marlow. The album received nominations for the ARIA Award for Best Blues and Roots Album and an Australian Women in Music Awards.

=== 2022: Touring and Queen of the Night ===
Throughout 2022, Marlow toured 'Medicine Man' and was nominated for further awards. She also exhibited her watercolour painting in an exhibition at Sydney's King Street Gallery. Marlow also began work on her second album, 'Queen of the Night', with pianist Chris Abrahams, which is due for release in late 2023.

== Discography ==
=== Studio albums ===
List of studio albums, with selected chart positions
Title	Details	Peak chart positions
Title	Details	AUS
Medicine Man	Released: 21 May 2021; Label: Martha Marlow (MM001CD); Formats: CD, cassette, LP	— (Note: Medicine Man did not enter the ARIA top 50, but peaked at number 6 on the Australian Independent Record Labels Association chart.)

== Awards and nominations ==
=== AIR Awards ===
The Australian Independent Record Awards (commonly known informally as AIR Awards) is an annual awards night to recognise, promote and celebrate the success of Australia's Independent Music sector.

Year	Nominee / work	Award	Result	Ref.
2022	Martha Marlow	Breakthrough Independent Artist of the Year	Nominated	
2022	Medicine Man	Best Independent Blues and Roots Album or EP	Nominated	

=== ARIA Music Awards ===
The ARIA Music Awards is an annual awards ceremony that recognises excellence, innovation, and achievement across all genres of Australian music.

Year	Nominee / work	Award	Result	Ref.
2021	Medicine Man	Best Blues and Roots Album	Nominated	

=== Australian Music Prize ===
The Australian Music Prize (the AMP) is an annual award of $30,000 given to an Australian band or solo artist in recognition of the merit of an album released during the year of award. It commenced in 2005.

Year	Nominee / work	Award	Result
2021	Medicine Man	Australian Music Prize	Nominated

=== Australian Women in Music Awards ===
The Australian Women in Music Awards (commonly known informally as AWMA) is an annual awards ceremony and conference celebrating the contributions of women in all areas of the Australian music industry. The commenced in 2018.

Year	Nominee / work	Award	Result	Ref.
2021	Herself	Emerging Artist Award	Won	
