= Top of the Tots =

2004 studio album and video by the Wiggles

- US cover

Studio album by the Wiggles
- Released: 15 December 2003 (AUS); 13 January 2004 (US); 5 April 2006 (UK)
- Recorded: January 2003
- Studios: Electric Avenue Studios, Sydney, Australia
- Genre: Children's music
- Labels: ABC Music (AUS); Koch Records (US); Hit Entertainment (UK)
- Producer: The Wiggles

The Wiggles chronology
Whoo Hoo! Wiggly Gremlins! (2003)	Top of the Tots (2003)	Cold Spaghetti Western (2004)

Top of the Tots is the 18th the Wiggles album. It was recorded in November 2003 and was released in 2004 by ABC Music distributed by Roadshow Entertainment. It was nominated for the 2004 ARIA Music Award for Best Children's Album but lost to Hi-5's Holiday.

== Track list ==
1. Bow Wow Wow (intro)
2. Bow Wow Wow
3. Central Park, New York (intro)
4. Central Park, New York
5. Cowboys and Cowgirls (intro)
6. Cowboys and Cowgirls
7. Fly Through the Sky (intro)
8. Fly Through the Sky
9. I Wave My Arms and Swing My Baton (intro)
10. I Wave My Arms and Swing My Baton
11. New York Firefighter (intro)
12. New York Firefighter
13. Picking Flowers (intro)
14. Picking Flowers
15. Say Aah at the Doctors (intro)
16. Say Aah at the Doctors
17. Feeling Chirpy (intro)
18. Feeling Chirpy
19. Lettuce Sing (Fresh Fruit and Veggies) (intro)
20. Lettuce Sing (Fresh Fruit and Veggies)
21. Let's Go Swimming (intro)
22. Let's Go Swimming
23. The Bricklayers Song (intro)
24. The Bricklayers Song
25. Tick Tock (All Night Long) (intro)
26. Tick Tock (All Night Long)
27. Can You Dig It? (intro)
28. Can You Dig It?
29. Knead Some Dough (intro)
30. Knead Some Dough
31. Open Wide, Look Inside at the Dentist (intro)
32. Open Wide, Look Inside at the Dentist
33. Hey There Partner (intro)
34. Hey There Partner
35. Walking on the Moon (intro)
36. Walking on the Moon

== Certifications ==
Region	Certification	Certified units/sales
Australia (ARIA)	Gold	35,000^{^}
^{^} Shipments figures based on certification alone.

== Video ==
Top of the Tots
- Directed by: Paul Field
- Produced by: Paul Field
- Starring: Greg Page; Anthony Field; Murray Cook; Jeff Fatt
- Edited by: Craig Abercrombie
- Distributed by: Roadshow/ABC Video
- Release date: 10 March 2004
- Running time: 51 minutes
- Country: Australia

Top of the Tots is the 17th video by the Wiggles. It was released in 2004 by ABC Video.

=== Song list ===
1. Bow Wow Wow
2. Central Park, New York
3. Cowboys and Cowgirls
4. Fly Through the Sky
5. I Wave My Arms and Swing My Baton
6. New York Firefighter
7. Picking Flowers
8. Say Aah at the Doctors
9. Feeling Chirpy
10. Lettuce Sing (Fresh Fruit and Veggies)
11. Let's Go Swimming
12. The Bricklayers Song
13. Calling All Cows
14. Tick Tock (All Night Long)
15. Can You Dig It?
16. Knead Some Dough
17. Open Wide, Look Inside at the Dentist

=== Release ===
- Australia: 10 March 2004
- United States: 13 January 2004

=== Cast ===
The cast as presented on the videos:

The Wiggles are
- Murray Cook
- Jeff Fatt
- Anthony Field
- Greg Page

Additional Cast
- Captain Feathersword: Paul Paddick
