= Spaghetti Bolognaise and More Songs for Little Kids =

Spaghetti Bolognaise

Studio album by Peter Combe
- Released: 28 June 1985
- Recorded: 1984−85
- Genre: Children's music
- Label: ABC Music
- Producer: Peter Combe

Peter Combe chronology
Songs for Little Kids (1982)	Spaghetti Bolognaise (1985)	Toffee Apple (1987)

Spaghetti Bolognaise and More Songs for Little Kids, also known as Spaghetti Bolognaise, is the third studio album by Australian children's musician Peter Combe. It was released in June 1985 and was certified platinum in Australia in May 1993.

== Track listing ==
1. "Spaghetti Bolognaise"
2. "Jellybean Road"
3. "Mr. Clicketty Cane" (Note: Also known as Wash Your Face in Orange Juice.)
4. "When You're Feeling Crook"
5. "Rain"
6. "1 2 3 4 5"
7. "Parcel in the Post"
8. "Yes Please"
9. "I Just Love Bananas"
10. "Down in the Bathroom"
11. "In the Summertime"
12. "Phone Calls Daddy"
13. "Nutrition Blues"
14. "Mary"
15. "Tom"
16. "Thingth I Thay"
17. "Exterminate"
18. "Little Doggy"
19. "The Three Little Pigs"
20. "Sometimes I Feel"
21. "All My Silkworms"
22. "It's So Hot Today"
23. "O Little One"
- All songs composed, arranged and produced by Peter Combe.

== Certifications ==
Region	Certification	Certified units/sales
Australia (ARIA)	Platinum	70,000^{^}
^{^} Shipments figures based on certification alone.

== Release history ==
Region	Date	Format	Edition(s)	Label	Catalogue
Australia	1985	LP	Standard	ABC Records	L27124
Australia	1988	Gatefold LP	Re-release	ABC Records	836 039–1
