= Songs for Little Kids =

Studio album by Peter Combe
- Released: 5 November 1982
- Recorded: 1982
- Studio: Axent Recording Studio, Sydney
- Genre: Children's music
- Label: ABC Music
- Producer: Peter Combe

Peter Combe chronology
Vagabond (1980)	Songs for Little Kids (1982)	Spaghetti Bolognaise (1985)

Songs for Little Kids is the second studio and first children's music album by Australian musician Peter Combe. It was released in 1982 and certified gold in Australia in November 1992.

== Track listing ==
1. "Spaghetti Bolognaise" - 2:27
2. "Jennifer Wicks" - 2:14
3. "Everybody's Got a Little Rhythm" - 1:41
4. "The Put It Song" - 0:47
5. "Running On the Spot" - 1:15
6. "New Playgym" - 2:16
7. "Shake Yourself" - 1:18
8. "Thelma Brown" - 3:09
9. "Goldilocks and the Porridge" - 1:49
10. "George Cryolot Crumble" - 2:38
11. "The Billy Goat's Gruff" - 2:17
12. "Rock 'N' Roll Is All You Need" - 2:30
13. "Arms Were Made to Hug and Squeeze" - 1:38
14. "Peppercorn Tree" - 0:38
15. "Goldilocks Goldilocks" - 2:29
16. "Oscar and Mr Hairy Gorilla" - 0:30
17. "The Mixed Up Song" - 0:20
18. "Red Train" - 0:45
19. "Green, Red and Yellow" - 0:55
20. "Kangaroo, Kangaroo" - 2:23
21. "Old Wheelbarrow" - 1:08
22. "Up and Down" - 2:10
- All songs composed, arranged and produced by Peter Combe.

== Certifications ==
Region	Certification	Certified units/sales
Australia (ARIA)	Gold	35,000^{^}
^{^} Shipments figures based on certification alone.

== Release history ==
Region	Date	Format	Edition(s)	Label	Catalogue
Australia	1982	LP	Standard	ABC Records	
Australia	1988	Gatefold LP	Re-release	ABC Records	836040-1
Australia	1992	CD; cassette	Re-release	ABC Records	PKZD 4003
