= The Beanies =

Australian children's music group

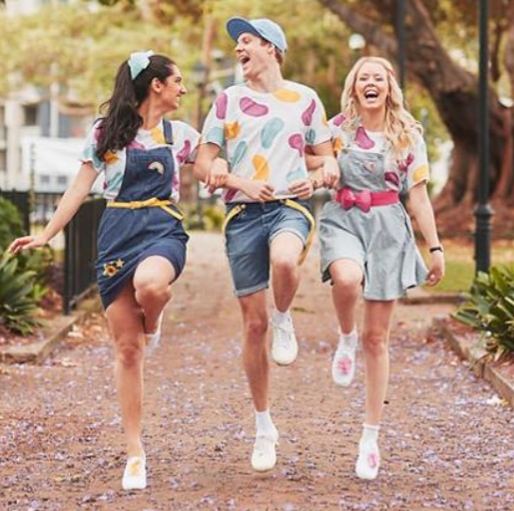
- The Beanies (from left to right: Miriam "Mim" Rizvi, Michael Yore, Laura Dawson)

Background information
- Origin: Sydney, Australia
- Genre: Children's
- Years active: 2016–2025 (on hiatus)
- Label: ABC Music
- Members: Laura Dawson; Miriam "Mim" Rizvi; Michael Yore
- Website: https://www.thebeaniesaus.com

The Beanies are an Australian children's music group, formed in 2016. The band consists of three theatre performers, Canberra-born Laura Dawson and Miriam "Mim" Rizvi, and Newcastle-born Michael Yore. The group have drawn acclaim and garnered an Australian Podcast Award for their educational podcast of the same name, with their albums garnering two ARIA nominations.

== About ==
The Beanies were formed in Sydney in 2016. As a response to the rising usage of tablets and smartphones amongst young children, the group aimed to produce Australian-made children's entertainment which encourages creativity and imagination without the use of screens. They write and produce all their own material, in collaboration with Sydney-based composer and music producer James Court.

In October 2018, The Beanies premiered their one-act musical for children, entitled The Beanies' Eggs-traordinary Day, at the Sydney Fringe Festival, which went on to tour throughout NSW, VIC, and the ACT. The group performs regularly at fairs, festivals, and community events Australia-wide, including shows at City Recital Hall and the Australia Day Sydney Children's Festival, and their episodes and songs are broadcast internationally. The trio has also been guests on ABC's Weekend Breakfast, Channel 9's Today and Weekend Today, several parenting and productivity podcasts, and at Australian podcast conference OzPod.

In early 2020, The Beanies were signed to the ABC Kids music label, who released their fourth album in April of that year. The group also began live-streaming concerts, due to live shows being postponed during the COVID-19 pandemic, and released a single called Quarantunes during that time. In July of that year, the group also moved their podcast to the Podcast One network (now LiSTNR).

The group also maintains a YouTube channel, where they release music videos, comic sketches, and concert livestreams.

== Members ==
The Beanies consists of Laura Dawson (Laura Beanie), Miriam Rizvi (Mim Beanie), and Michael Yore (Michael Beanie & Professor Know-It-All). The three also play all of the characters in the podcasts. Understudies Brendan Paul ('Brendan Beanie') and Cypriana Singh ('Cyppie Beanie') occasionally perform with the group, as does James Court as keyboardist and 'Music Wizard'.

For larger concerts, the trio perform with the 'Big Beanie Band', consisting of a revolving group of Sydney-based session musicians.

== Podcast ==
With the support of the Mamamia Podcast Network, The Beanies produced ten 15-minute podcast episodes, which were released in April 2017. A second season was confirmed soon after, with sponsorship from Kinderling Kids Radio, and was released in December 2017. Since the third season, released July 2018, the podcast has diversified into multiple separate formats:

- Story Time, including a story, a brief guided meditation (or 'brain break'), an original song, and an educational segment with 'Professor Know-It-All'.
- Show & Tell, where the trio interact with fans via voice messages and answer their questions.
- Kids News, where the group break down three of the week's top news stories for a young audience.
- Beanies Breakthroughs, standalone mini-episodes focusing on a single topic.

As of June 2023 the podcast is currently on hiatus. To date, the podcast consists of over 80 regular 'Story Time' episodes and have amassed in excess of 3 million downloads from over 30 different countries. Each episode of The Beanies podcast is written, performed, and edited entirely by The Beanies.

== Music ==
The Beanies' songs and albums are produced independently, and released on the ABC Music label. All tracks have lyrics by Dawson, Rizvi, and Yore, with music composed and produced by James Court. As of October 2022, The Beanies' songs have collectively been streamed over four million times.

Raining Jelly Beans (2016)
No.	Title	Length
1.	"It's Raining Jelly Beans"	2:00
2.	"Silly Dizzy Dance"	1:33
3.	"Opera Moo"	2:44
4.	"The Mean House"	2:05
5.	"Gee Billy! That's A Hot Chilli!"	1:46
6.	"Zigzag Stomp"	1:45
7.	"Painting Party"	3:17
8.	"There's A Fish In The Tea"	1:51
9.	"Can I Get A Milkshake On Mars?"	1:57
10.	"Boss For The Day"	1:54
11.	"Sing In Harmony"	2:40
Total length:		24:00

Imagination Station (2017)
No.	Title	Length
1.	"Power!"	2:07
2.	"Bubbles"	2:53
3.	"Jazz Shark"	2:39
4.	"New School"	2:01
5.	"Sneaky Robber"	2:45
6.	"Saturday Morning Cuddles"	3:32
7.	"My Shoes"	2:08
8.	"The Shoelace Song"	1:10
9.	"Sneezes"	1:48
10.	"Speedy Snails"	1:33
11.	"Christmas Rumba"	2:20
Total length:		25:00

Big Day Out (2018)
No.	Title	Length
1.	"Brush Your Teeth"	2:10
2.	"Seasons"	3:23
3.	"Wobble Wombat"	1:53
4.	"The Art of the Fart"	2:36
5.	"Jinx!"	2:09
6.	"Scissor, Paper, Rock!"	1:37
7.	"Dig, Dig, Dig!"	1:37
8.	"Shy Shadow"	2:21
9.	"Fingernails"	1:41
10.	"Amazing Machine"	3:37
Total length:		23:00

Full of Beans (2020)
No.	Title	Length
1.	"We're The Beanies!"	0:43
2.	"Full of Beans"	3:34
3.	"Super to Me"	3:16
4.	"Can You Get Dressed by the End of This Song?"	2:27
5.	"Puppy Love"	2:37
6.	"Push the Button"	2:14
7.	"Teeny Tiny Spider"	2:12
8.	"Rainbow"	3:53
9.	"The Escalator Challenge"	2:26
10.	"Pluto's Lament"	3:18
11.	"Why Are We Here?"	2:15
12.	"We're The Beanies! (Reprise)"	0:43
Total length:		30:00

Noise Factory (2020)
No.	Title	Length
1.	"Quarantunes"	2:48
2.	"Band-Aid Boogie"	2:01
3.	"BOAT"	2:10
4.	"Noise Factory"	2:14
5.	"Topsy Turvy Zoo"	2:20
6.	"My Secrets"	2:43
7.	"My Poor Farmer Friend"	2:55
8.	"Elderly Elephants"	2:13
9.	"Safe With Me"	4:00
10.	"Spaghetti"	2:21
Total length:		26:00

Let's Go! (2021)
No.	Title	Length
1.	"Hectik Skillz"	3:06
2.	"Buzzy Bees"	1:25
3.	"The Work Song"	2:19
4.	"I Got Bones"	2:25
5.	"Beans Are Best"	2:47
6.	"Where Does My Poo Go?"	2:19
7.	"Little Dinosaurus"	2:54
8.	"Big Kid Bike"	2:06
9.	"If I Were A Mermaid"	3:27
10.	"Groovy Train"	3:03
Total length:		26:00

The White (and Rainbow!) Album (2022)
No.	Title	Length
1.	"Professor Know It All"	3:08
2.	"I'm Ready"	2:56
3.	"Beanie Bathtime"	3:39
4.	"Fancy Cat"	2:35
5.	"Very Impressive Trickeridoos"	3:06
6.	"Sorry"	3:01
7.	"Unicorns"	2:54
8.	"Being Kind"	2:06
9.	"Michael's Song (My Cool Song)"	2:46
10.	"Brick One, Brick Two"	2:59
Total length:		29:00

Wellness for Kids EP (2020)
No.	Title	Length
1.	"Meditation for Kids"	2:56
2.	"I Feel My Feelings"	3:17
3.	"Stretch, Rest, Breathe, Flow"	4:26
Total length:		11:00

Silly Songs for Smarty-Pantses (2023)
No.	Title	Length
1.	"Don't Sing Along"	2:58
2.	"Wave Your Flowers in the Air"	3:07
3.	"Champion of the World of Champions"	3:22
4.	"Rock and Rollin' Around This Rock"	2:39
5.	"Sportsball"	2:35
6.	"The Music Wizard"	2:51
7.	"Cloudwatching"	3:36
8.	"Happy Holiday"	3:05
9.	"Turtle"	3:07
10.	"Funky Feet"	2:35
11.	"Basically Cinderella"	2:34
12.	"Goodbye Sun, Hello Moon"	3:34
Total length:		36:00

== Awards and nominations ==
=== AIR Awards ===
The Australian Independent Record Awards (commonly known informally as AIR Awards) is an annual awards night to recognise, promote and celebrate the success of Australia's Independent Music sector.

Year	Nominee / work	Award	Result	Ref.
2022	Let's Go!	Best Independent Children's Album or EP	Nominated	

=== ARIA Awards ===
Year	Nominated works	Award	Result	Ref.
2019	Imagination Station	Best Children's Album	Nominated	
2022	Let's Go!	Best Children's Album	Nominated	

=== Australian Podcast Awards ===
Year	Nominated works	Award	Result	Ref.
2018	The Beanies	Best Family & Kids Podcast	Won	
2019	The Beanies	Best Family & Kids Podcast	Nominated	

=== MMMA Awards ===
Year	Nominated works	Award	Result	Ref.
2022	Let's Go!	Album of the Year	Won	
