= Newspaper Mama =

- original artwork

Studio album by Peter Combe
- Released: November 1988
- Recorded: 1988
- Studio: Axent & ABC Studios, Sydney
- Genre: Children's music
- Label: ABC Music
- Producer: Peter Combe

Peter Combe chronology
| Toffee Apple (1987) | Newspaper Mama (1988) | Chopsticks (1989) |

Newspaper Mama is the fifth studio album by Australian children's musician Peter Combe. It was released in November 1988 and was certified gold in Australia in June 1989.

At the ARIA Music Awards of 1989, the album won the ARIA Award for Best Children's Album, Combe's second consecutive win.

== Track listing ==
1. "Newspaper Mama"
2. "Six Juicy Apples"
3. "Blow Out the Candles"
4. "Happy As Larry"
5. "Edward J Fox"
6. "Syntax Error"
7. "All Good Things"
8. "The Front of Me"
9. "Hammer in the Nails"
10. "Australia Hooray"
11. "Yellow Banana"
12. "Chish and Fips"
13. "Walking Encyclopaedia"
14. "Spangle Road"
15. "Tell Me the Ti-i-ime Please"
16. "First Reader"
17. "Chops and Sausages"
18. "Snow White and Prince"
19. "Robin Hood's Dream"
- All songs composed, arranged and produced by Peter Combe.

== Certifications ==
| Region | Certification | Certified units/sales |
|---|---|---|
| Australia (ARIA) | Gold | 35,000^{^} |
^{^} Shipments figures based on certification alone.

== Release history ==
| Region | Date | Format | Edition(s) | Label | Catalogue |
|---|---|---|---|---|---|
| Australia | 1988 | LP; cassette | Standard | ABC Records | L28021 / C28021 |
| Australia | 1988 | Gatefold LP | Re-release | ABC Records | 836038-1 |
