= The Wayfarers =

- Origin: Brisbane, Queensland
- Genres: Folk
- Years active: 1960s –
- Members: Stan Arthur; Aubrey Beggs; Martin Beggs; Theo Bosch; Ian Clarke; Mike Clarke; Hugh Curtis; Jan Davis; Sue Edmunds; Ken Evans; Alistair Frazer; Martin Gallagher; Peter Greenwood; Billy Hillhouse; Charlie Kelly; Alan Knox; Geoff Ludowyk; Tony Miles; Don Nichols; Lionel O'Keefe; Ross Roache; Stuart Roache; Keith Ross; Bob Stewart; Gary Tooth; Sue Whighton; Brian Whitlow; Dave Worthington

The Wayfarers is an Australian folk band. Their album Home Among The Gum Trees – Songs For Aussie Kids was nominated for the ARIA Award for Best Children's Album in 1989.

== Discography ==
=== Albums ===
- The Barley Mow (1966) – Waymark
- The Mighty Men of Mt. Isa (1973) 1. The Isa Rodeo 2. The Hitch-Hiker
- An Hour of Aussie Singalong Favourites (1987) – Music World
- Home Among The Gum Trees – Songs For Aussie Kids (1988) – Trans Tasman Productions
- The First 200 Years (1988) – Trans Tasman Productions
- The Great Aussie Barbie Party (1990) – Music World
- Ave a Beer (1991) – Hughes Leisure Group
- Another Aussie Singalong Party (1992) – Hughes Leisure Group
- 20 Aussie Animal Songs (1993) – Hughes Leisure Group

== Awards and nominations ==
=== ARIA Music Awards ===
Year	Nominated works	Award	Result
1989	Home Among The Gum Trees – Songs For Aussie Kids	Best Children's Album	Nominated
