= Van-Anh Nguyen =

Australian classical pianist

- Born: 21 November 1987 (age 38); Sydney, Australia
- Genres: Classical music
- Instrument: Piano
- Website: www.vananhofficial.com

Van-Anh Nguyen (born 21 November 1987) is an Australian classical pianist. She was nominated for the ARIA Award for Best Children's Album. She was nominated for the 2022 ARIA Awards for Children's Album for her album The Princess and the Piano. Her 2020 album Peaceful Piano Essentials reached number one on the Aria Classical Album Charts. She lives in Los Angeles, United States.

== Career ==
Born in Sydney to professional Vietnamese musicians who fled to Australia in 1983, Nguyen began learning piano when she was 15 months old. She was accepted into the Young Artists Program at the Sydney Conservatorium when she was four years old and obtained her Associate Diploma in Music at the age of nine, and the Licentiate Diploma when she was twelve. She first played at the Sydney Opera House when she was eight, in an event that aimed to raise awareness of refugees. Nguyen graduated from The Hills Grammar School in Sydney before completing a Diploma in Performance (piano) at the University of Sydney and a Bachelor of Media (Writing) at Macquarie University.

In 2008, Nguyen accepted the role as ambassador for Heart Reach Australia

In 2014, she joined Discovery Channel as the host of a music travel show, 'Philippines In-Sync'.

In 2018, Nguyen was signed to Universal Music.

She has performed in renowned concert halls, including the Sydney Opera House, Segerstrom Centre for the Arts (United States), Herbst Theatre (United States), and Forbidden City Concert Hall (China).

In 2019, she created "Double Touch", a hybrid electronic collaboration with Australian DJ/Drummer/Producer, Mark Olsen. Their style has been described as a "unique dreamy mix of acoustic and electro sounds". They have performed at festivals and venues across the world, including All Day I Dream Festival (California, USA), Scorpios (Mykonos, Greece), Cova Santa (Ibiza, Spain), Return to Rio Festival (Australia), Cloud 9 (Fiji), Glow Rooftop (Vietnam), and Omnia Bali (Indonesia).

== Discography ==
=== Albums ===
List of albums, with selected details
Title	Details
Mise-en-scene	Released: 2008; Format: Label:
Tonalita	Released: 2012; Format: Label:
Crossfire (with Chris Howlett)	Released: 2016; Format: Label:
Pop Alchemy	Released: 2018; Format: CD, digital; Label: Decca Records
Virtuoso Meets Soul EP (with Ronee Martin)	Released: 2019; Format: Label:
Peaceful Piano Essentials	Released: 2020; Format: CD, digital; Label:
Disney on Piano	Released: 2021; Format: Digital
The Princess and the Piano	Released: 2021; Format: CD, Vinyl, digital; Label: Decca Classics

== Awards and nominations ==
=== ARIA Music Awards ===
The ARIA Music Awards are presented annually from 1987 by the Australian Recording Industry Association (ARIA).

Year	Nominee / work	Award	Result	Ref.
2022	The Princess and the Piano	Best Children's Album	Nominated	
