= The Hooley Dooleys =

Children's Musical Group

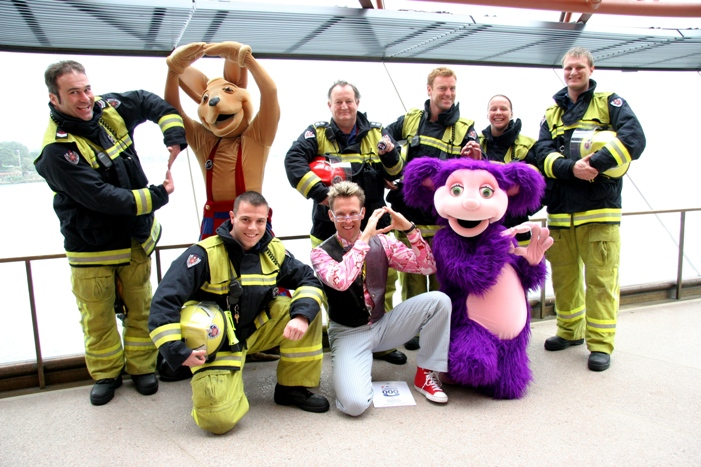
- Members of the Hooley Dooleys with firefighters of Fire and Rescue NSW in 2007

Background information
- Origin: Sydney, New South Wales, Australia
- Genre: Children's
- Years active: 1996–2009
- Labels: ABC, ABC Music, EMI, Warner Bros. Records, Warner Bros.
- Past members: David Butts; Bruce Thorburn; Antoine Demarest

The Hooley Dooleys were an Australian children's music and performance act which began in 1996. Their material was aimed at children between the ages of two and seven. They originally appeared on the Australian Broadcasting Corporation (ABC), but then appeared on commercial television and as a live touring act. Early members of the group were David Butts, Antoine Demarest and Bruce Thorburn; director and producer was Jacqueline Cairns; and the early childhood advisor was Angela McLean.

By 1998, the group was directed and produced by Jane Davidson. In November that year David Brearly of The Australian reported that there were hostilities between management and the entertainers regarding marketing and conflict of interests.

At the ARIA Music Awards of 1999 their fourth studio album, Pop!, won the Best Children's Album trophy. The group was nominated in the same category in seven other years.

By 2000, their producer and director was Colin Bromley, and, by 2004, Thorburn had left the group with Butts and Demarest set to continue. In June 2006, they ended their association with the ABC, and entered into a new distribution deal with Warner Bros.

For their 2006 material, additional voices were provided by Kirsten Butts – wife of David Butts – and Mal Heap; they were produced by Jill Coleburn, and directed by Missy Stephens-Gaha. In February 2007 The Australian's Michael Bodey and Jim Gaines described how The Hooley Dooleys had "broken free in contentious circumstances", the group had been restricted at the ABC to "merely bit players below the [network's] premier suite of money-spinners, The Wiggles, Bananas in Pyjamas and Play School". The group planned to enhance their associated characters: Tickle the Doodat, to promote tolerance; Russell the Muscley Kangaroo, (health and fitness); Penelope Perfect (creativity); and Captain Catastrophe (safety).

By 2008, Butts was the only original member of the group which consisted of seven performers. New characters were Lou Lou, Katie, Adam and Ginner, which joined Tickle, Russell and Captain. The ensemble toured rural New South Wales in July 2009, however The Hooley Dooleys disbanded later that year.

== Cast ==
=== Original members ===
- David Butts, (b. 6 August 1961) Blue – saxophone, keyboards, guitar, vocals, songwriter, producer (1996–2009)
  - As of August 2008, Butts was married to his wife, Kirsten and the couple had four children. He also had a daughter from a previous relationship. He had studied at Sydney Conservatorium of Music and then worked as a music teacher before forming The Hooley Dooleys in 1996.
- Antoine Demarest, (b. 8 November 1972) Red – trombone, keyboards, guitar, vocals, songwriter, producer (1996–2006)
  - As of April 2003, Demarest and his wife, Jane, had a daughter named Tara.
  - Since having been in the Hooley Dooleys, Demarest had been actively continuing a music career including later forming a new group with Bruce Thorburn called Loop De Loop and even releasing his own album called Ant-1 in 2013.
- Bruce Thorburn, (b. 10 February 1960) Yellow – violin, keyboards, guitar, vocals, songwriter, producer (1996–2003)
  - As of April 2003, Thorburn and his wife, Mandy, had three children - twin daughters Ella and Ruby and son Oscar.
  - Since having left the Hooley Dooleys, Thorburn would later reunite with Antoine Demarest in forming a new comedy group called Loop De Loop.

=== Other characters ===
- Russell the Muscley Kangaroo – (1996–2009)
- Tickle the Doodat – (1997–2009)
- Chalk and Cheese the Cockatoos – (2002)
- Poss the Possum – (2002–2005)
- Captain Catastrophe – (2004–2009)
- Penelope Perfect – (2004–2006)
- Lou Lou – (2007–2008)
- Katie – (2007–2008)
- Adam – (2007–2008)
- Ginner – (2007–2008)

== Awards ==
=== ARIA Music Awards ===
| Year | Nominated works | Award | Result |
|---|---|---|---|
| 1997 | Splash | Best Children's Album | Nominated |
| 1998 | Ready Set... Go! | Best Children's Album | Nominated |
| 1999 | Pop! | Best Children's Album | Won |
| 2001 | Keep on Dancing | Best Children's Album | Nominated |
| 2002 | Roll Up! Roll Up! | Best Children's Album | Nominated |
| 2004 | Wonderful | Best Children's Album | Nominated |
| 2005 | Super Dooper | Best Children's Album | Nominated |
| 2006 | Smile | Best Children's Album | Nominated |

=== APRA Music Awards ===
| Year | Nominated works | Award | Result |
|---|---|---|---|
| 1996 | The Hooley Dooleys | Most Performed Children's Work | Nominated |
| 1999 | Ooga Chuga (In The Jungle) | Most Performed Children's Work | Nominated |

== Albums ==
- The Hooley Dooleys (1996)
- Splash (1997)
- Ready, Set... Go! (1998)
- Pop! (1999)
- Keep on Dancing (2000)
- Roll Up! Roll Up! (2001)
- Oopsadazee (2002)
- Wonderful (2003)
- Super Dooper (2004)
- Smile (2005)

== Videography ==
- The Hooley Dooleys (1997)
- Ready, Set... Go (1998)
- Pop! (1999)
- Keep on Dancing (2000)
- Roll Up! Roll Up! (2001)
- The Hooley Dooleys to the Rescue (2002)
- Oopsadazee (2002)
- Wonderful (2003)
- All Together Now (2004)
- Super Dooper (2004)
- At the Farm (2005)
- How 2 Exercise (2006)
- How 2 Go to School (2006)
- How 2 Give at Christmas (2006)

== See also ==
- The Wiggles
- Hi-5
