= The Absolutely Very Best of Peter Combe (So Far) Recorded in Concert =

Live album by Peter Combe
- Released: April 1991
- Recorded: 1990
- Venue: ABC Studios, Collinswood, Adelaide, South Australia
- Genre: Children's music
- Label: ABC Music
- Producer: Peter Combe

Peter Combe chronology
Peter Combe's Christmas Album (1990)	The Absolutely Very Best of Peter Combe (So Far) Recorded in Concert (1991)	Snugglepot and Cuddlepie (1993)

The Absolutely Very Best of Peter Combe (So Far) Recorded in Concert' is the first live album by Australian children's musician Peter Combe. It was recorded in 1990 and released in April 1991 and peaked at number 69 on the ARIA Charts. The album was certified gold in December 1991.

At the ARIA Music Awards of 1992, the album won the ARIA Award for Best Children's Album; the third time Combe has won this award.

== Track listing ==
1. "This Little Pig" - 3:53
2. "Spangle Road" - 2:38
3. "Jeffrey Hill" - 2:45
4. "Thelma Brown" - 3:25
5. "The Put It Song" - 2:03
6. "Rain" - 3:02
7. "Rock 'n' Roll Is All You Need" - 2:19
8. "Lullaby (For Tom)" - 2:11
9. "Tadpole Blues" - 3:17
10. "Down in the Bathroom" - 5:36
11. "Toffee Apple" - 2:40
12. "Music of the Day" - 3:31
13. "Saturday Night" - 2:22
14. "Tell Me The Ti-i-ime Please" - 3:47
15. "Cats" - 2:17
16. "Chopsticks" - 2:57
17. "Jack and the Beanstalk" - 3:22
18. "Cast Away" - 2:22
19. "Happy As Larry" - 2:44
20. "Mr. Clicketty Cane" - 2:46
21. "Spaghetti Bolognaise" - 2:31
22. "Juicy, Juicy Green Grass (A Sheep's Lament)" - 2:56
23. "Newspaper Mama" - 4:26
- All songs composed, arranged and produced by Peter Combe.

== Charts ==
Chart (1991)	Peak position
Australia (ARIA Charts)	69

== Certifications ==
Region	Certification	Certified units/sales
Australia (ARIA)	Gold	35,000^{^}
^{^} Shipments figures based on certification alone.

== Release history ==
Region	Date	Format	Edition(s)	Label	Catalogue
Australia	April 1991	CD	Standard	ABC Records	846993-2
Australia	2000	CD	re-release as Live and Rocking	Rascal Records	
