= Peter Combe's Christmas Album =

Studio album by Peter Combe
- Released: November 1990
- Recorded: 1990
- Studio: Axent & ABC Studios, Sydney
- Genre: Children's music, Christmas music
- Label: ABC Music
- Producer: Peter Combe

Peter Combe chronology
Chopsticks (1989)	Peter Combe's Christmas Album (1990)	The Absolutely Very Best of Peter Combe (So Far) Recorded in Concert (1991)

Peter Combe's Christmas Album is the seventh studio and first Christmas music album by Australian children's musician Peter Combe. It was released in November 1990 and peaked at number 49 on the ARIA Charts, becoming Combe's highest charting album. The album was certified gold in December 1990.

== Track listing ==
1. "Happy Christmas to You"
2. "Christmas Eve"
3. "Tell Me the Story"
4. "Star Shines Bright"
5. "Baby Lying in a Manger"
6. "Chock a Block (The Inn Keeper's Song)"
7. "Rejoice Rejoice"
8. "Hang Up Your Stocking"
9. "Christmas Is Coming"
10. "To You Merry Christmas"
11. "Love & Joy"
12. "Caesar's Decree Song"
13. "Ping"
14. "O Little One"
15. "Fear Not for I"
16. "Christmas Child"
17. "Christmas Is Coming"
- All songs composed, arranged and produced by Peter Combe.

== Charts ==
=== Weekly charts ===
Chart (1990/91)	Peak position
Australian Albums (ARIA)	49

=== Year end charts ===
Chart (1990)	Rank
Australian Albums Chart	89

== Certifications ==
Region	Certification	Certified units/sales
Australia (ARIA)	Gold	35,000^{^}
^{^} Shipments figures based on certification alone.

== Release history ==
Region	Date	Format	Edition(s)	Label	Catalogue
Australia	November 1990	CD; LP	Standard	ABC Records	846597-1/ 846597-2
Australia	1999	CD	Re-release	Rascal Records	RASC06-2
