= Peter Combe =

Peter Combe OAM
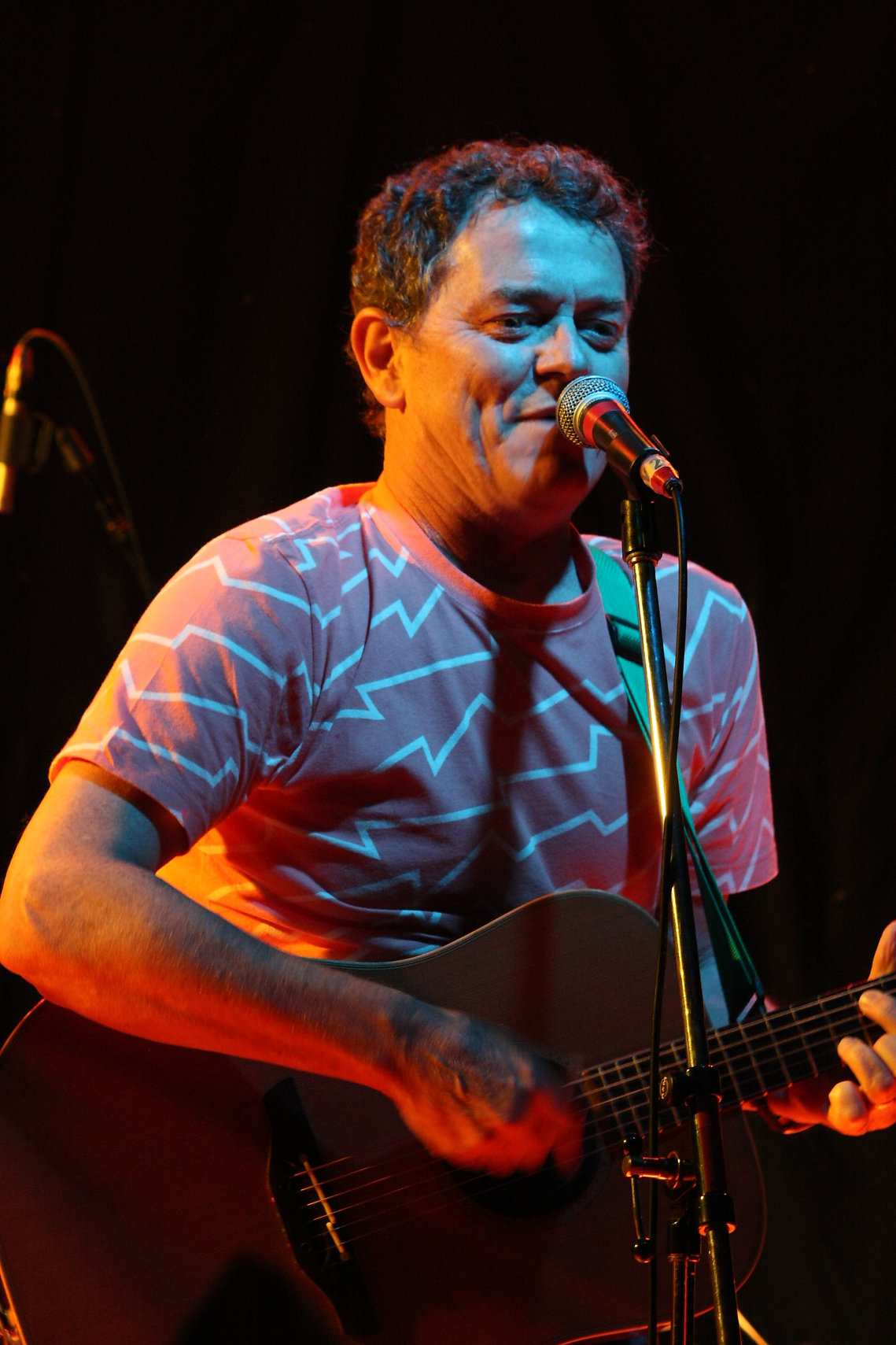
- Combe performing in July 2008

Background information
- Born: Peter Charles Combe; 20 October 1948 (age 77); Adelaide, South Australia, Australia
- Genre: Children's
- Occupations: Entertainer, musician
- Instruments: Vocals; acoustic guitar; piano; ukulele
- Years active: 1969–present
- Labels: ABC, Rascal Records
- Website: petercombe.com

Peter Charles Combe OAM (/ˈkuːm/; born 20 October 1948) is an Australian children's entertainer and musician. At the ARIA Music Awards he has won three ARIA Awards for Best Children's Album, for Toffee Apple (1988), Newspaper Mama (1989) and The Absolutely Very Best of Peter Combe (So Far) Recorded in Concert (1992) and four additional nominations (Chopsticks (1990), Little Groover (1996), Live It Up (2017) and Planet Earth 3rd from the Sun (2023)). His best-known tracks are "Toffee Apple", "Spaghetti Bolognaise", "Mr Clicketty Cane", "Juicy Juicy Green Grass" and "Newspaper Mama". His Christmas Album (November 1990) reached the ARIA Albums Chart top 50.

== Early life ==
Peter Charles Combe was born in Adelaide on 20 October 1948 to Merle (née Holman) and Bern Combe, the third of four children. His early influences from the 1950s were the Springfields; he learned to harmonise from an early age. He was inspired by folk singers of the 1960s, including Peter, Paul and Mary, Simon & Garfunkel, Joni Mitchell and Bob Dylan. He formed a folk group and taught himself guitar. Later he became fascinated by the Beatles and Billy Joel.

== Career ==
=== Early career ===
By 1969, Combe was a primary school teacher and in the early 1970s, he was a specialist music teacher. He taught junior school music at Prince Alfred College in the late 1970s. He started writing songs for his students and in 1973 he wrote his first "operettas" for them. One of the early ones, Bows Against the Barons, is based on Geoffrey Trease's novel of the same name, relating the legend of Robin Hood. The song, "Robin Hood's Dream", appeared on his 1988 album, Newspaper Mama.

In 1975, Combe moved to Sydney and aspired to be the next Paul Simon. There he appeared in the rock musical, Sergeant Pepper's Lonely Hearts Club. He taught at inner Sydney primary schools, performed in pubs and clubs as a singer-songwriter. He wrote a children's musical, Frederick WhatsHisName & his TwoLegged Six String Guitar, which provided the track, "Spangle Road". Another of his musicals is based on Norman Lindsay's book, The Magic Pudding.

In 1977, Combe migrated to England where he became a presenter on Music Time, a BBC Television educational program. He explained that "Someone in Adelaide had given me the name of a BBC producer. I rang and said I had just arrived [in England] and do you have any shows I can audition for. They wanted someone for Music Time, I auditioned, made the short list and got the job." Combe and co-presenter, Kathryn Harries, introduced musical concepts in an entertaining format. The show was used by teachers as part of their music programs and was a resource for other music educators. Besides being played in Britain for six years, it was re-broadcast on ABC TV. In late 1979, the Combe family moved back to Australia, where he presented Let's Have Music, an Australian Broadcasting Corporation (ABC) radio program, which was used for primary school music education.

=== 1980–1992: Commercial success ===
In 1980, he recorded his first album, Vagabond, which was aimed at adults. The title track had been recorded by ex-pat Australians, the Seekers, in 1977. After two more years teaching, Combe issued his second album, Songs for Little Kids. It was recorded and produced by Combe at Axent Recording Studio in Sydney and appeared on ABC Records on cassette.

At that time, children's albums comprised nursery rhymes, which were sung and played in a simple traditional style. Combe recalled, "record companies used to think anyone could write songs for children, anything was good enough. You would get whole albums where the only accompaniment was acoustic guitar." Combe introduced new concepts in children's songs, writing to appeal to children and their parents: they were funny and relevant. He arranged them with contemporary instrumentation, using his Music Time experience to introduce children to different musical concepts, genres and instruments. Combe started performing concerts in schools – about 200 school shows a year over three years. His next cassette, Spaghetti Bolognaise and More Songs for Little Kids (1985), was soon renamed as Spaghetti Bolognaise after its lead track.

In 1986, he returned to England for an eight-month stay – he wrote material for his next album, Toffee Apple (June 1987). Back in Australia he met Diana Manson, then the head of ABC Music, and they worked on the first ever children's music video filmed in Australia – "Toffee Apple" – to promote the new album. The music video was played during children's programming on ABC TV, and helped established Combe as Australia's first kids' pop star: he was referred to as King of the Kids. At the ARIA Music Awards of 1988 Combe won the inaugural ARIA Award for Best Children's Album category for Toffee Apple.

In 1989, he won his second ARIA for Best Children's Album, for Newspaper Mama (1988). The Canberra Times correspondent described him as "the master of loony tunes for kids"; with this album having "a selection of original songs with the title track accompanied by an imaginative video." His next album, Chopsticks (September 1989), was also nominated in that category in the following year but it did not win. Peter Combe's Christmas Album (November 1990) reached the ARIA Albums Chart top 50. His first live album, The Absolutely Very Best of Peter Combe (So Far) Recorded in Concert (1991), won his third trophy for Best Children's Album, in 1992.

Touring highlights were selling out the Sydney Opera House (twice) and the Melbourne Concert Hall, Carols in the Domain in Sydney, Carols nights in Brisbane, Adelaide and Hobart, filming Christmas Under the Stars at the Adelaide Festival Centre, Family Concerts with the Adelaide Symphony Orchestra at the Festival Theatre and Entertainment Centre – plus numerous television appearances and radio interviews. Combe's albums have received 7 gold and 3 platinum accreditations.

From 1989 to 1991, Peter presented another radio program, Ticklepot, on ABC Radio National. His co-presenter Henry Salter played the part of Monkey, and the 10-minute program followed the adventures of Peter and Monkey through songs and stories. In all, 420 programs went to air over a period of 3 years. Ticklepot was voted best children's radio program in the world in New York in 1991.

=== 1993–present: Continued success ===
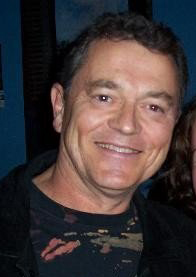
Combe in Adelaide, 2005

In 1993, Peter's musical version of May Gibbs' classic book "Snugglepot & Cuddlepie", was performed in the Adelaide Festival of Arts. This was originally performed as a cantata with orchestra, choirs and soloists. It was reproduced the following year in the Adelaide Festival Theatre with the Adelaide Symphony Orchestra – and this was recorded and is still available on CD. There have been many subsequent performances around Australia, some as a cantata and others with an accompanying script.

Further albums of new songs were to follow Spook (1993), Little Groover (1996), Best Friends (1999), plus some picture books with CD by Scholastic – Wash Your Face in Orange Juice and Juicy Juicy Green Grass.

From 2003 to 2006, Combe read and sang a number of classic fairy tales. These were released on CD as Classic Fairy Tales, Classic Fairy Tales Vol 2 and Classic Fairy Tales Vol 3.

In 2006, he crossed over to the genre of political commentary with his song "Free David Hicks".

Since 2005, Combe has started playing pub gigs around Australia aimed at young adults who grew up listening to his music. A clip of the live performance at the Corner Hotel in Melbourne is available showing a crowd of young adults singing along to lyrics such as "Wash Your Face in Orange Juice", and "Belly Flop on a Pizza? Ewww!".

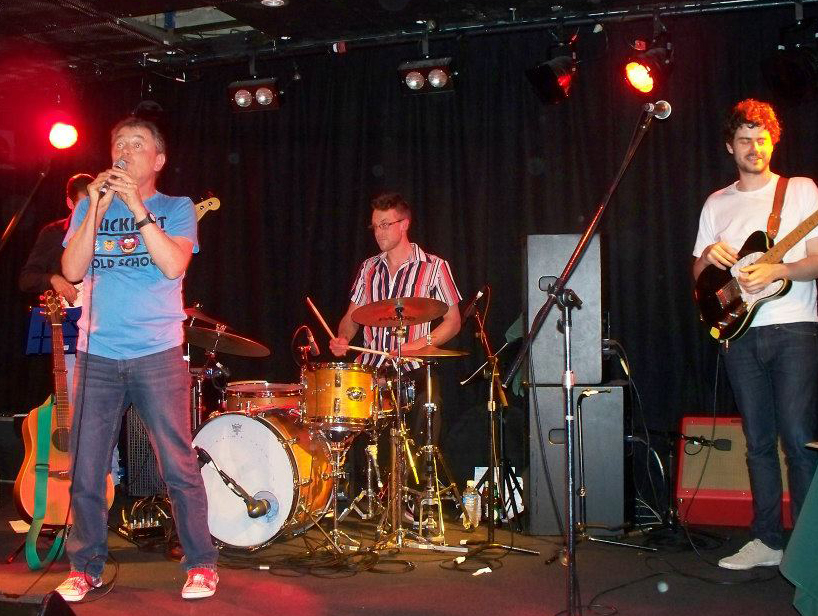
Combe performs his classic songs to an audience of adults in 2012 during a pub show in Melbourne.

Live It Up, was released on 6 April 2017. Combe toured the album across Australia

In 2018, Combe performed his 1990 Peter Combe's Christmas Album in full across the country in a national tour.

== Personal life ==
Combe resides in Adelaide, South Australia and spends time at his holiday house in Carrickalinga.

Combe and his wife Carol have four children - a son and three daughters - who have all performed with him over the years: Joni (Note: From 1995 to 2000, Joni was the presenter of Nine Network television series Here's Humphrey, then she played the role of Rhapsody in all three home videos (The Fairies/Fairy Hello!, A Fairy Merry Christmas and Farmyard Magic) and four of the albums (The Fairies, A Fairy Merry Christmas, Farmyard Magic and A Magical Fairy Party) of The Fairies. Both of the shows were filmed in Adelaide.), Alice, Emily and Thomas 'Thom' (Note: Emily and Thomas performed together in the band The Finishing School.); and seven grandchildren.

Growing up, Combe's father would wake him up at 6am to play tennis and he admits he's quite a good player.

Combe's favourite artists are Bob Dylan, Peter, Paul and Mary and The Springfields.

== Discography ==
=== Studio albums ===
List of studio albums, with release date, Australian chart position and certification
Title	Album details	Peak chart positions	Certification
Title	Album details	AUS	Certification
Vagabond	Released: 1980; Label: Peter Combe (PC 106); Format: LP	-	
Songs for Little Kids	Released: 1982; Label: ABC Music; Format: LP	-	ARIA: Gold
Spaghetti Bolognaise	Released: 1985; Label: ABC Music (L 27124); Format: LP	-	ARIA: Platinum
Toffee Apple	Released: June 1987; Label: ABC Music (L 27206); Format: LP, Cassette, CD	86	ARIA: Platinum
Newspaper Mama	Released: 1988; Label: ABC Music (L 28021); Format: LP, Cassette, CD	-	ARIA: Gold
Chopsticks	Released: September 1989; Label: ABC Music (838416-2); Format: CD, LP, Cassette	-	ARIA: Gold
Peter Combe's Christmas Album	Released: November 1990; Label: ABC Music (846597-2); Format: CD, LP, Cassette	49	ARIA: Gold
Spook	Released: 1993; Label: Rascal Records; Format: CD, Cassette	-	
Little Groover	Released: 1996; Label: Rascal Records (RASC04-2); Format: CD, Cassette	-	
Best Friends	Released: 1999; Label: Rascal Records; Format: CD	-	
Songs from a Telephone Box	Released: 2002; Label: Rascal Records; Format: CD, Digital download	-	
Re-invented	Released: 2003; Label: Rascal Records; Format: CD, Digital download	-	
Classic Fairy Tales	Released: 2003; Label: Bolinda Audio; Format: CD	-	
Classic Fairy Tales Volume 2	Released: 2004; Label: Bolinda Audio; Format: CD	-	
Wake Up It's Christmas	Released: October 2005; Label: Rascal Records; Format: CD, Digital download	-	
Classic Fairy Tales Volume 3	Released: 2006; Label: Bolinda Audio; Format: CD	-	
Kiddywinks	Released: 2009; Label: Peter Combe; Format: CD, digital download	-	
Quirky Berserky (The Turkey from Turkey)	Released: March 2012; Label: Peter Combe; Format: CD, digital download	-	
Live It Up	Released: May 2017; Label: Peter Combe; Format: CD, digital download, streaming	-	
Planet Earth: 3rd from the Sun	Released: September 2023; Label: Peter Combe, MGM; Format: CD, digital download, streaming	-	
A Frog in My Cheese Sandwich	Released: August 2024; Label: Peter Combe, MGM; Format: CD, digital download, streaming	-	

=== Live albums ===
List of live albums, with release date, Australian chart position and certification
Title	Album details	Peak chart positions	Certification
Title	Album details	AUS	Certification
The Absolutely Very Best of Peter Combe (So Far) Recorded in Concert	Released: April 1991; Label: ABC Music (846993-2); Format: CD, Cassette; Notes: Recorded at ABC Studios, Adelaide 1990	69	ARIA: Gold
Snugglepot and Cuddlepie: The Musical - In Concert	Released: 1993; Label: Rascal Records; Format: CD, Cassette; Notes: Recorded at the Adelaide Festival Theatre, March 1993	-	
Live at Jive	Released: 2008; Label: Peter Combe; Format: CD+DVD, Digital Download; Notes: Recorded at Jive, Adelaide, April 2008	-	

=== Compilation albums ===
List of compilation albums, with release dates
Title	Album details
Greatest Hits	Released: 1994; Label: Rascal Records; Format: CD, Cassette
Wash your Face in Orange Juice	Released: 2003; Label: Rascal Records; Format: CD
Moovy Groovy Songs	Released: 2009; Label: Peter Combe; Format: Digital download
Munchy Crunchy Songs	Released: July 2013; Label: Peter Combe; Format: CD, Digital download, streaming

=== Box sets ===
List of box sets, with release dates and details
Title	Album details
Triple Pack	Released: 2006; Label: Peter Combe; Format: 3x CD; Featuring Toffee Apple, Spaghetti Bolognaise & Newspaper Mama
Triple Pack 2	Released: 2007; Label: Peter Combe; Format: 3x CD; Featuring: Live & Rocking, Little Groover & Best Friends
Triple Pack 3	Released: 2008; Label: Peter Combe; Format: 3x CD; Featuring: Wash Your Face in Orange Juice, Chopsticks & Spook
Christmas Triple Pack	Released: 2015; Label: Peter Combe; Format: 3x CD; Featuring: Peter Combe's Christmas Album, Wake Up It's Christmas & Backing Tracks (Backing Tracks is instrumental tracks from Peter Combe's Christmas Album & Wake Up It's Christmas)

== Awards and nominations ==
=== APRA Music Awards ===
The APRA Awards are held in Australia and New Zealand by the Australasian Performing Right Association to recognise songwriting skills, sales and airplay performance by its members annually.

Year	Nominated works	Award	Result	Ref
1998	"Honey"	Most Performed Children's Work	Nominated	
1998	"Thingth I Thay"	Most Performed Children's Work	Nominated	

=== ARIA Music Awards ===
The ARIA Music Awards is an annual awards ceremony that recognises excellence, innovation, and achievement across all genres of Australian music.

Year	Nominated works	Award	Result
1988	Toffee Apple	Best Children's Album	Won
1989	Newspaper Mama	Best Children's Album	Won
1990	Chopsticks	Best Children's Album	Nominated
1992	The Absolutely Very Best of Peter Combe (So Far) Recorded in Concert	Best Children's Album	Won
1996	Little Groover	Best Children's Album	Nominated
2017	Live It Up	Best Children's Album	Nominated
2023	Planet Earth 3rd from the Sun	Best Children's Album	Nominated
