= Chopsticks (album) =

Studio album by Peter Combe
- Released: September 1989
- Recorded: 1989
- Studio: Axent & ABC Studios, Sydney
- Genre: Children's music
- Label: ABC Music
- Producer: Peter Combe

Peter Combe chronology
| Newspaper Mama (1988) | Chopsticks (1989) | Peter Combe's Christmas Album (1990) |

Chopsticks is the sixth studio album by Australian children's musician Peter Combe. It was released in September 1989 and was certified gold in Australia in August 1991.

At the ARIA Music Awards of 1990, the album was nominated for the ARIA Award for Best Children's Album.

== Track listing ==
1. "Chopsticks"
2. "This Little Pig"
3. "Wriggle & Roll"
4. "9999"
5. "Saturday Night"
6. "Fishy O Fishy"
7. "Made Ya Look Ya Dirty Chook"
8. "River River"
9. "Springtime of Our Dreams"
10. "Hey Ho Jerry O"
11. "Humpty Dumpty's Other Song"
12. "The Pied Piper of Hamelin"
13. "Hadrian's Wall"
14. "Look After Yourself"
15. "Cast Away" (Note: This track is only included on the CD version of the album.)
16. "Stuck in a Pizza"
17. "Fear Not for I"
18. "Reprise"
- All songs composed, arranged and produced by Peter Combe.

== Certifications ==
| Region | Certification | Certified units/sales |
|---|---|---|
| Australia (ARIA) | Gold | 35,000^{^} |
^{^} Shipments figures based on certification alone.

== Release history ==
| Region | Date | Format | Label | Catalogue |
|---|---|---|---|---|
| Australia | 1989 | LP; CD; cassette | ABC Records | 838416-1 /838416-2 /838416-4 |
