= Fay White (singer) =

- Label: Move Records
- Website: faywhitemusic.com

Fay White is an Australian singer, songwriter and community facilitator. Her album Did You See the Wind Today? was nominated for the ARIA Award for Best Children's Album in 1989.

== Discography ==
- Timshel (1979)
- Sink or Sing (1983)
- Did You See the Wind Today? (1988) - Move Records
- Trees Stars and Other Wonders (1988)
- Soil Ain't Dirt (1989)
- Singing Landcare
- These People, This Place: everyday grace (2011)

Fay White, Family & Friends

- A Gift To Be Simple
- Sweet Journey

Fay White and Jane Thompson

- Songs with Legs

== Awards and nominations ==
=== ARIA Music Awards ===
Year	Nominated works	Award	Result
1989	Did You See the Wind Today?	Best Children's Album	Nominated
