= Toffee Apple =

Studio album by Peter Combe
- Released: 12 June 1987
- Recorded: 1986
- Studio: Axent Studios, Sydney
- Genre: Children's music
- Label: ABC Music
- Producer: Peter Combe

Peter Combe chronology
| Spaghetti Bolognaise (1985) | Toffee Apple (1987) | Newspaper Mama (1988) |

Toffee Apple is the fourth studio album by Australian musical artist, Peter Combe. It was released in June 1987 and peaked at number 86 on the Kent Music Report and was certified platinum in Australia in December 1989.

At the ARIA Music Awards of 1988, the album won the ARIA Award for Best Children's Album.

== Track listing ==
1. "Juicy Juicy Green Grass (A Sheep's Lament)"
2. "Moon Moon"
3. "The Silly Postman"
4. "Cats"
5. "Toffee Apple"
6. "Red Balloon"
7. "Standing on a Bus"
8. "Little Caterpillar"
9. "The Walking Song"
10. "Green Green Green"
11. "Baghdad"
12. "Tadpole Blues"
13. "I Have"
14. "Dr. McKew"
15. "Jeffrey Hill"
16. "Jack and the Beanstalk"
17. "Why Don't We"
18. "Sweet Dreams and Teddy Bears"
19. "Take a Bath"
20. "That's The Way I Like It"
21. "Lullaby (for Tom)"
- All songs composed, arranged and produced by Peter Combe.

== Charts ==
| Chart (1987) | Peak position |
|---|---|
| Australian (Kent Music Report) | 86 |

== Certifications ==
| Region | Certification | Certified units/sales |
|---|---|---|
| Australia (ARIA) | Platinum | 70,000^{^} |
^{^} Shipments figures based on certification alone.

== Release history ==
| Region | Date | Format | Edition(s) | Label | Catalogue |
|---|---|---|---|---|---|
| Australia | June 1987 | LP; CD; cassette | Standard | ABC Records | L27206 / C27206 |
| Australia | 1988 | Gatefold LP | Re-release | ABC Records | 836037-1 |

== Personnel ==
- Peter Combe - lead vocals, guitar

Additional musicians

- Children From Sutherland Christian School, Sydney - backing vocals
- Ross McGregor - piano, synthesizer
- Doug Charleston - bass guitar
- Graham Cox - guitar
- John Grant - guitar
- Michael Fix - guitar
- Merv Dick - drums
- Sean Gilroy - fiddle
- Matt Tone - mandolin
