= LifeEd =

Australian education program

Life Education Australia Logo as of 2021

Life Education Australia (Life Ed) is the largest and most recognised health education provider in Australian schools. Life Ed reaches on average 700,000 children annually where qualified educators present evidence-based preventative health and wellbeing education, along with Healthy Harold, the giraffe puppet and mascot who is the face of the organisation.

Life Education Australia began in 1979, in The Wayside Chapel in Kings Cross by Reverend Ted Noffs, who used his experience with religion to focus on an action-based approach as opposed to preaching. In 2016, the program began to teach topics of illicit drug use like methamphetamine, in response to rising narcotics usage rates in Australia. In 2017, the Australian government announced plans to defund the program, but this was not implemented after public backlash. The in-person program was temporary halted and moved online due to restrictions placed by the Australian government in response to the COVID-19 pandemic, but resumed on 13 October 2020.
