= Gillian Eastoe =

- Born: 5 August 1955 (age 70)
- Genres: Children's
- Labels: ABC for Kids

Gillian Eastoe (born 5 August 1955) is an Australian singer and children's entertainer. Her album Extra Awesome Intergalactical Expedition Into the Far Reaches and Back was nominated for the ARIA Award for Best Children's Album in 1996 but lost to The Wiggles' Wake Up Jeff!.

== Biography ==
In the 1970s, Gillian previously performed with her band King Dog. They performed on Countdown in 1979.

== Discography ==
=== Studio albums ===
- Jellybean Jar (1990) – ABC Music
- Insects and Bugs (1992) – ABC Music
- Extra Awesome Intergalactical Expedition into the Far Reaches and Back (1996) – ABC Music

=== Singles ===
- "Somebody Who Loves You" (1978) – Philips
- "Isn't It Funny" (1981) – Mercury

=== Video albums ===
- "Something About You" (Gillian Eastoe and King Dog) (1979) – Mercury
- Extra Awesome Intergalactical Expedition into the Far Reaches and Back (1996) – ABC Video

== Awards and nominees ==
=== ARIA Music Awards ===
Year	Nominated works	Award	Result
1996	Extra Awesome Intergalactical Expedition	Best Children's Album	Nominated
