= ABC Kids (Australia) =

Australian television channel

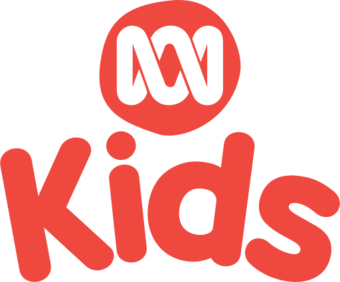
- Logo used since 2020
- Type: Children's programming • Toddler programming
- Country: Australia
- Broadcast area: Nationally
- Network: ABC Television

Programming
- Language: English
- Picture format: 576i SDTV; 720p HDTV (Note: Available on the ABC iview live stream.)

Ownership
- Owner: Australian Broadcasting Corporation
- Sister channels: ABC TV; ABC TV HD; ABC Family; ABC Entertains; ABC News; ABC Australia

History
- Launched: 13 September 1991; 35 years ago (programming block); 1 August 2001; 25 years ago (stand-alone channel); 2 May 2011; 15 years ago (part–time channel)
- Closed: 30 June 2003; 23 years ago (stand-alone channel)
- Former names: ABC For Kids (1991–2001, 2009–2015) abckids (2001–2009); ABC For Kids on 2 (2009–2011); ABC 4 Kids (2011–2015)

Links
- Website: abc.net.au/tv/abckids/

Availability

Terrestrial
- ABN Sydney (DVB-T): 546/674 @ 12 (226.5 MHz)
- ABV Melbourne (DVB-T): 562 @ 12 (226.5 MHz)
- ABQ Brisbane (DVB-T): 578 @ 12 (226.5 MHz)
- ABS Adelaide (DVB-T): 594 @ 12 (226.5 MHz)
- ABW Perth/Mandurah (DVB-T): 738 @ 12 (226.5 MHz)
- ABT Hobart (DVB-T): 626 @ 8 (191.5 MHz)
- ABD Darwin (DVB-T): 642 @ 30 (543.5 MHz)
- Freeview: Channel 22 (shared with ABC Family)

Streaming media
- ABC iview live stream

ABC Kids is the Australian Broadcasting Corporation's free to air part-time channel, broadcasting shows between the hours of 4am and 7:30pm for children 6 years old and younger, including an upper preschool audience. It shares the same bandwidth as ABC Family which broadcasts outside ABC Kids' scheduled hours.

== History ==
=== Origins ===
In 1989, ABC for Kids was formed as a children's music label. Its first project was titled 0–9. In 1991, all children's programming on the ABC was organized into a daily broadcasting block under the name ABC For Kids. This new programming block featured a range of programming ranging from preschoolers to young children and included both old and new content. The logo featured six blocks (3 across, 2 down) with the top row lettered "A", "B" and "C", and the bottom row featuring an apple, a bee and a carrot beneath their respective letter.

=== 2001–2009 ===
In August 2001, the ABC For Kids timeslot was rebranded as abckids and content was expanded to include shows for older children as well as younger children. A new logo was also introduced, featuring a solid green Lissajous curve (taken from the ABC's logo) overlaid with "abckids" in lowercase blue letters.

==== 2001–2003: abckids and Fly TV channels ====
In addition to the daily broadcasting block on the ABC, a new children's channel with the abckids branding commenced transmission nationally on 1 August 2001 on channel 21, becoming ABC Television's first digital multichannel service. The service was officially inaugurated by former ABC Managing Director, Jonathan Shier, at the Australian Parliament House in Canberra on 7 August 2001. The ABC launched the channel without additional funding, hoping that its success would prompt an additional government grant. ABC Kids was broadcast from 6:00am to 6:00pm, with the remaining broadcasting time occupied by its sister service, Fly TV.

Fly TV was launched on 1 November 2001 to feature programming aimed at teenagers and young adults up to early 20s and broadcast a 6-hour block from 6:00pm to 12:00am, which was repeated from 12:00am to 6:00am. In addition to their availability on free-to-air television, the abckids and Fly TV channels were also available on Austar channel 14 and Optus TV channel 21.

The abckids and Fly TV channels were discontinued on 30 June 2003 in the first of a series of cuts to save around A$25 million a year for the ABC. The ABC could not secure government funding to keep the channel on-air, and the sluggish uptake of digital television in Australia at the time made justifying a digital-only channel with a low viewership against the cost of keeping the channel on-air difficult. However, the ABC Kids brand still remained throughout this period on the ABC's daily children's broadcasting block.

After the close of the abckids and Fly TV channels, programming for younger Fly TV viewers was integrated into the ABC Kids broadcasting block.

=== 2009–2011: Split between two channels ===
In February 2009, daily blocks of children's programming were launched on ABC1, running from 6:00am to 11:00am and 3:00pm to 6:00pm weekdays and 6:30am to 9:00am on Sundays. On 4 December 2009, at the same time as the launch of ABC3, a new preschool children's block, ABC For Kids on 2 was launched on ABC2, featuring children's programming each weekday from 9am until 6pm and 6am until 6pm on weekends. Some ABC2 programmes had to be cancelled or relocated to other channels, such as Rage. The classic ABC For Kids logo from 1991 was rendered in 3D when the ABC for Kids name was revived.

=== 2011–present: Part-time channel refocus ===
In May 2011, the weekday morning children's block on ABC1 was removed. ABC for Kids on 2 rebranded as ABC 4 Kids and was refocused as a part-time channel for preschoolers sharing the same bandwidth of ABC2 between 6am and 7pm. A new logo based on the ABC3 logo was also introduced.

In early 2014 all children's programming was removed from the main ABC channel and was divided between ABC 4 Kids and ABC3. Broadcasting of the channel was rescheduled to begin at 5am instead of 6am on 7 July 2014.

On 2 March 2015, the name of the channel was changed to ABC Kids and a new logo inspired by the classic children's logo was unveiled.

Within the rebrand of ABC Comedy on 4 December 2017, broadcasting of the channel was rescheduled to end at 7:30pm instead of 7pm.

The channel again received a new logo and look on 17 March 2020, introducing three animated characters based on the classic logo (an apple, a bee and a crocodile named Croc, instead of a carrot). The rebrand was designed by ABC Made, the ABC's in-house award-winning creative team.

On 1 January 2023, ABC Kids lost an hour of programming, with the closedown and the transition to ABC TV Plus moved to 6:30pm; the ABC cited that ABC TV Plus wanted to take advantage of a "co-viewing" audience of older children and adults in the evenings at that hour, but the decision was criticised by parents who were used to the 7:30pm closedown. On 13 February 2023, the ABC reverted the change and moved ABC Kids' closedown back to 7:30pm.

== See also ==
- Children's programming on ABC Television
- List of digital television channels in Australia
