= Emma Watkins =

Australian musician and actress (born 1989)

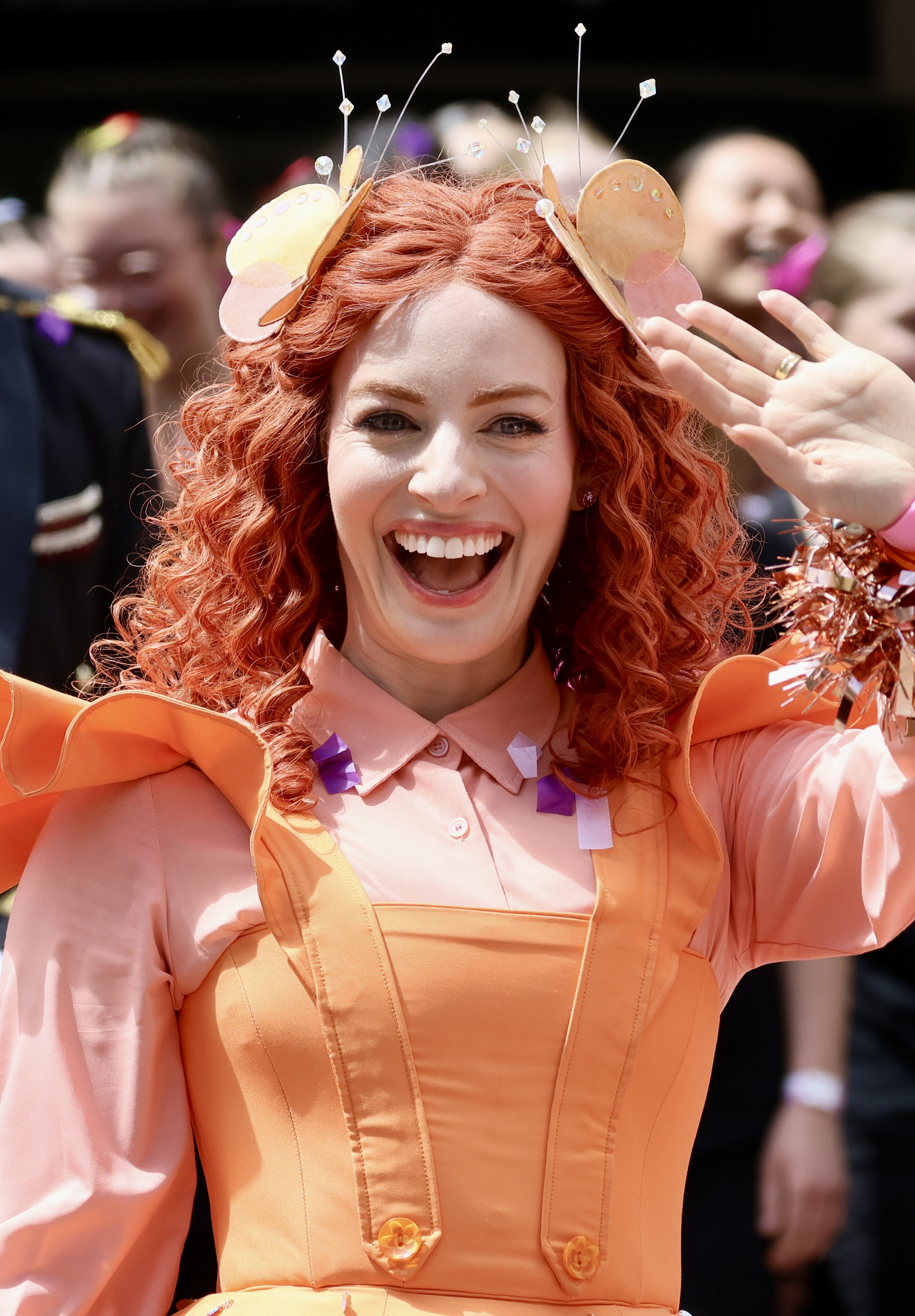
- Watkins in 2025
- Born: Emma Olivia Watkins; 21 September 1989 (age 37); Sydney, New South Wales, Australia
- Other names: Emma Wiggle; Emma Memma
- Occupations: Children's entertainer; dancer; singer; actress
- Years active: 2010–present
- Spouses: Lachlan Gillespie (m. 2016; div. 2018); Oliver Brian (m. 2022)
- Musical career
- Genre: Children's
- Instruments: Vocals; drums; guitar; keyboards
- Formerly of: The Wiggles

YouTube information
- Channel: EmmaMemma-Auslan
- Years active: 2022–present
- Subscribers: 82.2 thousand
- Views: 45 million
- Last updated: 6 August 2026
- Website: emmamemma.com

Emma Olivia Watkins (born 21 September 1989) is an Australian children's entertainer, dancer, singer, and actress. She is best known as the first female member of the children's group the Wiggles, which she was a member of from 2013 to 2021. Due to her popularity in the group, she starred in her own spinoff series as a solo Wiggles performer, titled Emma!. After departing the group, she debuted her own children's entertainment character, Emma Memma, in 2022. She released her first solo children's music album in September 2022, which received an ARIA Award for Best Children's Album in 2023.

Watkins has also appeared in reality television series including The Masked Singer, The Amazing Race Australia and a Christmas special of Lego Masters Australia. She narrated the children's series Reef School, and hosted Teenage Boss: Next Level in 2024.

== Early life ==
Watkins started ballet when she was four. She saw the Wiggles perform Irish dancing and later studied other styles of dance, including jazz, hip hop, tap and contemporary. She attended The McDonald College, a performing arts school, won a full scholarship at the Sydney Film School, and completed a certificate specialising in musical theatre at ED5 International in Sydney. Watkins earned a master's degree in Media Arts and Production at the University of Technology Sydney. She has taught dance to children since she was in high school. She has also performed in Bollywood films, learned drums and other percussion instruments, was crowned Miss Granny Smith Apples in 2009, and was learning Auslan, the Australian sign language, by 2012. As of 2021, she was doing her PhD research on sign language and dance.

== Career ==
=== 2010–2021: The Wiggles ===
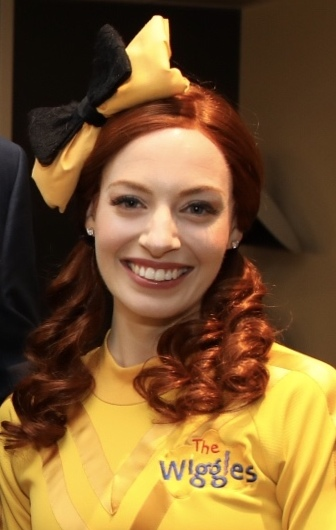
Watkins in 2018 with her signature bow

In 2010, Watkins began performing with the Wiggles, first as Fairy Larissa and then as Wags the Dog, Dorothy the Dinosaur, and as a Wiggly Dancer. She used her film skills during tours with the group, providing them with video and editing services. In May 2012, the Wiggles announced that Watkins would become the first female Wiggle, replacing founding member Greg Page as the Yellow Wiggle. The original members stated that they chose Watkins because she was the most qualified for the job, and commented that it was "a strategy for marketing the Wiggles into the next generation".

Lisa Tolin of the Associated Press called Watkins a strong role model for girls, and reported that her fans came to concerts dressed like her and that they gave her homemade bows, which had become part of her signature look. Because of her popularity, the company produced a new television series titled Emma!, featuring Watkins as a solo performer, which aired in 2015. Up to 80% of the audience at Wiggles concerts would emulate her costuming and wear yellow; by 2021 it was estimated that 50% of the group's merchandising was specific to the "Emma" brand.

In September 2019, it was announced that Watkins would host weekend afternoon programs on Sydney and Melbourne radio station smoothfm. In October 2020, Watkins appeared in the music video for "Back 2 Back" by Samantha Jade. At the 2020 ARIA Music Awards in November, she joined an ensemble of Australian women singers to perform "I Am Woman" as a tribute to its singer and songwriter, Helen Reddy.

It was reported through corporate filings that Watkins had acquired approximately 8% ownership of the Wiggles' brand as well as a company directorship in June 2018. Watkins announced her departure from the Wiggles in October 2021 and was replaced by Tsehay Hawkins.

=== 2022–present: Emma Memma and other television work ===
In early 2022, Watkins hinted at the introduction of a new children's entertainment character, Emma Memma, through her social media. The new character was designed to incorporate elements of song, dance and sign language. Toronto-based company Headspinner Productions announced their partnership with Watkins in July 2022 to debut the character in a new pre-school television series titled Emma Memma: Sing. Dance. Sign. Watkins was appointed as an executive producer for the series, to be produced through her company Apricot Sea. The series is expected to begin filming in early 2023 for release later in the year. The character and its design were officially revealed in July; music videos were subsequently released through YouTube. In February 2023, Watkins released a book to go with her Emma Memma character, music and upcoming children's television series. The book was titled Hello, Emma Memma.

During this period, Watkins competed on the fourth season of the Australian version of The Masked Singer as "Zombie" placing eighth. She also appeared as a celebrity contestant on the 2022 Lego Masters Australia Christmas special. Watkins provided the narration for the ABC children's series Reef School in 2022. In June 2023, Watkins released another children's story book titled Emma Memma: How Are You? as well as her first activity book that was called Emma Memma Sticker Activity Book. Later that year, Watkins competed on the seventh season of The Amazing Race Australia with her sister, Hayley Watkins; tying equal first with Darren McMullen and nephew Tristan, and Alli Simpson and mother Angie. In October 2023, she released her third kids story book, which was titled Emma Memma's Alphabet Day. The book includes a fun little story involving Emma Memma as well as a page full of detailed illustrations presenting each letter of the alphabet in Auslan. She also released her second activity book titled Emma Memma Craft Book. In late 2023, Watkins won an ARIA Award for Best Children's Album for her debut solo album Emma Memma.

In February 2024, Watkins released her first solo EP under Emma Memma, which was called Days of the Week, and it officially dropped on 18 February. In March 2024, she released her third studio album as Emma Memma, titled Twirly Tunes. The album was nominated for best children's album at the 2024 ARIA Awards, making it Watkins's second nomination in the category. Later in the year, Watkins hosted the third season of Teenage Boss. In December 2024, she released a Christmas story book called Emma Memma: Christmas Lights.

== Personal life ==
Watkins and fellow Wiggles performer Lachlan Gillespie were married on 9 April 2016 at Hopewood House in Bowral, New South Wales. On 3 August 2018, Watkins and Gillespie announced their separation.

In April 2018, Watkins was forced to withdraw from several shows, suffering from pain caused by Stage IV endometriosis, undergoing surgery after her diagnosis. Her specialist, Professor Jason Abbott, believes that Watkins's speaking out about her diagnosis helped raise awareness of the condition.

On 5 April 2021, Watkins announced her engagement to Oliver Brian, a musician who worked with the Wiggles. They began dating in December 2019. On 2 May 2022, she and Brian were married.

== Publications ==
- Hello, Emma Memma (February 2023)
- Emma Memma: How Are You? (June 2023)
- Emma Memma Sticker Activity Book (June 2023)
- Emma Memma's Alphabet Day (October 2023)
- Emma Memma Craft Book (October 2023)
- Emma Memma: The Wheels on the Butterfly Bus (February 2024)
- Emma Memma Colouring Book (June 2024)
- Emma Memma: Christmas Lights (December 2024)

== Discography ==
=== Studio albums ===
List of solo studio albums, with selected details and chart positions
Title	Details	Peak chart positions
Title	Details	AUS
Emma Memma	Released: 2 September 2022; Label: Self-released; Format: CD, Digital download, streaming	35
Ballet Time	Released: 17 August 2023; Label: Self-released; Format: Digital download, streaming	—
Twirly Tunes	Released: 15 March 2024; Label: Self-released; Format: Digital download, streaming	—
Dance Island Party	Released: 21 March 2025; Label: Self-released; Format: Digital download, streaming	—
Jungle Picnic	Released: 22 January 2026; Label: Self-released; Format: Digital download, streaming	—
"—" denotes items which failed to chart.

=== Extended plays ===
List of solo extended plays, with selected details
Title	Details
Days of the Week	Released: 18 February 2024; Label: Self-released; Format: digital download, streaming

== Filmography ==
=== The Wiggles ===
Television roles
Year	Title	Role	Notes	Ref.
2022	The Masked Singer	Zombie	Season 4	
2022	Reef School	Narrator		
2022	Lego Masters Australia Christmas special	Herself	Christmas special	
2023	The Amazing Race Australia	Herself	Season 7	
2024	Teenage Boss: Next Level	Host	Series 3	

== Awards and nominations ==
=== AIR Awards ===
The Australian Independent Record Awards (commonly known informally as AIR Awards) is an annual awards night to recognise, promote and celebrate the success of Australia's Independent Music sector.

Year	Nominee / work	Award	Result	Ref.
2023	Emma Memma	Best Independent Children's Album or EP	Nominated	
2024	Ballet Time	Best Independent Children's Album or EP	Nominated	
2025	Twirly Tunes	Best Independent Children's Album or EP	Nominated	
2026	Dance Island Party	Best Independent Children's Album or EP	Nominated	

=== ARIA Music Awards ===
The ARIA Music Awards is an annual awards ceremony that recognises excellence, innovation, and achievement across all genres of Australian music.

Year	Nominee / work	Award	Result	Ref.
2023	Emma Memma	Best Children's Album	Won	
2024	Twirly Tunes	Best Children's Album	Nominated	
2025	Dance Island Party	Best Children's Album	Won	
2026	Jungle Picnic	Best Children's Album	Pending	

=== Australian Women in Music Awards ===
The Australian Women in Music Awards is an annual event that celebrates outstanding women in the Australian Music Industry who have made significant and lasting contributions in their chosen field. They commenced in 2018.

Year	Nominee / work	Award	Result	Ref.
2024	Emma Watkins	Special Impact Award	Won	
2026	Emma Watkins	Diversity in Music Award	Nominated	
