= Kate Duncan =

Kate Duncan may refer to:

- Kate Duncan (music executive)
- Kate Duncan (furniture maker)
