= Jennifer Nelson (filmmaker) =

American director and filmmaker

Jennifer Nelson is an American documentary filmmaker, based in New York, known for successfully suing the company Warner/Chappell Music for false claims of copyright to the song "Happy Birthday to You", thereby clarifying its public domain status in the US.

== 2013 lawsuit over Happy Birthday To You ==
On June 13, 2013, Nelson filed a class action suit in federal court for the Southern District of New York against Warner/Chappell in the name of her production company, Good Morning to You Productions. As part of a documentary she was making about the song and its history, she had paid US$1,500 to secure the rights. She had become interested in the culture of birthday celebrations while working on the MTV reality show My Super Sweet 16, and in 2016 described having launched her four-year "campaign to liberate the people's song" as "a matter of conscience".

Her complaint relied heavily on research by US law professor Robert Brauneis, and sought not only the return of her money but all royalties collected by the company from other filmmakers since 2009. A week later a similar case was filed in the Central District of California, Rupa Marya v. Warner Chappell Music Inc, Case No. 2:13-cv-04460. Five weeks later, Nelson refiled the case there, and the cases were combined. As of April 2014, Warner's motion to dismiss had been denied without prejudice, and discovery began under an agreed plan with respect to Claim One, declaratory judgment as to whether "Happy Birthday to You" is in the public domain. The Motion Cut-Off as to Merits Issues on the Claim One deadline was November 7, 2014. After that, the court was expected to rule on the motion for summary judgment as to the merits issues on Claim One. A jury trial was requested.

On July 28, 2015, one day prior to a scheduled ruling, Nelson's attorneys Betsy Manifold and Mark Rifkin presented new evidence which they argued was conclusive proof that the song was in the public domain, "thus making it unnecessary for the Court to decide the scope or validity of the disputed copyrights, much less whether Patty Hill abandoned any copyright she may have had to the lyrics." Several weeks prior, they had been given access to documents held back from them by Warner/Chappell, which included a copy of the 15th edition of The Everyday Song Book, published in 1927. The book contained "Good Morning and Happy Birthday", but the copy was blurry, obscuring a line of text below the title. Manifold and Rifkin located a clearer copy of an older edition, published in 1922, that also contained the "Happy Birthday" lyrics. The previously obscured line was revealed to be the credit "Special permission through courtesy of The Clayton F Summy Co.". Manifold and Rifkin argued that because the music and lyrics were published without a valid copyright notice as was required at the time, "Happy Birthday" was in the public domain.

Warner/Chappell disputed the evidence, arguing that unless there was "necessary authorization from the copyright owner", the "Happy Birthday" lyrics and sheet music would still be subject to common law copyright as an unpublished work, and that it was unknown whether the "special permission" from the Summy Company covered "Good Morning to All", "Happy Birthday", or both, thus alleging that the publication in The Everyday Song Book was unauthorized. The company also argued that it was not acting in bad faith in withholding the evidence of the 1927 publication.

On September 22, 2015, federal judge George H. King ruled that the Warner/Chappell copyright claim over the lyrics was invalid. The 1935 copyright held by Warner/Chappell applied only to a specific piano arrangement of the song, not the lyrics or melody. The court held that the question of whether the 1922 and 1927 publications were authorized, thus placing the song in the public domain, presented questions of fact that would need to be resolved at trial. However, Warner/Chappell had failed to prove that it actually had ever held a copyright to the lyrics, so the court was able to grant summary judgment to the plaintiffs, thus resolving the case.

Some initial news sources characterized the decision as ruling that the song was in the public domain, but the decision did not go so far, holding only that Warner/Chappell did not prove they owned the copyright. However, because there are no other claimants to the copyright, and the copyright to the melody long ago expired, the plaintiffs suggested that the song is effectively in the public domain.

Prior to the lawsuit, Warner/Chappell had been earning $2 million a year licensing the song for commercial use. In February 2016 Warner/Chappell settled for US$14 million, paving the way for the song to become public domain.
