= Extraordinary rendition (disambiguation) =

Extraordinary rendition is a type of state-sponsored extraterritorial abduction.

Extraordinary Rendition may also refer to:

- Extraordinary Rendition (film), a 2007 drama film
- Extraordinary Rendition (album), a 2008 album recorded by Rupa & the April Fishes

== See also ==
- Extraordinary Rendition Band, a protest band in Rhode Island, United States
