= Toni Janke =

Australian contemporary singer/songwriter/musician

- Genres: Contemporary Indie artist
- Occupation(s): Singer, consultant, coach and mentor
- Instrument(s): Vocals, Acoustic guitar
- Years active: 1993–present
- Labels: Toni Janke Productions

Toni Janke (/ˈdʒæŋki/ JANG-kee) is an Australian Indigenous singer/songwriter/musician.

== Early life and career ==
She was one of youngest Indigenous students to graduate from university. Toni holds qualifications in arts, law, ministry and theology. She set up her own independent music label, Toni Janke Productions in the 1990s. Toni is a coach, mentor and consultant who runs her own business, Toni Janke Productions.

== Personal life ==
She lives in Meanjin (Brisbane QLD) and has two adult daughters. She has written and recorded several original songs and regularly performs as a solo artist or with her own band.

== Discography ==
=== Albums ===
List of albums, with selected details
Title	Details
The Brink	Released: November 1999; Label: Toni Janke
Eternal	Released: July 2001; Label: Toni Janke
Jewel of the North	Released: 2004; Label: Toni Janke

=== Extended plays ===
List of EPs, with selected details
Title	Details
Heart Speak Out	Released: 1993; Label: Toni Janke Productions (CD TJ001)

== Awards ==
=== Australian Women in Music Awards ===
The Australian Women in Music Awards is an annual event that celebrates outstanding women in the Australian Music Industry who have made significant and lasting contributions in their chosen field. They commenced in 2018.

Year	Nominee / work	Award	Result	Ref.
2024	Toni Janke	Diversity in Music Award	Won	
