= Anita Wardell =

British jazz musician and music educator

Anita Wardell (born 23 August 1961) is an English jazz singer, known for her scat singing.

Wardell was born in Guildford, Surrey, in England and raised in Australia. She studied jazz at Adelaide University before singing at festivals with James Morrison, Don Burrows, and Richie Cole. She then returned to her studies, this time in the UK at Guildhall School of Music and Drama. In 1994 she recorded as a duo with drummer John Stevens. During the following year, she released an album in a duo with Liam Noble.

She has taught a jazz course in the Loire department of France. Wardell is noted for her vocalised version of Lee Morgan's solo from "Moanin'".

== Discography ==
- Straight Ahead (33 Jazz, 1998)
- Why Do You Cry? (FMR, 1999)
- Until the Stars Fade (Symbol, 2002)
- Noted (Proper/Specific Jazz, 2006)
- Kinda Blue (Specific Jazz, 2008)
- The Road (E1/Specific Jazz, 2013)
- Stars (2022)

== Awards and nominations ==
She won the BBC Best of Jazz Award in 2006.

=== Australian Women in Music Awards ===
The Australian Women in Music Awards is an annual event that celebrates outstanding women in the Australian Music Industry who have made significant and lasting contributions in their chosen field. They commenced in 2018.

Year	Nominee / work	Award	Result
2026	Anita Wardell	Lifetime Achievement Award	Nominated
