= Grace Woodroofe =

Australian blues singer and guitarist

Grace Rachel Woodroofe is a blues singer and guitarist from Perth, Australia. From 2015 to 2021, she performed under the name R.W. Grace. In 2023 she announced her return to music with a new single "Beginning", again using her original artist name of "Grace Woodroofe".

== Career ==
When she was 17 and still in high school, Woodroofe recorded two demos of songs she wrote and uploaded them to the Triple J website Unearthed. One of her friends was also Heath Ledger's sister, and the friend sent Ledger a link to Woodroofe's music. Ledger liked Woodroofe's music, so he invited her to Los Angeles, where she met Ben Harper. Woodroofe was Ledger's first music act signed to his label The Masses. Harper later produced her debut album, Always Want, and his band, Relentless7, played on the album. Ledger also produced a video for her cover of the David Bowie song "Quicksand". In 2010, she said of this video that "It was completely his vision. He directed it, edited it, styled it and shot it. He did everything," adding that "When people will see it they will realise how amazingly gifted he was." Always Want was originally released only in Australia on 27 September 2011, and was released in the United States the following January, both times on Modular Recordings. She also collaborated with Mark Eitzel on the album; for example, they co-wrote its title track. In May 2013, she released the song "Dead Weight", reportedly as a single from her upcoming second album.

In 2014, she rebranded herself simply as "Grace" and released the single "Pluto" on Liberation Music. She had recorded the song in Los Angeles with Dave Sitek. She moved to Sydney, Australia in March 2015. After fellow Australian singer Grace Sewell, also performing under the name "Grace", released a successful single in May 2015, Woodroofe decided to rebrand herself as "R.W. Grace". The R. refers to her middle name, "Rachel", while the W. stands for her last name. Her music released under the "R.W. Grace" moniker is considered to contain elements of electronica and folk. In 2015, she released the EP Love It Need It Miss It Want It, also on Liberation Music.

== Critical reception ==
According to review aggregator Metacritic, Always Want has a score of 72 out of 100 based on 5 reviews. AllMusic's Jon O'Brien gave the album 3.5 out of 5 stars, and described it as "an always intriguing listen which appears to have fulfilled the potential of [Woodroofe's] fairy tale beginnings." Some critics compared Woodroofe's style on the album to that of Fiona Apple and Amy Winehouse. Consequence of Sound's Alex Young gave the album a C+, describing it as "an album of powerfully raw emotions."

Journalist Kim Taylor Bennett described Woodroofe's song "Pluto" as "PJ Harvey if she was raised on synths rather than distorted guitars". In describing the same song, Bennett also wrote, "Sensuously spare verses creep towards a chorus that's full blown pop without losing any of its edge."

== Discography ==
=== Albums ===
List of albums, with selected details
Title	Details
Always Want	Released: 2010; Format: CD; Label: Black Swan Records (BSMCD001)

== Awards and nominations ==
=== Australian Women in Music Awards ===
The Australian Women in Music Awards is an annual event that celebrates outstanding women in the Australian Music Industry who have made significant and lasting contributions in their chosen field. They commenced in 2018.

Year	Nominee / work	Award	Result
2026	Grace Woodroofe	Songwriter Award	Nominated
