= 2026 Australian Women in Music Awards =

Edition of annual Australian Women in Music Awards

- Date: 27 May 2027
- Venue: Brisbane
- Website: womeninmusicawards.com.au

The 2026 AWMA is the seventh Australian Women in Music Awards. The finalists in 22 categories (two more than 2025) were announced in August 2026 with the winners to be announced in May 2027. The 2026 finalists were assessed by a 63-member Juror Council, led by Dr Diana Tolmie.

== AWMA Honour Roll ==
- TBA

== AWMA Aboriginal & Torres Strait Islander Cultural Legacy Award ==
- TBA

== AWMA Inspiration Award ==
- Kim Bowers (to be presented 20 March 2026)

== Nominees and winners ==
=== AWMA Awards ===
Winners indicated in boldface, with other nominees in plain.

Full list of nominees
Lifetime Achievement Award	Humanitarian Award
Margaret Brandman; Judy Small (AM); Anita Wardell	Dr Yantra de Vilder; Louise Sawilejskij; Zoe Scrogings
Diversity in Music Award	Studio Production Award
Karen Kyriakou; Emma Memma; Mindy Meng Wang	Sarah Belkner; Sophie Edwards; Monique Sesto
Live Creative Production Award	Live Production Touring Award
Carly Griffen; Sarah Ponturo; Kearna Sweeney	Robyn Jelleff; Katy Richards; Mahalia Swinfield
Music Leadership Award	Songwriter Award
Vivienne Mellish; Katy Richards; Kristy Rosser	Babyshakes Dillon; Ruby Gill; Grace Woodroofe
Music Photographer Award	Film-maker Award
Giulia McGauran; Simone Gorman-Clark; Jordy	Phoebe Faye; Emma Franz
Artistic Excellence Award	Creative Leadership Award
Aviva Endean; Mindy Meng Wang; Jessica Wells	Sonja Horbelt; Stephanie Nicholls; Chelsea Wilson
Excellence in Classical Music Award	Music Journalist Award
Jessica Gethin; Sophie Rowell; Jessica Wells	Heather Anderson; Megan Burslem; Clare Neal
Heavy Music Award	Emerging Artist Award
Robyn Doreian; Candace Krieger; Rachel Whitford	Lottie McLeod; Paulina; Steph Strings
Music Advocacy Award	Opera Impact Award
Kate Duncan; Alexandra Morse; Chrissie Vincent	Laura Hansford; Jessica O'Donoghue; Katrina Waters
Special Impact Award	
Tania de Jong (AM); Tracee Hutchison; Deb Suckling	
