= Eddie Woo =

Australian online maths teacher

Eddie Woo FRSN
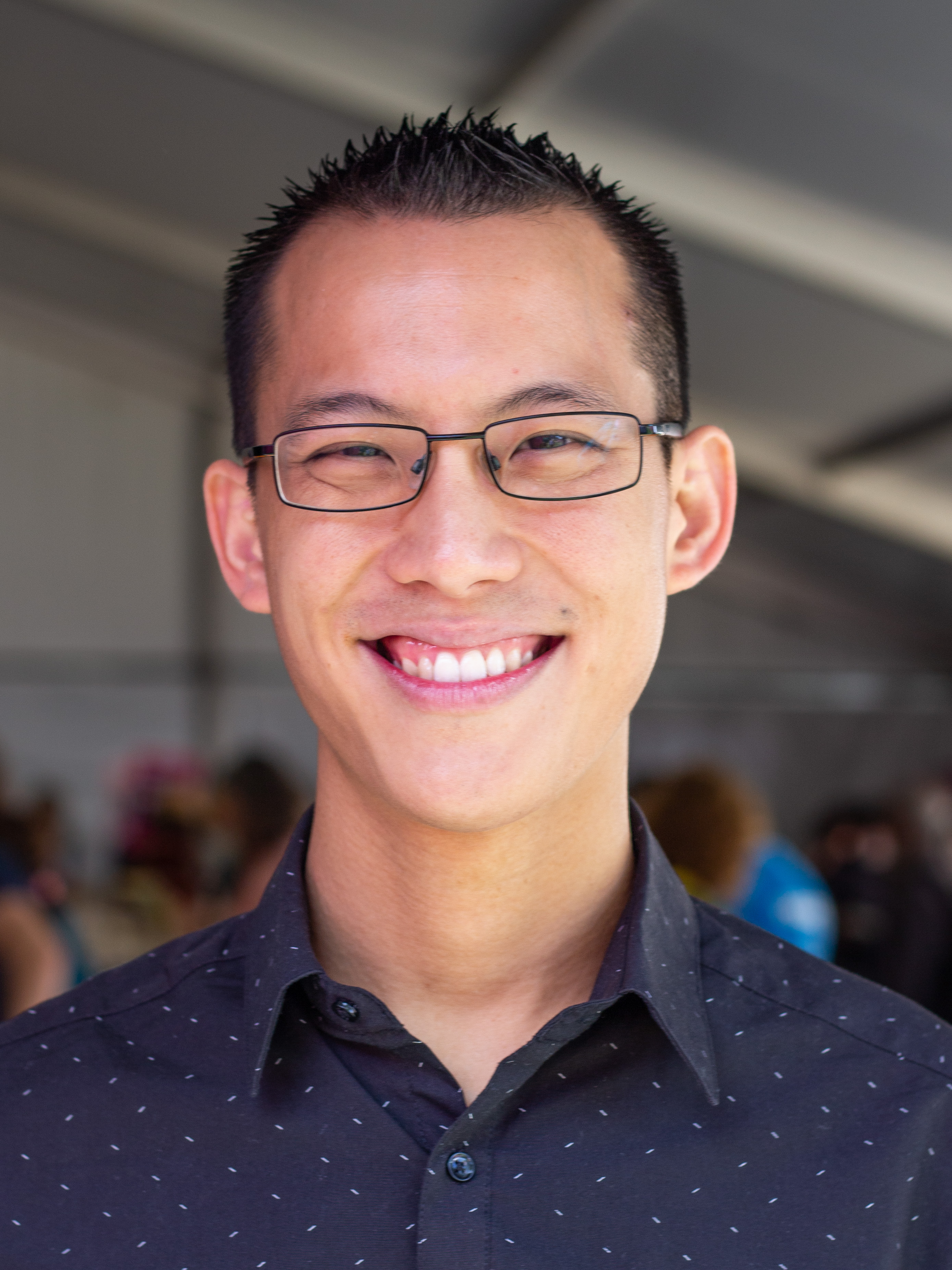
- Woo in 2019
- Born: Edward Kent Woo; 19 September 1985 (age 41); Camperdown, New South Wales, Australia
- Education: James Ruse Agricultural High School; University of Sydney
- Occupations: High school teacher; Writer; YouTuber
- Years active: 2007–present
- Employer: NSW Department of Education
- Known for: Online mathematics lessons
- Television: Teenage Boss
- Spouse: Michelle Woo
- Children: 3

YouTube information
- Channel: Eddie Woo
- Years active: 2011-present
- Subscribers: 2 million
- Views: 187 million
- Last updated: 17 August 2026
- Website: misterwootube.com

Edward Kent Woo is an Australian secondary school teacher and writer best known for his online mathematics lessons published on YouTube. In 2018, Woo was awarded the Australia's Local Hero Award.

== Early life ==
Woo was born in Camperdown, New South Wales and grew up in North Rocks. His ethnic Chinese parents migrated to Australia from Malaysia around 1970 for better education opportunities for their children. He has an older brother, who works in IT, and an older sister, who is a dentist. Woo studied at the James Ruse Agricultural High School in Sydney and completed his Higher School Certificate in 2003, placing in the top band for mathematics extension 1 and English extension 2. He earned his Bachelor of Education (Honours) in secondary mathematics and information technology from the University of Sydney in 2008.

== Career ==
Woo started his career with a brief stint as a technology teacher at the Fort Street High School in 2007, before moving to the James Ruse Agricultural High School, where in 2008 he held the position of teacher of mathematics and technology. He stayed until 2013 before becoming head teacher of mathematics at the Cherrybrook Technology High School. Woo remains there as a classroom teacher, but also serves as leader of mathematics growth for the NSW Department of Education. As of 2024, he has taught mathematics for over 16 years. He began filming his classroom lessons in 2012 for a sick student who was absent from school. His YouTube channel has over 1.92 million subscribers and more than 178.67 million views worldwide as of August 2025. In 2018, Woo hosted a show called Teenage Boss on ABC ME, which gave teens control of their family's financial decisions for a month. In June 2018, Woo delivered a TEDx Talk titled "Mathematics is the sense you never knew you had", which garnered a lot of positive attention online.

Woo has so far published two books. The first, titled Woo's Wonderful World of Maths, was published on 25 September 2018. It addresses questions like "Why are rainbows curved?" and "Why aren't left-handers extinct?", with the answer being: maths, and that maths is all about patterns with the universe is extraordinarily patterned. The second, Eddie Woo's Magical Maths, is a children's activity book.

In September 2022, Woo co-hosted high-school television series Ultimate Classroom, an educational STEM competition sponsored by the Australian Defence Force, alongside presenter Stephanie Bendixsen. A second season of Ultimate Classroom began, hosted by Woo, in February 2026.

On 17 August 2026, a selection of Woo's videos was added to the National Film & Sound Archive alongside nine other creators in a collaborative partnership with YouTube.

== Awards ==
In October 2015, Woo was a joint recipient of the NSW Premier's Prize for Innovation in Science and Mathematics Education.

He was one of ten teachers to win the inaugural Choose Maths Awards on 26 August 2016.

In April 2017, Woo won the 2017 University of Sydney Young Alumni Award for Outstanding Achievement.

In March 2017, he was one of 12 Australian teachers to win a Commonwealth Bank Teaching Award, a prestigious national awards event co-presented each year by the Commonwealth Bank and education charity Schools Plus.

In November 2017, he was named 2018 NSW Local Hero.

Woo gave the Australia Day Address in NSW in 2018, the first time a teacher has done so.

On 25 January 2018, Woo won the Australia's Local Hero Award at the Australian of the Year Awards.

In March 2018, Woo was named a Top 10 Finalist in the Global Teacher Prize.

In May 2019, Woo received an Honorary Fellowship from Western Sydney University.

In September 2019, Woo became a Fellow of the Royal Society of New South Wales.

In February 2021, Woo received the Mathical Honors for It's a Numberful World: How Math Is Hiding Everywhere.

== Personal life ==
Woo is a committed Christian, stating, "We talk about the fact that the universe is designed in this way and you can find all of these patterns; do you think that that's a coincidence? One of the things I love to point out is we call the universe the cosmos which means ordered and structured and designed, as opposed to chaos, and the reason why we can find these mathematical principles is because there was a Designer. We didn't just spring into being. It has immense beauty."

Woo is married and has three children. His middle child, Nathan, is adopted.
