= Steph Strings =

Australian musician

- Born
- Origin: Melbourne, Australia
- Genres: Folk music, indie folk, indie pop
- Occupations: Singer; songwriter
- Instruments: acoustic guitar (preferable), piano, electric guitar (occasionally)
- Years active: 2017–present

Steph Strings, is an Australian fingerstyle guitarist, singer and songwriter.

== Early life and education ==
String commenced piano lessons at age seven and guitar lessons at age nine.. As a teenager, she learned to play the guitar by searching YouTube after school. She came upon a clip of OneRepublic’s Zach Filkins playing intricate flamenco guitar at one of the band’s stadium shows. "I just remember my heart racing and my world opened up because I knew I could do that — even though I obviously wasn’t at that stage skill-wise or even performance-wise or confidence-wise. He’s ripping in and it’s cool just to be up there by yourself — with no vocals."

== Career ==
=== 2017–2024: EPs ===
In January 2018, Strings released her debut EP Allegoric Oceans, which was followed by Wildfire in 2022.

In April 2023, Strings released her third EP Lion.

=== 2025–present: Feel Alive ===
In November 2025, Strings announced the release of her debut album Feel Alive, saying "This album is everything I've dreamed of. I want people to dance, cry, dream and feel. I pinch myself every day that I get to make music and travel the world.". The album was released on 9 January 2026. The album debuted at number 17 on the ARIA Charts.

== Discography ==
=== Albums ===
List of albums, with selected details
| Title | Album details | Peak chart positions |
| Title | Album details | AUS |
|---|---|---|
| Feel Alive | Released: 9 January 2026; Label: Steph Strings (STRINGS01CD); Formats: CD, digital download, streaming | 17 |

=== Extended plays ===
List of extended plays, with selected details
| Title | Details |
|---|---|
| Allegoric Oceans | Released: January 2018; Format: Digital; Label: Synesthesia |
| Wildfire | Released: April 2022; Format: Digital; Label: Steph Strings |
| Lion | Released: 21 April 2023; Format: CD, digital; Label: Steph Strings |
| Cradle Mountain | Released: 28 June 2024; Format: CD, digital; Label: Steph Strings |

== Awards and nominations ==
=== AIR Awards ===
The Australian Independent Record Awards (commonly known informally as AIR Awards) is an annual awards night to recognise, promote and celebrate the success of Australia's Independent Music sector.

| Year | Nominee / work | Award | Result | Ref. |
|---|---|---|---|---|
| 2025 | Cradle Mountain | Best Independent Blues and Roots Album or EP | Nominated | |

=== Australian Women in Music Awards ===
The Australian Women in Music Awards is an annual event that celebrates outstanding women in the Australian Music Industry who have made significant and lasting contributions in their chosen field. They commenced in 2018.

| Year | Nominee / work | Award | Result |
|---|---|---|---|
| 2026 | Steph Strings | Emerging Artist Award | Nominated |

=== Environmental Music Prize ===
The Environmental Music Prize is a quest to find a theme song to inspire action on climate and conservation. It commenced in 2022.

| Year | Nominee / work | Award | Result | Ref. |
|---|---|---|---|---|
| 2025 | "Lion" | Environmental Music Prize | Nominated | |
