= 2024 Australian Women in Music Awards =

Edition of annual Australian Women in Music Awards

- Date: 2 October 2024
- Venue: Fortitude Music Hall
- Website: womeninmusicawards.com.au

The 2024 AWMA was the fifth Australian Women in Music Awards. The finalists were announced on 24 July 2024 and feature 57 finalists across 19 categories with the winners announced on 2 October 2024.

== AWMA Honour Roll ==
- Dame Joan Sutherland (OM, AC, DBE)
- Patricia Amphlett (OAM)

== Nominees and winners ==
=== AWMA Awards ===
Winners indicated in boldface, with other nominees in plain.

Full list of nominees
Lifetime Achievement Award	Humanitarian Award
**Kasey Chambers**; Deborah Conway; Tana Douglas	**Gemma Farrell**; Liz Archer; Jodie Kell
Diversity in Music Award	Studio Production Award
**Toni Janke**; Morwenna Collett; Sandra Morales	**Charlotte Adelle**; Rebecca Price; Becki Whitton
Live Creative Production Award	Live Production Touring Award
**Anusha Matthews**; Janelle Colquhoun; Sharni Honor	**Tana Douglas**; Jenny Hong; Katy Richards
Music Leadership Award	Songwriter Award
**Kerry Kennell**; Susan Cotchin; Kat McGuffie	**Alice Ivy**; WILSN; Mo'Ju
Music Photographer Award	Film-maker Award
**Lucinda Goodwin**; Izzie Austin; Brittany Long	**Tori Styles**; Izzie Austin; Jess Milne
Artistic Excellence Award	Creative Leadership Award
**Mo'Ju**; Kasey Chambers; Katie Noonan	**Kat McGuffie**; Phoebe Bennett; Chelsea Wilson
Excellence in Classical Music Award	Music Journalist Award
**Sonya Lifschitz**; Miriam Gordon-Stewart; Karin Schaupp	**Ellie Robinson**; Mawunyo Gbogbo; Tait McGregor
Women in Heavy Music Award	Emerging Artist Award
**Tiana Speter**; Mikaila Delgado; Moni Lashes	**Ruby Archer**; Mathilde Anne; Cassidy Paris
Executive Leader Game Changer Award	Opera Australia Impact Award
**Chris Erskine**; Paula Girvan; Sean Warner	**Linda Thompson**; Andrée Greenwell; Jessica O'Donoghue
Special Impact Award	Inspiration Award
**Emma Watkins**; Xylo Aria; Rebecca Price	
