= Rupa & the April Fishes =

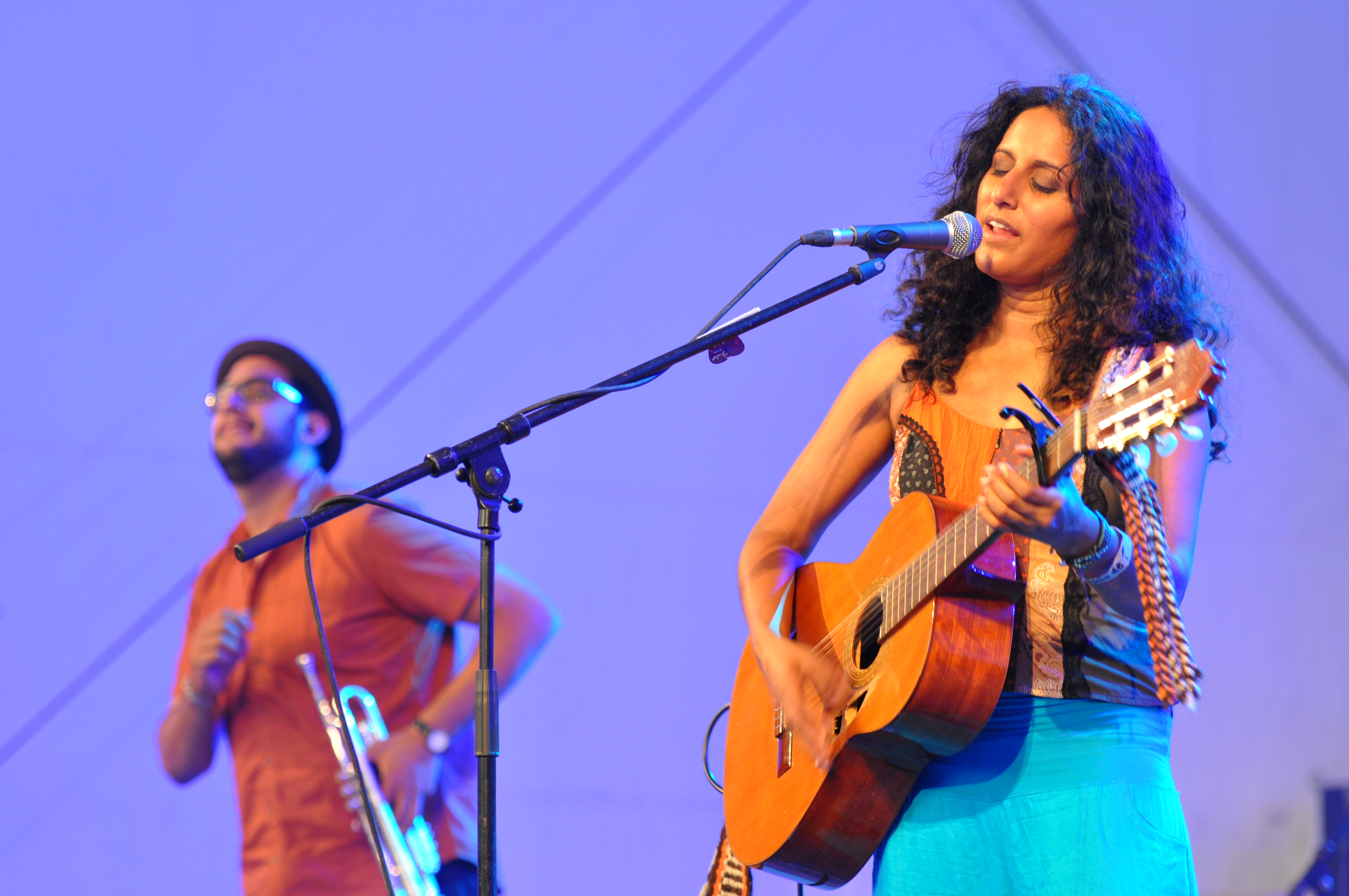
- Rupa & the April Fishes at Horizonte Festival 2014

Background information
- Origin: San Francisco, California, United States
- Genres: Global Alternative music
- Instruments: Upright Bass, cello, keyboard, trumpet, drums, vocals, guitar
- Label: Electric Gumbo Radio Music
- Members: Rupa; Aaron Kierbel, JHNO, Misha Khalikulov, Mario Alberto Silva
- Website: www.theaprilfishes.com

Rupa and the April Fishes is a global alternative music group based in San Francisco, California, fronted by composer, singer and guitarist Rupa Marya. Marya is also an author and physician, who teaches internal medicine at the UCSF School of Medicine. The group's songs are a mixture of musical styles ranging from jazz to punk to reggae to nouvelle chanson, with lyrics in multiple languages (primarily French, Spanish and English).

The group began as a duet between Rupa Marya and cellist Ed Baskerville, and then grew to a band in San Francisco.

The name “April Fishes” is a literal translation of the French term "poissons d'avril [fr]", for tricks played on April Fools' Day.

The group was featured on BBC World Service's and Public Radio Internationals The World.

The group has toured around the world and played at WOMAD, the Sziget Festival, Montreal Jazz Festival, Central Park Summerstage, Chicago Millennium Park, Sierra Nevada World Music Festival, Rajasthan International Folk Festival, and the Mosaic Music Festival.

== Discography ==
- La Pêcheuse EP (2006)
- eXtraOrdinary rendition (Cumbancha, 2008). The title refers to the US policy of Extraordinary Rendition.
- Este mundo (Cumbancha, 2009): The Spanish title means 'this world'. Guests include Boots Riley and Djordje Stijepovic.
- Build (Electric Gumbo Radio Music, 2012)
- LIVE at the Independent (Electric Gumbo Radio Music, 2014)
- OVAL (Electric Gumbo Radio Music), 2015)

== Gallery ==
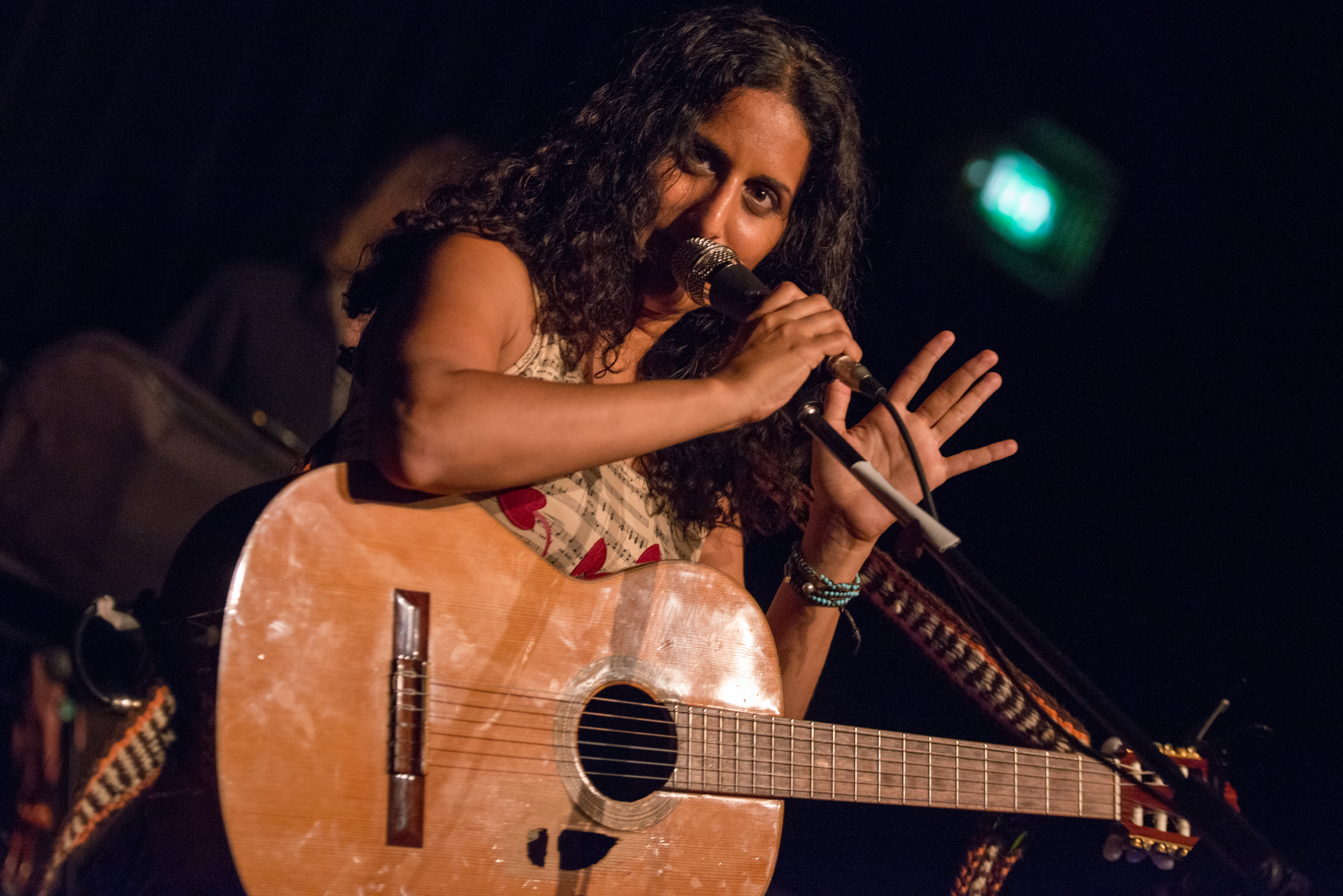
Rupa Marya

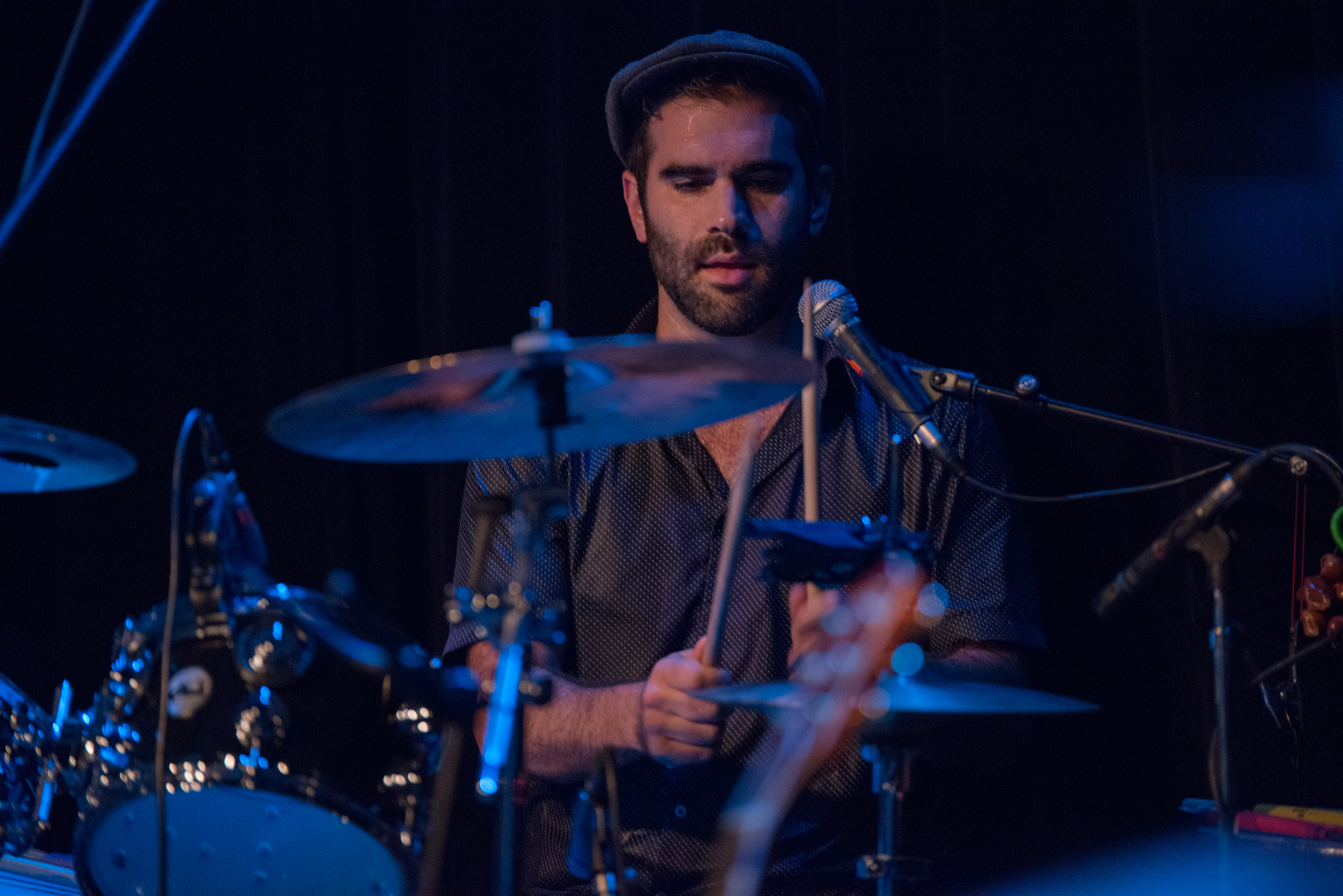
Aaron Kierbel

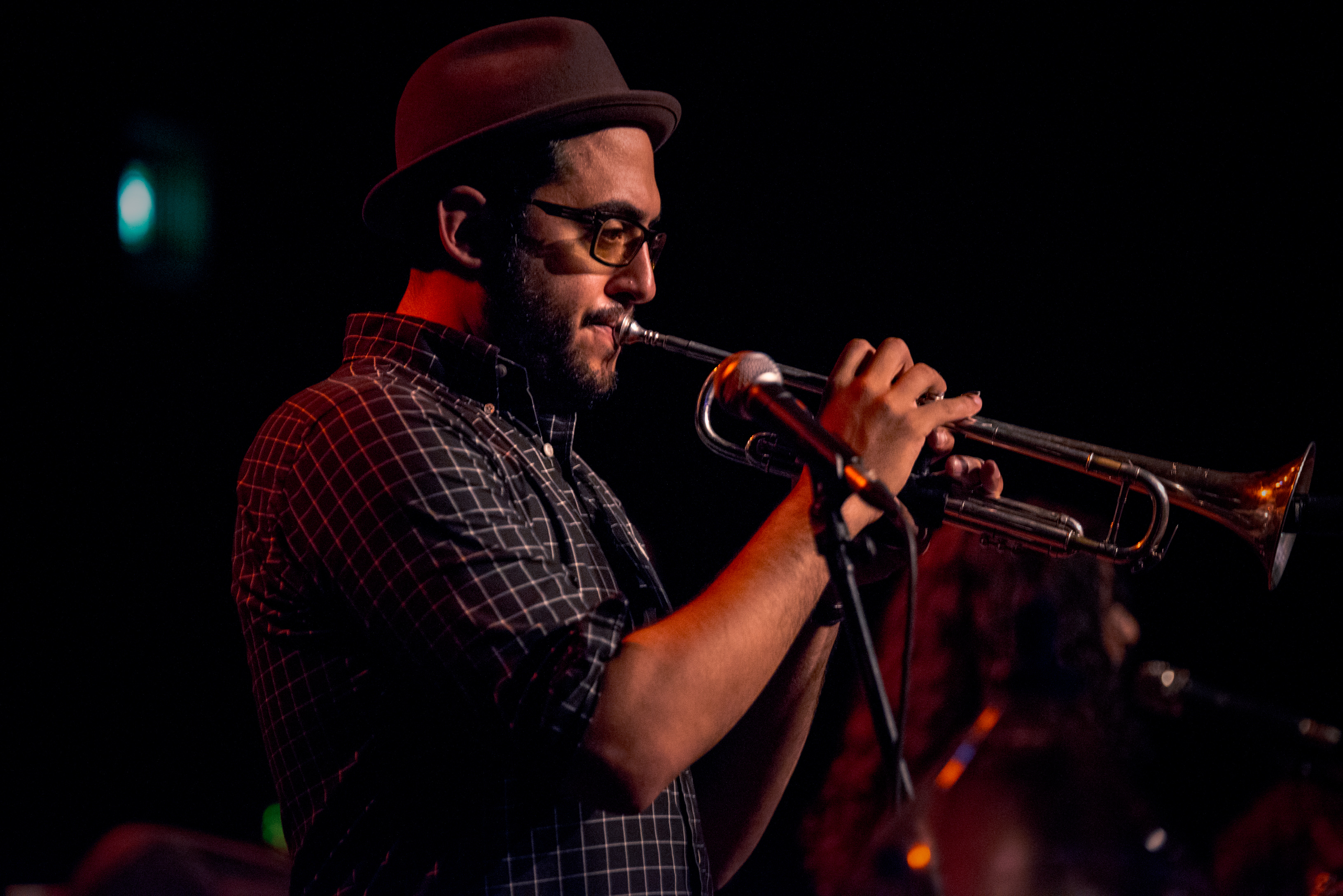
Mario Alberto Silva

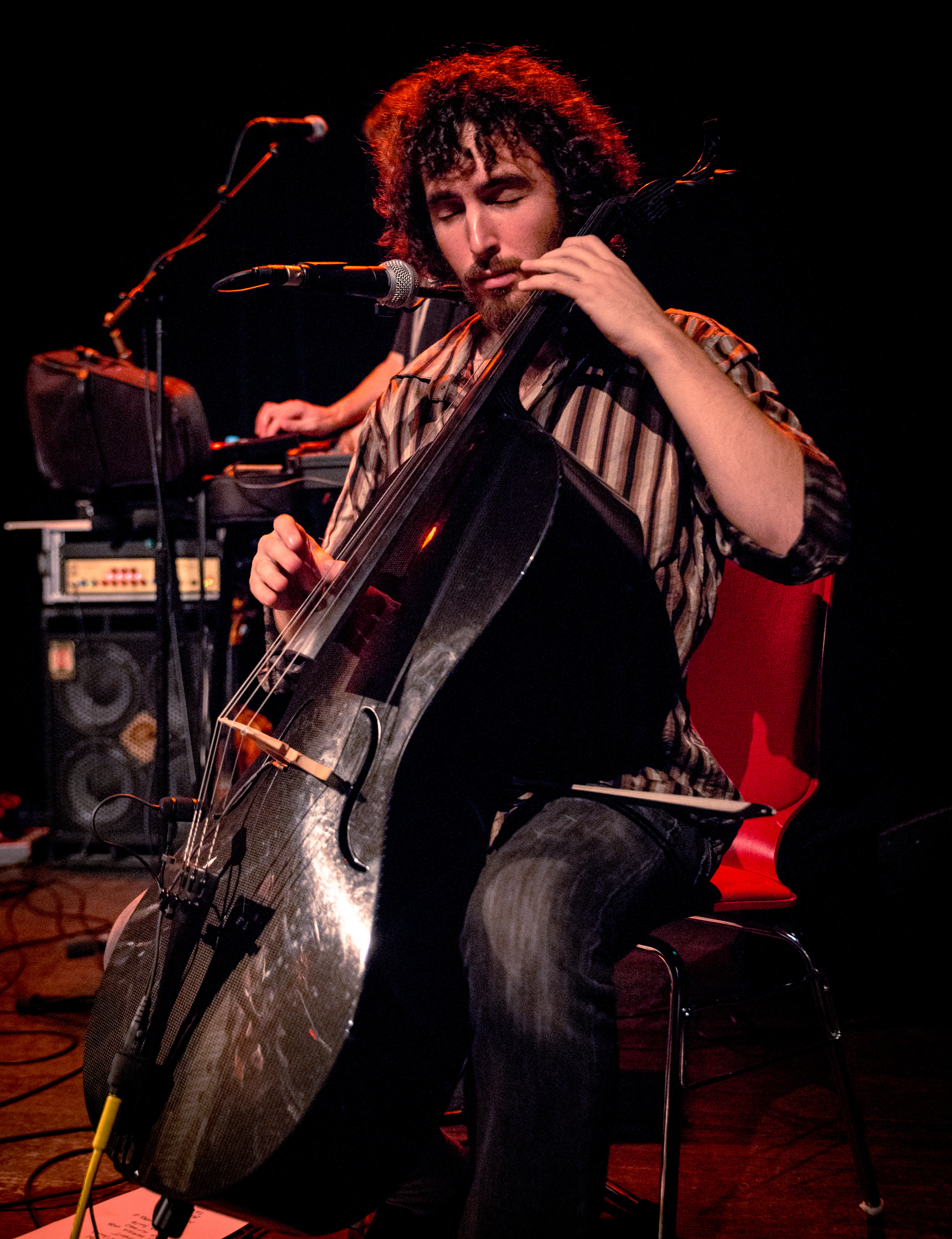
Misha Khalikulov
