= Dance Island Party =

2025 album by Emma Memma

Studio album by Emma Memma
- Released: 21 March 2025
- Genre: Children's
- Length: 20:05
- Label: Emma Memma

Emma Memma chronology
Twirly Tunes (2024)	Dance Island Party (2025)

Dance Island Party is the fourth studio album by Australian children's entertainer Emma Watkins, under the character alias, Emma Memma. The album was released on 21 March 2025. The album was supported with a 45-minute live tour featuring Auslan interpretation throughout.

At the 2025 ARIA Music Awards, the album won Best Children's Album. At the AIR Awards of 2026, it was nominated for Best Independent Children's Album or EP.

== Track listing ==
1. "Dance Island Party" - 2:15
2. "Jellyfish Blob" - 1:50
3. "Beach Trolley" - 1:49
4. "Five Starfish" - 1:47
5. "Crocodile Snap" - 1:46
6. "Turtle Hide and Seek" - 1:54
7. "Ballet Crab" - 1:30
8. "Row Row Row Your Boat" - 1:29
9. "Coconut Tree" - 1:34
10. "Beach Waves" - 1:47
11. "Beach Nap" - 2:21
