= Tana Douglas =

Australian roadie

Tana Douglas (born c.1958) is an Australian-born music industry professional, generally recognized as the world's first female roadie. In a career spanning more than three decades, she worked for many influential rock-and-roll acts, including AC/DC, Status Quo, The Who, Elton John, The Runaways, and Iggy Pop. In 2021, Douglas' memoir LOUD: A Life in Rock 'n' Roll by the World's First Female Roadie was published by HarperCollins.

Stuart Coupe, journalist and historian of the Australian rock scene, described Douglas as "a game changer" and "a pioneering woman...in the ultra-male world of road crew.”

== Early life ==
Douglas' early life was turbulent: her parents split when she was four; her violent, alcoholic mother moved her from town to town; her elder sister ran away. Douglas has described feeling out of place in school and being drawn to music, as a comfort and escape. She also acknowledged her own rebellious nature: “The nuns didn’t like me much,” she recalled in an interview with NPR. “I didn’t quite fit the mold of what they were trying to bring up.” Douglas ran away from boarding school at age 15, and gravitated toward the Sydney music scene of the early 1970s: “I just wanted to be where the noise was,” she told The Guardian.

== Career ==
Douglas' first experience as a "roadie" was unplanned and unpaid: in 1973, she helped Melbourne band Fox load their truck after a gig in Sydney, hoping to secure a free ride home to Melbourne for her roommate. When the band next returned to Sydney, they hired her to join their two-person crew.

In the summer of 1974, Douglas was introduced to the band AC/DC, which was recording its first album and preparing to tour. At age 16, Douglas was hired as the band's first backline roadie, and was paid $60 a week for food and incidentals. During this period, she lived in a shared house with bandmates and brothers Malcolm Young and Angus Young, forming a bond she described as sibling-like; she later recalled this as one of the happiest periods of her life. She further observed that the band and crew was a surrogate for her own fraught family: “Rock’n’roll gave me the family environment I had been looking for."

Douglas' role in the crew quickly expanded. When AC/DC needed a PA system to support vocalist Bon Scott, Douglas was sent to collect one from a local sound company, and found herself promoted to the role of front-of-house sound engineer.

After 18 months, Douglas left AC/DC to join a production company that managed Australian tours for international acts: she was assigned to the lighting crew. Douglas worked for Suzi Quatro, Leo Sayer, Carlos Santana, Status Quo, Neil Diamond, and others on their Australian tours. She then moved to London and worked for Iggy Pop, Whitesnake, Ozzy Osbourne, The Police, and The Who on their European tours. When The Who played Wembley Stadium in 1979, the band specifically requested her for the show.

Although Douglas had no formal training ("my school was 'look and learn,'" she later remembered), she served in multiple roles as part of road crews: backline roadie, sound engineer, electrician, rigger, and lighting engineer. She developed new techniques in stage lighting, and her ideas for improving the way stage lighting is installed, employed, and maintained has contributed to the development of several commercial products.

== Memoir ==
In 2021, Douglas' memoir LOUD: A Life in Rock 'n' Roll by the World's First Female Roadie was published by HarperCollins. In it, Douglas offers details about: her early life, including her fractious relationship with her parents and her life as a runaway; her career start and trajectory; and the changes, both social and technical, that she observed during her decades as a touring professional. She also describes the physical and emotional cost of life on the road, including: mourning friends who died of drug overdose; fractured family relationships; accidents, injuries, and illness; and concealing her pregnancy from her crew-mates and the baby's father, and the painful custody battle that followed.

Douglas recounts various anecdotes, both comedic and dramatic, from her career:

- Wearing a tailored three-piece suit (after obtaining special permission for a woman to wear trousers) to run lights for Elton John at Prince Andrew’s 21st birthday party at Windsor Castle.
- Performing CPR on Bon Scott after an early-career overdose, saving his life years before his eventual death.
- Comforting a tearful Sharon Osbourne
- A half-serious proposal from George Harrison, who told her, "I would marry you tomorrow if you gave up smoking."
- Lending Iggy Pop her beloved leather jacket, which he later tossed into the audience, and which was never recovered.

Kirkus praised the memoir: "Candid and authentic, Douglas tells her remarkable story with strength and humor." Spin described the memoir as "irresistible." The audiobook edition, narrated by Douglas, also received positive attention for her storytelling style and “infectious laughter while talking through chaos,” according to ABC Radio Australia.

== Feminism and being "the first female" ==
In a 1978 interview with Record Mirror Magazine, Douglas noted that she was always the only woman roadie on the tours she worked. She endured sexist headlines, resentful female fans, heckling from the audience, and being mistaken for a groupie by security. It was many years before she encountered another female roadie on tour.

Douglas’s relationship with feminism was more pragmatic than political: while conscious of her status as "the first female," she has stated in interviews that during her career she "just wanted to do the job." Douglas attributed her success as a roadie, in part, to her unwillingness to seek or accept special favors or accommodations: "I fit in like a guy. I drank, stayed up late, cursed and loaded trucks just like everyone else," Douglas said.

She also made accommodations for others: “I very quickly became a crew chief and was in charge of people from different departments,” she recalled, “but you have to be more careful, because not every man wants to be told what to do by a woman.”

== Awards and legacy ==
In 2024, Douglas won the Live Production Touring Award from the Australian Women in Music Awards, which honors women in the Australian Music Industry who have made significant and lasting contributions in the field; she was also nominated that year for the Lifetime Achievement Award.

== Bibliography ==
Primary works

- Douglas, Tana (2021). Loud: A Life in Rock 'n' Roll by the World's First Female Roadie. HarperCollins/ABC Books. ISBN 978-0-7333-4090-1

Secondary works

- Coupe, Stuart (2018). Roadies: The Secret History of Australian Rock'n'Roll. Hachette Australia. ISBN 978-0-7336-3982-1. (Includes a dedicated chapter about Tana Douglas: "The First Woman.")

Articles and news

- Brandle, Lars (October 26, 2023). "Tana Douglas: Meet Australia's First Female Road Warrior." Rolling Stone Australia.
- Valentish, Jenny (January 31, 2021). "From sharehousing with AC/DC to comforting Sharon Osbourne: life as the world’s first female roadie." The Guardian.
- "Ground Breaker: Tana Douglas." SoundGirls. (Accessed February 18, 2026).
- Phillips, Greg (February 18, 2021). "Tana Douglas Relives Her Life as Australia's First Female Roadie in LOUD Memoir." Audiofemme.

Oral history and podcasts

- Douglas, Tana (2021). "NAMM Oral History Interview." NAMM Resource Center.
- "Tana Douglas: on being the world's first female roadie and working with legends." Stories Behind the Story with Better Reading. March 23, 2021.
- "Episode 211: Tana Douglas." Roadie Free Radio. February 24, 2020.
- “The First Female Roadie Finally Gets Her Say.” NPR, Weekend Edition. March 14, 2021.
- "Tana Douglas: Rock’n’Roll’s First Female Roadie." BBC. September 20, 2022.
