= Warner Chappell Music =

American music publishing company

Warner Chappell Music, Inc.
- Type: Subsidiary
- Industry: Music
- Predecessor: Chappell & Co.
- Founded: 1987; 39 years ago
- Headquarters: New York City, United States
- Area served: Worldwide
- Key people: Guy Moot (CEO, co-chair); Carianne Marshall (COO, co-chair)
- Services: Music publishing
- Parent: Warner Music Group
- Divisions: Warner Chappell Production Music
- Website: warnerchappell.com

Warner Chappell Music, Inc. (WCM) is an American music publishing company and a subsidiary of Warner Music Group. Warner Chappell Music's catalog consists of over two million compositions and 190,000 composers, with offices in over 40 countries.

It was formed in 1987 when Warner Music Group acquired Chappell & Co. and combined it with its existing music publishing division. Although the company previously had sheet music publishing activities, these were sold in 2005 and the company now focuses on music licensing, production music, and related services.

== History ==
=== Background ===
Chappell & Co., was a British music publishing company and instrument shop founded in 1811 in Bond Street, London, that specialised in piano manufacturing.

In 1929, Warner Bros. Pictures acquired M. Witmark & Sons, Remick Music Corporation and Harms, Inc. Later, they acquired Ager, Yellen, and Bornstein. Tamerlane Music (affiliated with Valiant Records) was acquired in 1969.

=== Merge ===
Warner Chappell Music was formed in San Antonio, Texas, in 1987, when Warner Music Group Chairman Chuck Kaye led the company to purchase Chappell & Co. from PolyGram (now Universal Music Group) (UMG).

In 1988, Warner-Chappell acquired Birch Tree Group (formerly Summy-Birchard), publisher of Happy Birthday to You, the Frances Clark piano method books, and former publisher of the Musical Courier.

In 1990, Warner Chappell acquired Mighty Three Music, the publishing company of Thom Bell and Gamble and Huff. The same year, Warner Chappell acquired the Canadian music publisher Gordon V. Thompson Music.

In 1994, Warner Bros. Publications expanded its print music operations by acquiring CPP/Belwin. CPP/Belwin had been the former print music arm of Columbia Pictures.

=== 2000s ===
In 2005, Warner Chappell Music sold most of its printed music division, Warner Bros. Publications, to Alfred Publishing.

In 2006 it launched the Pan European Digital Licensing (P.E.D.L.) initiative. In 2007, when Radiohead released In Rainbows through its website on a pay-what-you-wish model, Warner Chappell Music created a streamlined, one-of-a-kind licensing process for the songs on the album that allowed rights users around the world to secure use of the music from a single location.

In 2006, David H. Johnson was elevated to interim CEO and then in 2007 to Chairman & CEO of the company.

In November 2006, Disney Music Publishing and Warner Chappell agreed to a licensing agreement for Europe and South America major markets.

In 2007, the company acquired Non-Stop Music. Additionally, in 2010 it acquired 615 Music, a Nashville-based production music company, and subsequently united all the production music companies under the name Warner Chappell Production Music in 2012. In 2011, it acquired Southside Independent Music Publishing, whose songwriters included Bruno Mars, Brody Brown, and J.R. Rotem. In July 2012, Warner/Chappell purchased the music rights of the film studio Miramax Films.

=== 2010s ===
It was ranked in 2010 by Music & Copyright as the world's third-largest music publisher. Among the songs in the company's library are "Winter Wonderland" and formerly "Happy Birthday to You" until a 2013 lawsuit from filmmaker Jennifer Nelson successfully challenged the copyright, as Warner Chappell failed to demonstrate in 2015 that it had ever held a legal copyright to the lyrics. The company paid $14 million dollars to settle the lawsuit the following year, forgoing both an appeal and a trial to determine if Warner Chappell had improperly collected licensing fees. As a part of the settlement, it was ordered that "Happy Birthday to You" be declared public domain.

In January 2011, Cameron Strang, founder of New West Records and Southside Independent Music Publishing, was named CEO of Warner Chappell Music. He was succeeded by former company president Jon Platt in 2016.

Warner Chappell acquired Frank Gari's studio in 2015, adding to its production music library some of the most well-known television news music themes including those for local stations owned by ABC, CBS, and NBC.

On June 30, 2017, Warner Chappell Music filed a lawsuit against EMI Music Publishing, accusing the latter company of underpaying Warner Music for the royalties of the 20th Century Fox catalogue, which Warner acquired in 1982, as well as the rights to Curtis Mayfield and Kool and the Gang. This controversy arises from EMI's acquisition of Robbins and Feist in the early 1990s.

On January 9, 2019, Guy Moot was named CEO of Warner Chappell Music. He and Carianne Marshall, the company's COO, were appointed co-chairs.

On January 15, 2019, Warner Chappell Music filed a monetization claim against a fan film created by Star Wars YouTube channel Star Wars Theory but rescinded the claim two days later after intervention by Lucasfilm Ltd. on behalf of outraged fans. In May 2019, Warner Chappell Music was again criticized for filing overly broad copyright claims, concerning a large number of YouTube videos by Minecraft YouTuber Mumbo Jumbo, who has more than 9 million subscribers, for the sole reason that the intro song on all of them contained samples of a song that was copyrighted by Warner Chappell Music. The YouTuber had paid for a license to use the song, but it turned out that the samples had not been cleared. He stated that he intended to dispute Warner Chappell Music's claims, but that their large number (around 1800) would make this burdensome.

In May 2019, Warner Chappell acquired the Gene Autry Music Group, comprising four music publishers, 1,500 compositions (including "Back in the Saddle Again", "Here Comes Santa Claus", "Just Walkin' in the Rain", and "You Belong To Me"), and several of Autry's master recordings.

=== 2020s ===
In July 2021, Warner Chappell opened its first office in Vietnam.

On January 3, 2022, Variety reported that the estate of English musician David Bowie had sold the late artist's publishing catalog to Warner Chappell Music, "for a price upwards of $250 million".

On January 20, 2022, Warner Chappell signed a worldwide publishing agreement with ABS-CBN Music, the umbrella organization that houses the record label Star Music and its sub-labels, StarPop, Tarsier Records, DNA Music, and Old School Records. One of the biggest music producers in the Philippines, it has the largest catalogue of OPM music, including the international hits such as "Anak" by Freddie Aguilar and "Pangako Sa'yo" by Vina Morales.

In November 2023, it was announced that Warner Chappell had signed British singer songwriter Dido to distribute her discography catalogue and future music releases.
