= Kate Duncan (music executive) =

Australian music industry worker

- Years active: 2014–present
- Title: CEO

Kate Duncan is an Australian music industry worker, best known for being the CEO of the Victorian youth music organization The Push Inc.

== Career ==
Duncan's early roles included stints within local government in Melbourne, working as a youth projects officer.

She started working with The Push Inc in 2016 as the organization's creative producer. In February 2018, Duncan was listed in theMusic.com.au's Power 50 at #44, and in May of the same year, Duncan was announced as the incoming CEO.

Following her recruitment as CEO, Duncan stated "I am completely honoured and super excited to have the opportunity to lead Victoria’s peak youth music organisation into its next chapter. After 30 years of incorporation, it is time for The Push to redefine our positioning as a relevant and dynamic organisation in fostering Victoria’s future generations of music industry leaders and audiences."

== Awards and nominations ==
=== Australian Women in Music Awards ===
The Australian Women in Music Awards is an annual event that celebrates outstanding women in the Australian Music Industry who have made significant and lasting contributions in their chosen field. They commenced in 2018.

Year	Nominee / work	Award	Result
2026	Kate Duncan	Music Advocacy Award	Nominated

=== National Live Music Awards ===
The National Live Music Awards (NLMAs) commenced in 2016 to recognise contributions to the live music industry in Australia.

Year	Nominee / work	Award	Result
2018	Kate Duncan - The Push	Victorian All Ages Achievement	Won
