= Emma Memma =

2022 album by Emma Memma

Studio album by Emma Memma
- Released: 2 September 2022
- Genre: Children's
- Length: 11:59
- Label: Emma Memma

Emma Memma chronology
Emma Memma (2022)	Ballet Time (2023)

Emma Memma is the debut studio album by Australian children's entertainer Emma Watkins, under the character alias, Emma Memma. The album was released on 2 September 2022 and peaked at number 35 on the ARIA Charts.

At the AIR Awards of 2023, the album was nominated for Best Independent Children's Album or EP.

At the ARIA Music Awards of 2023, the album won Best Children's Album.

== Track listing ==
All songs written by Emma Watkins and Oliver Brian (except "Happy Birthday!")

1. "Emma Memma" - 0:42
2. "Twirly Tuesday" - 1:01
3. "Hello, How Are You?" - 1:59
4. "Wombat Wednesday" - 0:56
5. "I Love You" - 1:29
6. "Green Planes" - 1:13
7. "Up and Down" - 0:58
8. "1, 2, 3, 4, 5 Stars" - 1:21
9. "Clap, Clap, Clap" - 1:18
10. "Happy Birthday!" - 1:00
11. "Butterfly Goodbye" - 0:58

== Charts ==
Chart performance for Emma Memma
Chart (2022)	Peak position
Australian Albums (ARIA)	35
