= Rupa Marya =

Doctor in California, US

Rupa Marya M.D.
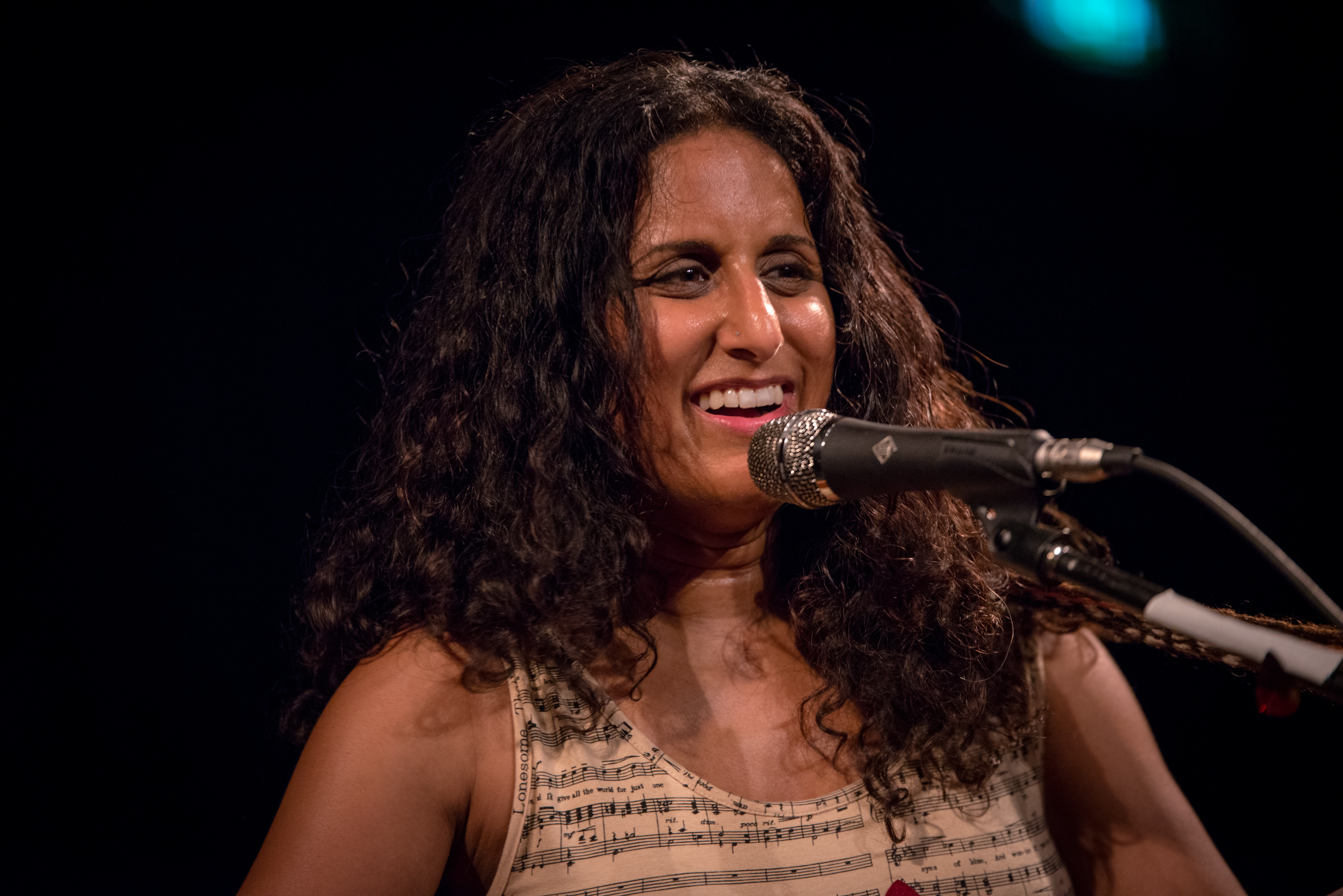
- Education: Georgetown University School of Medicine
- Medical career
- Profession: Doctor, writer, activist, musician
- Field: Hospitalist, social justice
- Institutions: UCSF School of Medicine
- Notable works: Inflamed: Deep Medicine and the Anatomy of Injustice
- Website: https://rupamarya.org/

Rupa Marya is a doctor, activist, musician and writer based in San Francisco. She was a professor of medicine at the UCSF School of Medicine, until suspended for what the university defined as antisemitism. Marya has since filed two lawsuits against the university on the basis of freedom of speech and civil rights.

She co-authored the 2021 book Inflamed: Deep Medicine and the Anatomy of Injustice (with Raj Patel).

== Early life and education ==
Marya was born in California to Indian immigrant parents. Her childhood was spent in the United States, France, and India. She was raised in the Sikh religious tradition.

She attended the University of California San Diego, 1993-1997, earning degrees in theater and in molecular biology, before attending Georgetown University School of Medicine, receiving her MD in 2002. In 2003, she attended the Salt Institute for Documentary Studies. After she finished her medical residency at UCSF in 2007, she became a hospitalist at UCSF and also began writing and performing music.

== Career ==
Marya was recognized in 2021 with the Women Leaders in Medicine Award by the American Medical Student Association. She was a reviewer of the American Medical Association's Organizational Strategic Plan to Embed Racial Justice and Advance Health Equity. In 2019, Marya was among the physicians appointed by Governor Gavin Newsom to the Healthy California for All Commission.

=== Medical student controversy and firing ===
Rupa Marya, MD
(@DrRupaMarya)
tweeted:

Med students at UCSF are concerned that a first year student from Israel is in their class. They're asking if he participated in the genocide of Palestinians in the IDF before matriculating into medical school in CA. How do we address this in our professional ranks?

21 September 2024

In September 2024, Marya was suspended from her roles by UCSF after she sent out a social media post that was described by the university as "targeting" of students. Marya had tweeted that medical students at USCF were concerned about the presence on campus of a first-year Israeli medical student because they may have been a member of the Israel Defense Forces (IDF) and therefore, could have been involved in Israeli war crimes in the Gaza war. Due to conscription in Israel, every Israeli citizen over the age of 18 who is Jewish, Druze or Circassian must serve in the Israel Defense Forces, with some exceptions.

UCSF publicly labeled her posts as antisemitic, and the university suspended Marya for what it called "the targeting of students on social media based on their national origin". Marya said her suspension was because of her "support for the liberation of Palestinians who are suffering genocide", and maintained that she was the victim of a targeted harassment campaign by pro-Israel groups. Marya had previously faced backlash for criticizing the impact of Zionism on health care, having described it as an "impediment to health equity" and a "supremacist, racist ideology".

The university later reinstated Marya's clinical care responsibilities, while maintaining her ban from campus and the UCSF hospital.

In May 2025, UCSF fired Marya. The following month, she filed two lawsuits against the university, alleging violations of freedom of speech and civil rights.

== Activism ==
Marya has said her sense of justice was awakened in childhood as she witnessed class differences in India, and learned about colonization and genocide perpetrated against Native Americans in the United States. She is involved in numerous organizations working at the intersection of social justice and health, including the Do No Harm Coalition and Deep Medicine Circle.

Marya has been vocal on social media as well as in her capacity as a medical professional regarding violations of Palestinian human rights. After Dr. Avromi Kanal sent an email to hospital staff arguing against a cease-fire resolution, Marya publicly described this email as an "expression of anti-Arab hate" that prompted doctors of South Asian and North African descent "to say they do not feel safe in his presence."

== Music ==
Marya is the composer and front-woman of the band Rupa & the April Fishes and was a lead plaintiff in the lawsuit that brought the song "Happy Birthday to You" back to the public domain.

Rupa & the April Fishes' debut album, "Extraordinary Rendition", reflects on the societal impact of the September 11 attacks, while her subsequent album, "Este Mundo," draws from her interactions with undocumented immigrants facing severe health challenges. In "Este Mundo," Rupa's lyrics explore themes of longing, loss, and love, maintaining a thoughtful and intimate perspective. Her music incorporates influences from jazz, tango, klezmer, Latin American, and Balkan music.
