= Greeting Prelude =

1955 orchestral work by Igor Stravinsky

- by Igor Stravinsky
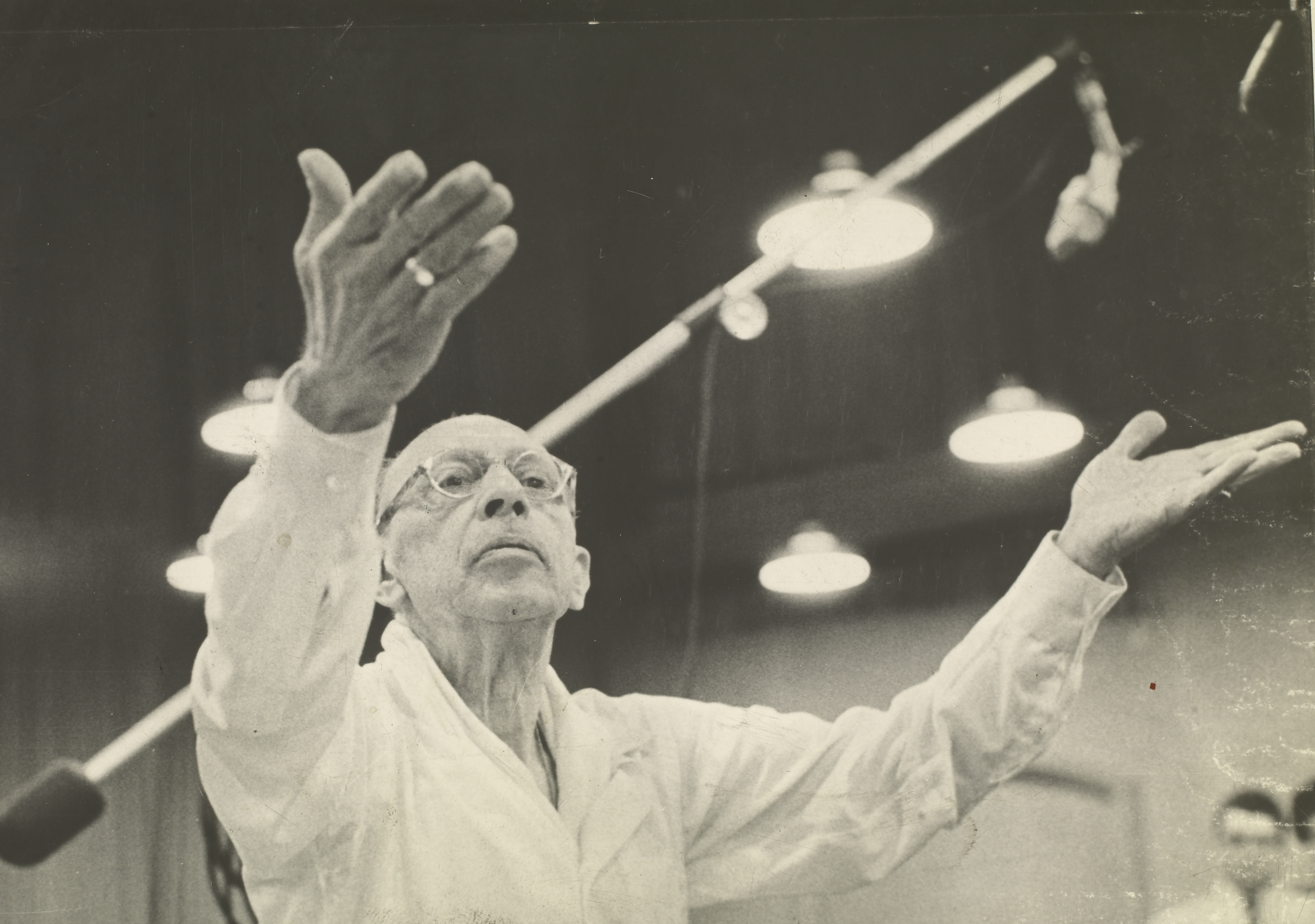
- Stravinsky in 1962
- Dedication: For the 80th birthday of Pierre Monteux
- Published: 1956
- Publisher: Boosey & Hawkes
- Duration: c. 45 seconds
- Scoring: Orchestra

Premiere
- Date: April 4, 1955
- Location: Symphony Hall, Boston
- Conductor: Charles Munch
- Performers: Boston Symphony Orchestra

The Greeting Prelude is an orchestral work composed in 1955 by Igor Stravinsky. Its origins can be traced back to an incident that occurred during a rehearsal at the inaugural Aspen Festival in 1950, when Stravinsky was displeased by a surprise rendition of "Happy Birthday to You", a song with which he was unfamiliar. The next year, at the request of Samuel Barber, he harmonized it and composed a two-part canon as a birthday present for Mary Louise Curtis. In February 1955, Charles Munch, music director of the Boston Symphony Orchestra, contacted Stravinsky with a request for a brief orchestral tribute for Pierre Monteux's 80th birthday. After initially expressing uncertainty that he could accept the commission, he composed Greeting Prelude between February 18 and 23.

Its world premiere performance took place at Symphony Hall, Boston, on April 4, 1955, with the Boston Symphony Orchestra conducted by Munch, as part of a program shared with Monteux. Immediate reactions to the brief work, which treats the "Happy Birthday" theme serially within a diatonic harmonic context, were positive. Leonard Bernstein and Colin Davis conducted the Greeting Prelude in 1962 in tribute to Stravinsky's 80th birthday that year; the former on the CBS television series Young People's Concerts, in an episode devoted to the composer.

Cyrus Durgin of the Boston Globe described the Greeting Prelude as "a kind of perpetual motion which has no conclusion". Musicologist Eric Walter White called it a "jovial, aphoristic work, but rather too short to make much effect". Stravinsky himself said that it was a "very learned prelude" and "a kind of singing telegram".

== Background ==
=== Surprise ===
One of the few events that interrupted Igor Stravinsky's work on The Rake's Progress in 1950 were engagements to conduct two concerts at the inaugural Aspen Festival in July. During a rehearsal, he was taken aback when his downbeat did not produce the result he expected:

I started a rehearsal of Tchaikovsky's Second Symphony, but instead of the doleful Russian horn melody, I heard this happy little tune ("Happy Birthday to You"). I had no idea what happened and did not understand the point (which was that one of the orchestra players had just become a father); until a certain time had been spent in diplomacy, in fact, I was actually piqued.

Stravinsky had been unfamiliar with "Happy Birthday to You", but remembered it after this occasion. The following year, in June 1951, he encountered the song again when Samuel Barber asked him to harmonize it as a 75th birthday present for Mary Louise Curtis. He complied and composed a two-part canon based on the melody.

=== Pierre Monteux's 80th birthday ===
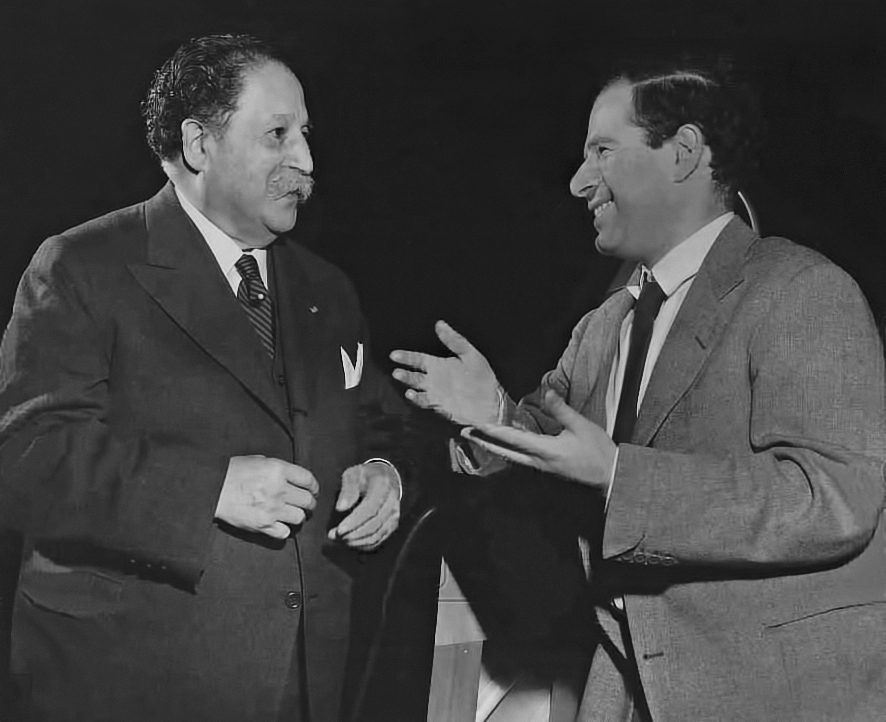
Pierre Monteux (left) in 1953

In 1954, Stravinsky received a commission from the Venice Biennale to compose a choral work based on sacred texts, with a premiere at St. Mark's Basilica tentatively scheduled for an undetermined date between September 1954 and 1955. By February 1955, however, they had still not finalized his contract, which left the composer in a state that musicologist Stephen Walsh described as "creative limbo".

As Stravinsky awaited confirmation from the festival bureaucracy, he received a letter early that month from Charles Munch, music director of the Boston Symphony Orchestra. The conductor requested a brief orchestral work to commemorate the 80th birthday in April of former Boston Symphony music director Pierre Monteux. The composer and elder conductor, who conducted the premieres of Petrushka and The Rite of Spring, had a longstanding professional relationship, despite periods of acrimony. Although Stravinsky wrote to Munch on February 9 that he was uncertain he could fulfill the task, he began to compose the Greeting Prelude on February 18. He completed it on February 23 and mailed the score to the New York City office of Boosey & Hawkes that same day. The score was published in 1956.

== Music ==
The Greeting Prelude—which is modeled after Anton Webern's orchestration of the "Ricercar à 6" from The Musical Offering by Johann Sebastian Bach—begins with the "Happy Birthday" theme played by horns and piano, with strings repeating each statement in diminution. These are then treated using serial devices, but within a diatonic harmonic context. The middle section follows, with the theme played by bassoons, tuba, and double-basses juxtaposed against a rhythmically reshaped version played by violins and cellos in canon. After three measures, the second violins split from the first into free counterpoint, at the same time the violas begin with an inverted version of the theme played in retrograde. The piece concludes with a restatement of the opening on horns and piano, followed by the strings.

Stravinsky told the Pittsburgh Post-Gazette that the work was a "very learned prelude, all fugue and canon", and later also described it as "a kind of singing telegram". A typical performance lasts approximately 45 seconds.

=== Instrumentation ===
The instrumentation for the Greeting Prelude is as follows:

Woodwinds

3 flutes
2 oboes
2 clarinets
3 bassoons

Brass

4 French horns
2 trumpets
3 trombones
tuba

Percussion

timpani
bass drum
piano

Strings

1st violins
2nd violins
violas
cellos
double basses

=== Manuscript ===
Holograph sketches and score are in the possession of the Paul Sacher Foundation. These consist of four pages of sketches in pencil and seven pages of the final draft in ink.

== Premiere ==
The world premiere of the Greeting Prelude took place at Symphony Hall, Boston, on April 4, 1955, with the Boston Symphony Orchestra conducted by Munch. It shared the program with another birthday tribute commissioned for the occasion, Pensée amicale, by Darius Milhaud. The first half of the concert was conducted by Monteux and replicated the corresponding part of his first concert as conductor with the Colonne Orchestra.

== Reception ==
Immediate reaction to the Greeting Prelude was positive. Cyrus Durgin, music critic for the Boston Globe, reported that the work was received with "much applause, bows, and cheers":

This, beginning with a terrific thwack of drums, and punctuated by them as if by celebration gunfire, was just a trace in the manner of Stravinsky's The Rite of Spring, that historic piece in whose tumultuous premiere both Monteux and Stravinsky were actively concerned. By the abrupt ending, you might judge that the Greeting Prelude was some kind of perpetual motion which has no conclusion. And that too was highly appropriate in symbolic application to Mr. Monteux's career.

Robert Craft conducted it on May 22, 1955, at the Ojai Music Festival, where it was also received warmly by audiences and critics.

Programs celebrating Stravinsky's 80th birthday in 1962 included performances of the Greeting Prelude. It was played by the New York Philharmonic conducted by Leonard Bernstein on their CBS television series, Young People's Concerts, in an episode celebrating Stravinsky. On August 28, it was played by the London Symphony Orchestra on a Proms Stravinsky birthday tribute concert, conducted by Colin Davis.

In his study of Stravinsky's music, musicologist Eric Walter White called the Greeting Prelude a "brief jeu d'esprit" and a "jovial, aphoristic work, but rather too short to make much effect".

=== Copyright problem ===
Similar to what occurred with the incorporation of the song "Une Jambe de bois" into the score of Petrushka, Stravinsky mistakenly believed that "Happy Birthday" was not under copyright—an "expensive error", according to Craft. A sizable part of the royalties from performances of Greeting Prelude were awarded to the rights holders of "Happy Birthday".
