= Inflamed: Deep Medicine and the Anatomy of Injustice =

2021 book

- Author: Rupa Marya, Raj Patel
- Language: English
- Publication date: 2021

Inflamed: Deep Medicine and the Anatomy of Injustice (2021) is a book by Rupa Marya and Raj Patel.

The book discusses how healthcare outcomes vary drastically based on socioeconomic background. For example, when the COVID-19 pandemic was first located in China, the effects of the virus were worse on socially oppressed groups such as farm workers and self-employed people. It notes that modern medicine was developed alongside colonialism, and talks about how our capitalist economic system, which is focused on making money, treats the planet and our bodies as disposable commodities, arguing that everyone should have the right to be healthy, but our society values taking things from the Earth and using people for work more than our well-being. The book also links this to global warming caused by climate change and its effect on indigenous people.

== See also ==
- Racism in medicine
- Social impact of the COVID-19 pandemic
- Xenophobia and racism related to the COVID-19 pandemic
