= Teenage Boss =

Australian TV Series

- Logo used since season 3
- Also known as: Teenage Boss: Next Level
- Genre: Documentary
- Presented by: Eddie Woo; Emma Watkins
- Country of origin: Australia
- Original language: English
- No. of seasons: 5
- No. of episodes: 60

Production
- Executive producers: John McAvoy; Colin Thrupp
- Producers: Ash Dunn; David Dutton; Prue Hamill
- Production company: McAvoy Media

Original release
- Network: ABC Me
- Release: 24 June 2018 – 31 August 2020
- Network: ABC Family
- Release: 12 October 2024 – present

Teenage Boss (known as Teenage Boss: Next Level since season 3) is an Australian reality television series, based on a Norwegian format. It originally aired on ABC ME and was hosted by mathematician Eddie Woo and produced by McAvoy Media. The series sees a range of teenagers from diverse families put in charge of the monthly budget to teach them about financial responsibility and planning.

The first season premiered on 24 June 2018 and a second season premiered on 31 August 2020. Emma Watkins hosts the third season, titled Teenage Boss: Next Level. All episodes of the third season premiered on ABC iview on 11 October 2024. Weekly episodes were aired from 12 October 2024 on ABC Family. A fourth season with Watkins returning as host aired on 26 July 2025. Auditions for a fifth season opened in December 2025, and the season began airing on 1 August 2026.

== Series overview ==
Season	Episodes	Originally released	
Season	Episodes	First released	Last released
1	15	24 June 2018	30 September 2018
2	15	31 August 2020	
3	10	12 October 2024	7 December 2024
4	10	26 July 2025	27 September 2025
5	10	1 August 2026	3 October 2026
