= Happy Birthday to You =

American birthday song

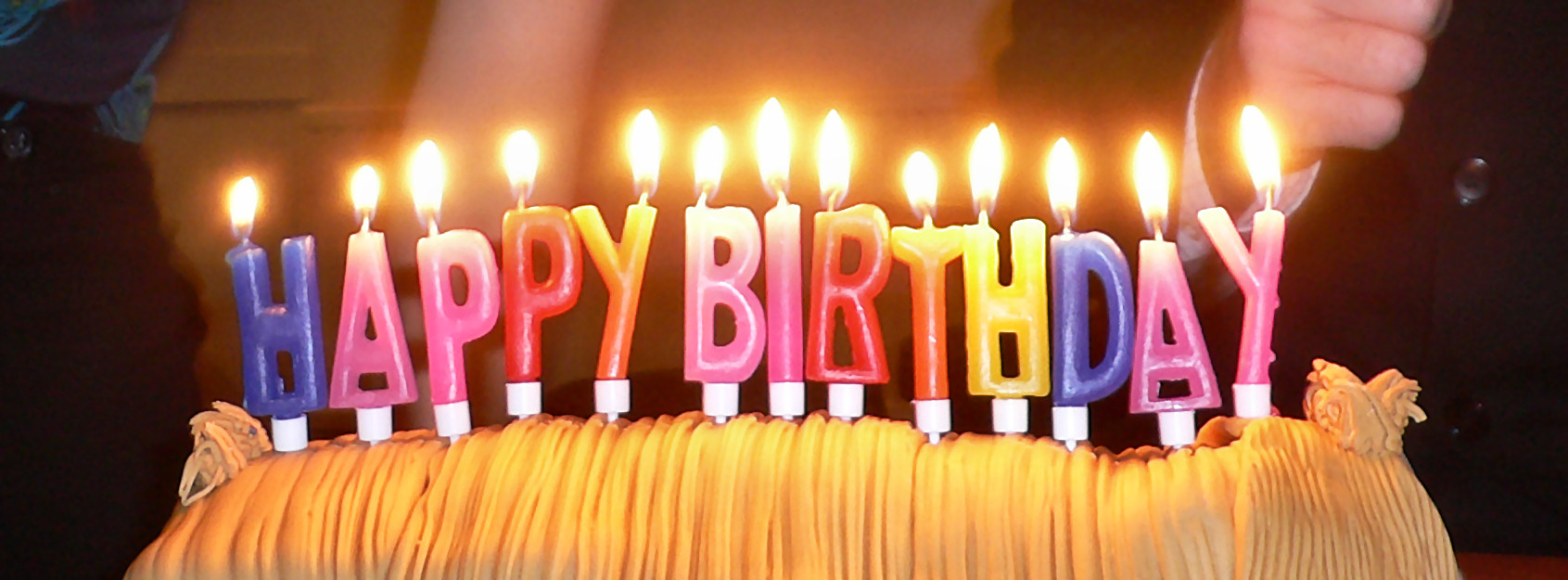
- Candles spelling "Happy birthday", one of many types of birthday cake decorations that accompany this song

Song
- Published: 1893
- Songwriters: Patty S. Hill; Mildred J. Hill

"Happy Birthday to You" song melody

"Happy Birthday to You", or simply "Happy Birthday", is an American song traditionally sung to celebrate a person's birthday. According to the 1998 Guinness World Records, it is the most recognized song in the English language, followed by "For He's a Jolly Good Fellow". The song's base lyrics have been translated into at least 18 languages. The melody of "Happy Birthday to You" comes from the song "Good Morning to All", which has traditionally been attributed to American sisters Patty and Mildred J. Hill in 1893, although the claim that the sisters composed the tune is disputed.

The song is in the public domain in the United States and the European Union. Warner Chappell Music had previously claimed copyright on the song in the US and collected licensing fees for its use; in 2015, the copyright claim was declared invalid, and in 2016, Warner Chappell agreed to pay back $14 million in licensing fees.

== History ==
Patty Hill was a kindergarten principal in Louisville, Kentucky, developing teaching methods at the Little Loomhouse; her sister Mildred was a pianist and composer. The sisters used "Good Morning to All" as a song that young children would find easy to sing. The combination of melody and lyrics in "Happy Birthday to You" first appeared in print in 1912. None of the early appearances of the "Happy Birthday to You" lyrics included credits or copyright notices. The Summy Company registered a copyright in 1935, crediting authors Preston Ware Orem and Mrs. R. R. Forman. In 1988, Warner/Chappell Music purchased the company owning the copyright for US$25 million, with the value of "Happy Birthday" estimated at US$5 million. Warner claimed that the United States copyright would not expire until 2030 and that unauthorized public performances of the song were illegal unless royalties were paid. In February 2010, the royalty for a single use was US$700. By one estimate, the song is the highest-earning single song in history. In the European Union, the copyright for the song expired on January 1, 2017.

The American copyright status of "Happy Birthday to You" began to draw more attention with the passage of the Copyright Term Extension Act in 1998. The Supreme Court upheld the Act in Eldred v. Ashcroft in 2003, and Associate Justice Stephen Breyer specifically mentioned "Happy Birthday to You" in his dissenting opinion. American law professor Robert Brauneis extensively researched the song and concluded in 2010 "it is almost certainly no longer under copyright." Good Morning to You Productions sued Warner/Chappell for falsely claiming copyright to the song in 2013. In September 2015, a federal judge declared that the Warner/Chappell copyright claim was invalid, ruling that the copyright registration applied only to a specific piano arrangement of the song and not to its lyrics and melody. In 2016, Warner/Chappell settled for $14 million, and the court declared that "Happy Birthday to You" was in the public domain.

== Lyrics ==
=== "Happy birthday to you" ===
The person whose birthday is being celebrated is filled in for "[NAME]".

Happy birthday to you
Happy birthday to you
Happy birthday, dear [NAME]
Happy birthday to you.

Since the syllable lengths and scansion of people's names may vary, the measure that includes the [NAME] invocation is traditionally notated with a fermata to adapt the meter.

=== Traditional variations ===
Among English-speakers, it is traditional at a birthday party for the guests celebrating the birthday to sing the song "Happy Birthday to You" to the birthday person, often when presenting a birthday cake. After the song is sung, party guests sometimes add wishes like "and many more!" expressing the hope that the birthday person will enjoy a long life. In the United Kingdom, Ireland, Australia, New Zealand, South Africa, and most of the Commonwealth, immediately after "Happy Birthday" has been sung, it is traditional for one of the guests to lead with "Hip hip ..." and then for all of the other guests to join in and say "... hooray!". This cheer is normally given three times.

In regions of America and Canada, especially at young children's birthdays, immediately after "Happy Birthday" has been sung, it is not uncommon for the singers to segue into "How old are you now? How old are you now? How old are you now, how old are you now?" and then count up: "Are you one? Are you two? Are you ..." until they reach the right age or often, instead of counting, "and many more!" for those who are older.

== Copyright status ==
The public domain song "Good-Morning to All"

Instrumental version of "Good Morning to All"

Music and lyrics of the song "Good Morning to All", with third verse "Happy Birthday to You", printed in 1912 in The Beginners' Book of Songs with Instruction

Music and lyrics of the song "Good Morning to All", with third verse "Happy Birthday to You", printed in 1915 in The Golden Book of Favorite Songs

The music and lyrics are in the public domain in the European Union and the United States. The copyright expired in the European Union on January 1, 2017. A U.S. federal court ruled in 2016 that Warner and Chappell's copyright claim was invalid and there was no other claim to copyright.

"Happy Birthday to You" dates from the late 19th century, when sisters Patty and Mildred J. Hill introduced the song "Good Morning to All" to Patty's kindergarten class in Kentucky. They published the tune in their 1893 songbook Song Stories for the Kindergarten with Chicago publisher Clayton F. Summy. Kembrew McLeod stated that the Hill sisters likely copied the tune and lyrical idea from other popular and similar nineteenth-century songs, including Horace Waters' "Happy Greetings to All" from 1858, "Good Night to You All", also from 1858, "A Happy New Year to All" from 1875, and "A Happy Greeting to All", published 1885. However, U.S. law professor Robert Brauneis disputes this, noting that these earlier songs had quite different melodies.

The complete text of "Happy Birthday to You" first appeared in print as the final four lines of Edith Goodyear Alger's poem "Roy's Birthday", published in A Primer of Work and Play, copyrighted by D. C. Heath in 1901, with no reference to the words being sung. The first book including "Happy Birthday to You" lyrics set to the tune of "Good Morning to All" that bears a date of publication is The Elementary Worker and His Work, from 1911, but earlier references exist to a song called "Happy Birthday to You", including an article from 1901 in the Inland Educator and Indiana School Journal. In 1924, Robert Coleman included "Good Morning to All" in a songbook with the birthday lyrics as a second verse. Coleman also published "Happy Birthday" in The American Hymnal in 1933. Children's Praise and Worship published the song in 1928, edited by Byers, Byrum, and Koglin.

The Summy Company, publisher of "Good Morning to All", copyrighted piano arrangements by Preston Ware Orem and a second verse by Mrs. R. R. Forman. This served as the legal basis for the claim that Summy Company legally registered the copyright for the song, as well as the later renewal of these copyrights.

Summy Company became the Summy–Birchard Company in 1957, and this became a division of Birch Tree Group Limited in 1970. Warner/Chappell Music acquired Birch Tree Group Limited in 1988 for US$25 million. The company continued to insist that one could not sing the "Happy Birthday to You" lyrics for profit without paying royalties; in 2008, Warner collected about US$5,000 per day (US$2 million per year) in royalties for the song. Warner/Chappell claimed copyright for every use in film, television, radio, and anywhere open to the public, and for any group where a substantial number of those in attendance were not family or friends of the performer. Brauneis cited problems with the song's authorship and the notice and renewal of the copyright, and concluded: "It is almost certainly no longer under copyright."

In the European Union, copyright lasts for the life of the author plus 70 years. Patty Hill died in 1946 as the last surviving author, so the copyright expired in these countries on January 1, 2017.

=== 2013 lawsuit ===
On June 13, 2013, documentary filmmaker Jennifer Nelson filed a putative class action suit in federal court for the Southern District of New York against Warner/Chappell in the name of her production company Good Morning to You Productions. She had paid US$1,500 to secure the rights as part of a documentary that she was making about the song and its history. Her complaint relied heavily on Brauneis's research, and sought the return of her money and all royalties collected by the company from other filmmakers since 2009. A week later, Rupa Marya v. Warner Chappell Music Inc was filed in the Central District of California. Five weeks later, Nelson refiled the case there, and the cases were combined. In April 2014, Warner's motion to dismiss had been denied without prejudice, and discovery began under an agreed plan with respect to Claim One, declaratory judgment as to whether "Happy Birthday to You" was in the public domain. The court was expected to rule on the motion for summary judgment as to the merits issues on Claim One. A jury trial was requested.

Nelson's attorneys Betsy Manifold and Mark Rifkin presented new evidence on July 28, 2015, one day before a scheduled ruling, which they argued was conclusive proof that the song was in the public domain, "thus making it unnecessary for the Court to decide the scope or validity of the disputed copyrights, much less whether Patty Hill abandoned any copyright she may have had to the lyrics". They had been given access to documents previously held back from them by Warner/Chappell, which included a copy of the 15th edition of The Everyday Song Book published in 1927. The book contained "Good Morning and Happy Birthday", but the copy was blurry, obscuring a line of text below the title. Manifold and Rifkin located a clearer copy of an edition published in 1922 that also contained the "Happy Birthday" lyrics. The previously obscured line was revealed to be the credit "Special permission through courtesy of The Clayton F Summy Co." Manifold and Rifkin argued that the music and lyrics were published without a valid copyright notice as was required at the time, so "Happy Birthday" was in the public domain.

Warner/Chappell disputed the evidence, arguing that, unless there was "necessary authorization from the copyright owner", the "Happy Birthday" lyrics and sheet music would still be subject to common law copyright as an unpublished work, and that it was unknown whether the "special permission" from the Summy Company covered "Good Morning to All", "Happy Birthday to You", or both, thus alleging that the publication in The Everyday Song Book was unauthorized. The company also argued that it was not acting in bad faith in withholding the evidence of the 1927 publication.

On September 22, 2015, federal judge George H. King ruled that the Warner/Chappell copyright claim over the lyrics was invalid. The 1935 copyright held by Warner/Chappell applied only to a specific piano arrangement of the song, not the lyrics or melody. The court held that the question of whether the 1922 and 1927 publications were authorized, thus placing the song in the public domain, presented questions of fact that would need to be resolved at trial. However, Warner/Chappell had failed to prove that it actually had ever held a copyright to the lyrics, so the court was able to grant summary judgment to the plaintiffs, thus resolving the case.

Some initial news sources characterized the decision as ruling that the song was in the public domain, but the decision did not go so far, holding only that Warner/Chappell did not prove they owned the copyright. However, as there were no other claimants to the copyright, and the copyright to the melody had long ago expired, the plaintiffs suggested that the song was de facto in the public domain. Also, the judge ruled that the song was not copyrighted by Summy Co., who had written in the song book, "Special permission through courtesy of the Clayton F. Summy Co." Since there was no evidence Summy Co. had copyright on the song, the song is still considered to be in the public domain.

Before the lawsuit, Warner/Chappell had been earning $2 million a year licensing the song for commercial use, with a notable example the $5,000 paid by the filmmakers of the 1994 documentary Hoop Dreams in order to safely distribute the film. On February 8, 2016, Warner/Chappell agreed to pay a settlement of $14 million to those who had licensed the song, and would allow a final judgment declaring the song to be in the public domain, with a final hearing scheduled in March 2016. On June 30, 2016, the final settlement was officially granted and the court declared that the song was in the public domain. The following week, Nelson's short-form documentary Happy Birthday: My Campaign to Liberate the People's Song was published online by The Guardian.

In the wake of their success, the lawyers involved in the "Happy Birthday" lawsuit filed similar lawsuits regarding "We Shall Overcome" and "This Land Is Your Land".

== Public performances ==
One of the most famous performances of "Happy Birthday to You" was Marilyn Monroe's rendition to US President John F. Kennedy in May 1962. Another notable use was by comedy pianist Victor Borge, who played the song in the styles of various composers, or would begin playing Moonlight Sonata, smoothly transitioning into the song.

The Beatles recorded "Happy Birthday Dear Saturday Club" for the BBC's radio programme's fifth anniversary. This recording is included on the compilation album On Air – Live at the BBC Volume 2, released in 2013.

In the 1987 documentary Eyes on the Prize about the U.S. civil rights movement, there was a birthday party scene in which Dr. Martin Luther King Jr.'s discouragement began to lift. After its initial release, the film was unavailable for sale or broadcast for many years because of the cost of clearing many copyrights, of which "Happy Birthday to You" was one. Grants in 2005 for copyright clearances allowed PBS to rebroadcast the film.

In 2010, the Western classical music conductor Zubin Mehta conducted the orchestra to play variations of "Happy Birthday" in the styles of various Western classical music composers, including Wagner, Bach, Mozart and Beethoven, and in the Viennese, New Orleans and Hungarian composition styles.

On May 10, 2024, composer Karl Jenkins was conducting a performance of the Royal Scottish National Orchestra at the Royal Albert Hall as part of his 80th birthday celebrations when the orchestra suddenly broke out into playing "Happy Birthday to You" instead of Palladio as Jenkins had planned.

== See also ==
- List of birthday songs
- "The ABC Song"
- Copyfraud
- Copyright troll
- Greeting Prelude, an orchestral work by Igor Stravinsky based on "Happy Birthday"
