= Extraordinary Rendition Band =

Marching band in Providence, RI, US

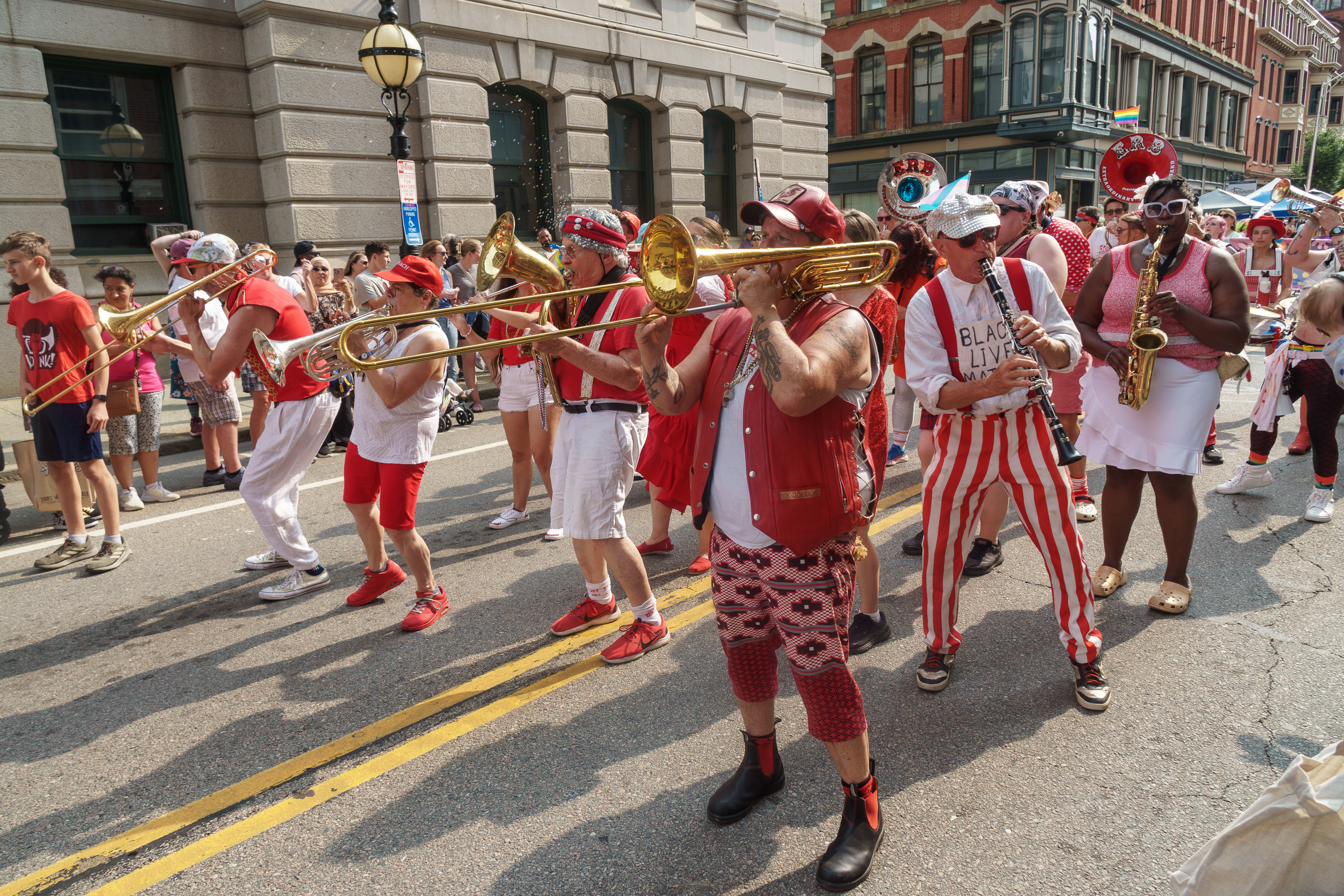
- At PVDFest 2025

Background information
- Origin: Providence, Rhode Island
- Genres: Brass band/Marching band
- Years active: 2009–present
- Website: extraordinaryrenditionband.com

Extraordinary Rendition Band

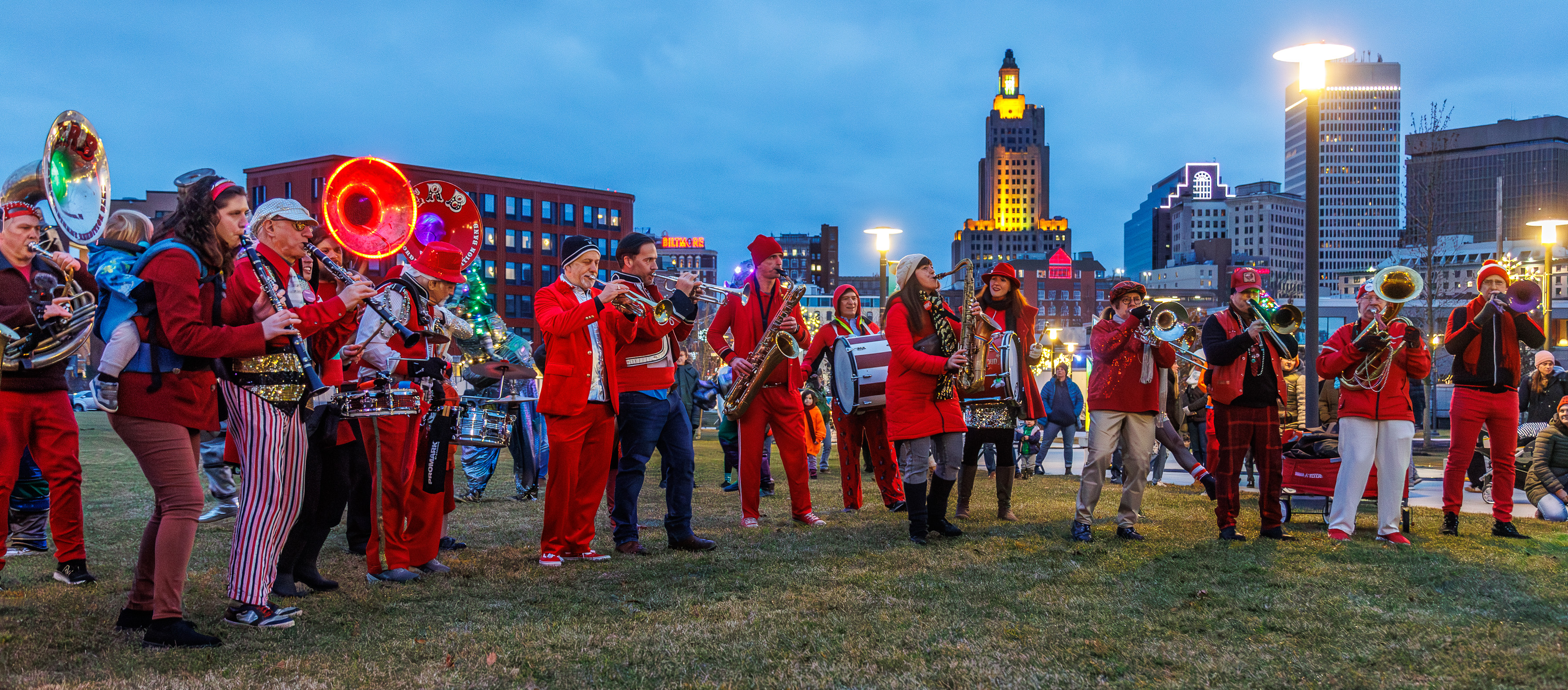
Lumina Festival, 2024

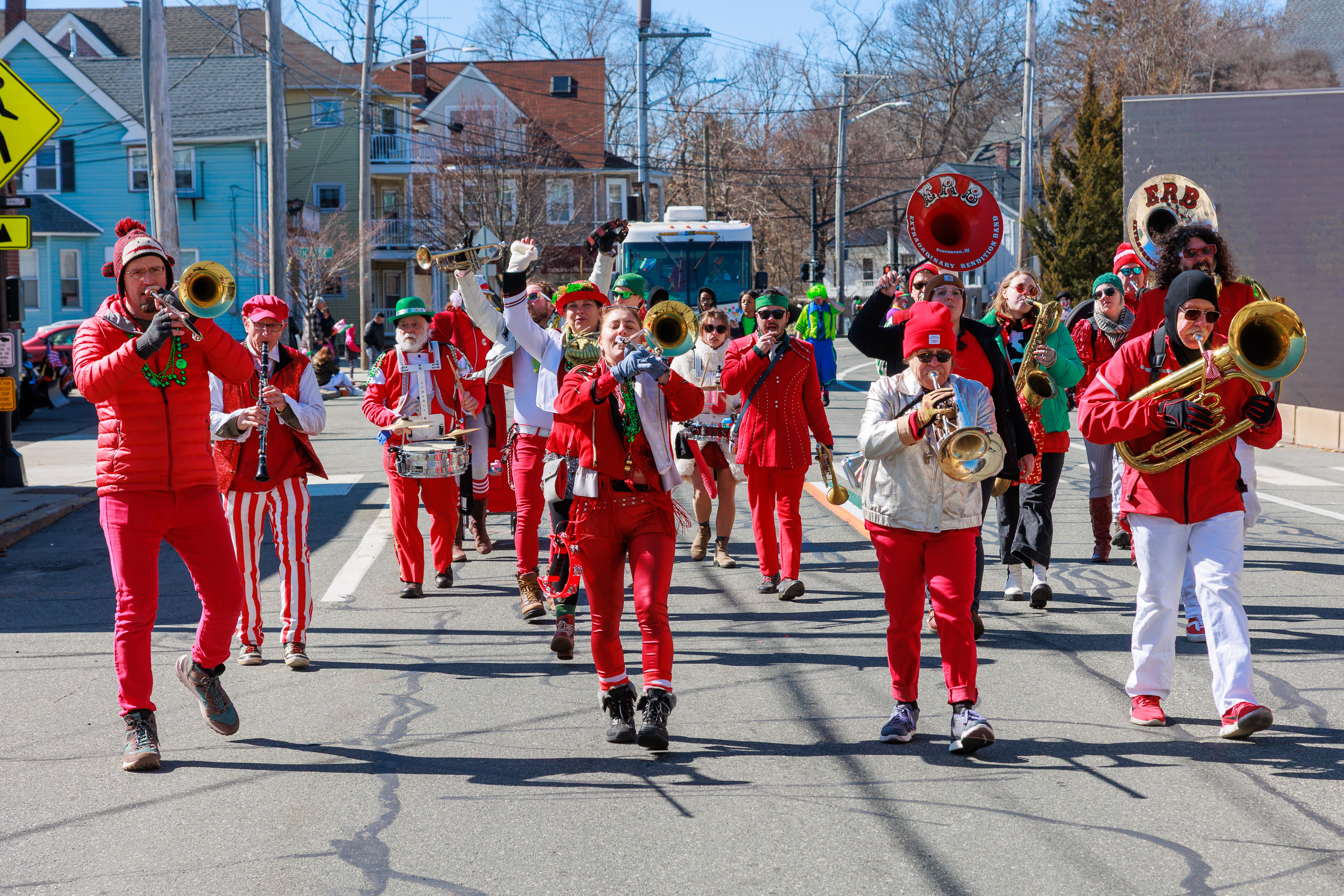
2025 Saint Patrick's Day Parade

The Extraordinary Rendition Band (ERB) is a protest marching band from Providence, Rhode Island with approximately 30 active members.

The band plays original compositions by its members as well as music of New Orleans and arrangements of music ranging from funk to cumbia and metal. The instrumentation of the band varies but includes percussion, brass, woodwinds, and instruments less commonly found in marching bands, such as accordions and washboards. An activist street band, ERB frequently appears at protests in support of human and civil rights. The band states its aim is to instigate "spontaneous moments of raucous musical joy."

The band functions as a collective and avoids having a leader. The band's name is a double entendre: it refers to the versions of the songs the band plays at the same time as it intentionally draws critical attention to the practice of “extraordinary rendition,” the government-sanctioned practice of extrajudicial abduction carried out during the George W. Bush administration.

Extraordinary Rendition Band regularly plays at Providence events PVDFest and PRONK; the band has also participated in HONK! in Somerville, Massachusetts, HONK Ontario, HONK Texas, HONK Fest West (Seattle), Pittonkatonk (Pittsburgh), Crash Detroit, Salt City HONK, and at Mardi Gras in Louisiana.
