= Kate Duncan (furniture maker) =

Canadian furniture maker

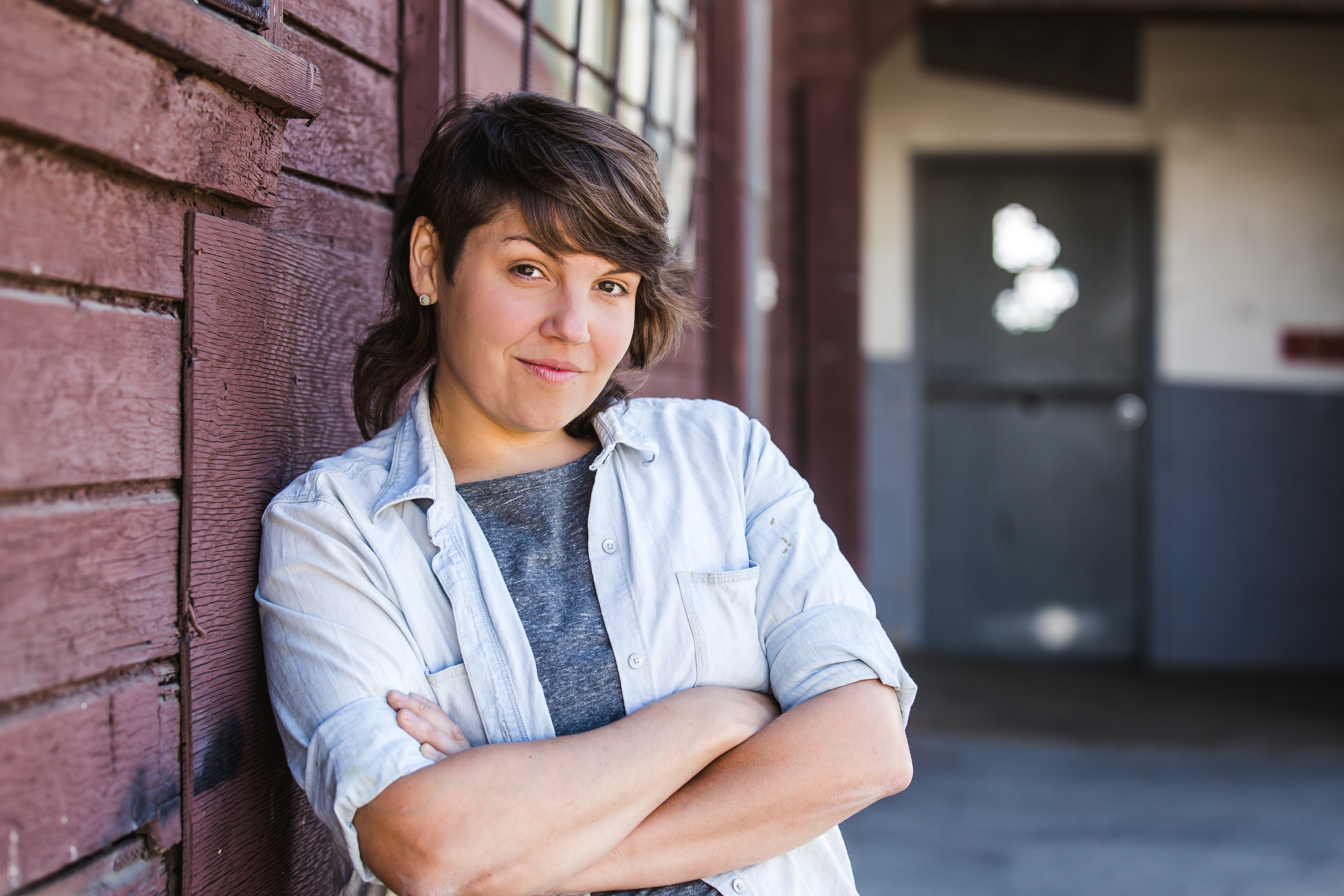
- Duncan in 2015
- Born: Vancouver Island, British Columbia, Canada
- Occupation: Furniture maker
- Years active: 2012–present

Kate Duncan is a Canadian furniture maker and designer. Duncan employs women in her studio, runs "gender-neutral" woodworking courses and created an inclusivity-focused tradeshow for the design industry.

== History ==
Duncan was born on Vancouver Island, British Columbia, Canada, and raised in city of Port Alberni.

She was introduced to woodworking in grade seven, where shop class was a required part of the school curriculum. She continued taking woodworking classes through to the end of secondary school and competed in weekend woodworking competitions.

After high school, Duncan earned a Bachelor of Education from the University of British Columbia. She taught high school wood shop in Burnaby, British Columbia for over 10 years. She was one of only four women teaching shop in the province.

In 2009, Duncan completed a master’s thesis on gender equitable programming at Royal Roads University in British Columbia.

After a motorcycle accident left her unable to teach, Duncan found a woodshop in East Vancouver where she could work while rehabilitating. She started out making furniture for herself but gradually started to find clients. She decided to take up woodworking full time in 2012.

== Designs ==
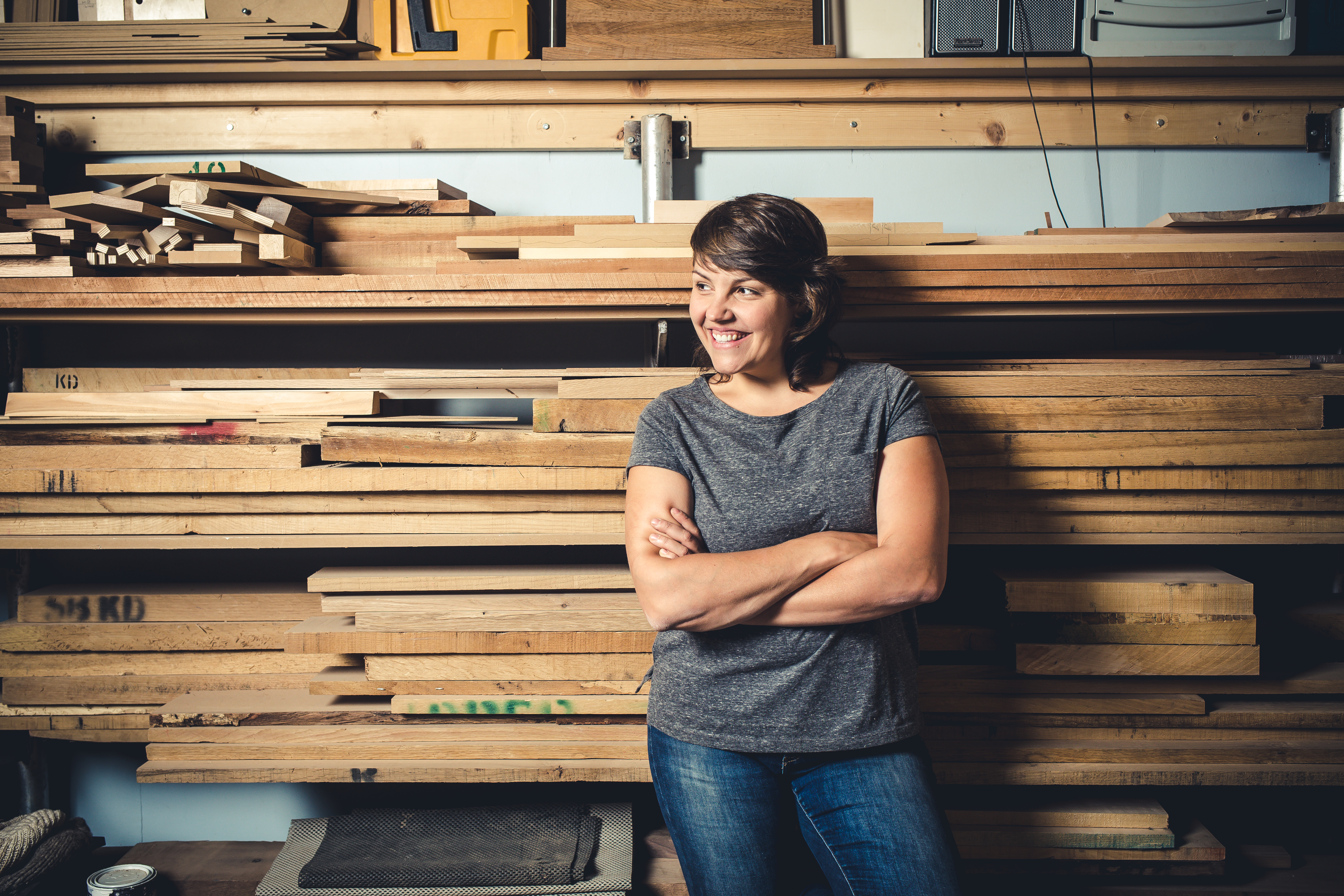
Canadian furniture maker Kate Duncan

Duncan describes her works as “heirloom-quality furniture” that is made to last. She focuses on simple manufacturing and joinery techniques to produce furniture rooted in traditional woodwork, rather than being design-forward. She cites the Brutalist architecture movement as an influence on her furniture designs.

Duncan, who is gender-queer, has named her design collections after her ex-girlfriends.

== Address trade show ==
After facing continuous discrimination at industry trade shows, Duncan launched her own, inclusive trade show. Named Address, the event was first held in 2014 in Vancouver.

In 2019, the show expanded its focus from the Pacific Northwest to include designers from across North America. That year the event featured 27 female-founded brands, out of 40 exhibitors, of which 25% identified as queer.

Duncan moved to Toronto in 2019. In 2020, Address, marked its first run in that city. Address partnered with existing trade show DesignTO. Duncan used sponsorship donations to reduce the exhibitor fees.

Address uses a layout different from the traditional trade show booth format. Rather than assign each exhibitor a dedicated piece of floorspace, the show’s curator assembles vignettes that resemble a real living space using pieces from multiple exhibitors, prompting the description “Part-gallery, part-pop-up shop, and part-showroom".

Address is billed by the organizers as “anything but a trade show” and is described publicly as the “anti-trade show show”.

== Appearances & awards ==
Duncan was one of 8 Canadian designers to show at the curated Manhattan design event “Next Level” in May, 2019.

She was named “Furniture Designer of the Year 2017” by Western Living magazine. Duncan was the first woman to win the award. Subsequently, she was named as one of the judges for the same award in 2020. That same year, Duncan was one of six finalists for Gray Magazine’s GRAY Awards 2020 in the category Product Design: Lighting/Furniture.

Duncan is a member of the Female Design Council, an organization dedicated to providing a professional community for woman in the design industry irrespective of color, race or sexual identity.
