= Schools Plus =

New Zealand education policy

The Schools Plus logo

Schools Plus is a controversial New Zealand education policy, proposed by Prime Minister Helen Clark. The policy originally aimed to implement a higher school-leaving age (currently 16) however was eventually changed, with its new scope being to require those under 18 to be involved in some form of educational process.

== Introduction ==
The policy was first announced by Clark during the annual statement (state of the nation speech) to Parliament, on February 12, 2008, along with statistics that showed 30% of New Zealand teenagers were leaving school before the age of 17 and 40% of those failed to achieve the second level of the National Certificate of Educational Achievement.

The policy was intensely debated throughout New Zealand and eventually reannounced by Clark on September 19, 2008. The reannouncement included numerous changes to the policy to rebut criticism that it was simply an attempt to raise the school-leaving age. The full effect of Schools Plus will come into effect in 2014.

== Proposal ==
The original proposal was to raise the minimum age required to leave school in New Zealand from 16 to 18 and to remove the current procedure making it possible for an exemption to be obtained by anyone aged 15. Clark asserted the implementation of the policy came in light of concerns that a large number of New Zealand teenagers were leaving school with few or no qualifications.

After intense debate the proposal was changed in a reannouncement seven months later. The altered policy no longer alters the minimum leaving age but still abolishes the possibility of acquiring an exemption, and makes it mandatory for school-leavers younger than 18 to still be involved in further education outside of school, such as an apprenticeship or through a polytechnic.

The first effects of the policy are set to be introduced in 2011 when an education and training age will be established for school-leavers aged 17. The full policy will come into effect in 2014 when the education and training age will be lifted to 18.

The policy is expected to cost NZ$150m to cover staffing, capital and operational costs.

== Reaction ==
Schools Plus has drawn significant negative reaction. The Post-Primary Teachers' Association labelled it a "draconian and simplistic response to a complex problem", citing that forcing students to remain at school does not "radically [transform them to be] enthusiastic and attentive", however, while opposed to the removal of exemptions, the PPTA welcomes the program on the basis that other programs have been proven to work. National Party leader John Key said the policy was an admission from Labour that their policies were failing and that many young people had jobs that they were learning from. Key claims the policy is a "rehash" of plans that were announced six years ago in that they are very similar to the Mayors' Taskforce for Jobs agreement the Government formed in 2002 and that Schools Plus was "the same announcement". Peter Gall, president of the Secondary Principals Association, criticised the policy as not taking into account "special cases" where leaving school was the only option and that the current crackdown on school leavers results in students remaining on the roll but not turning up to class. Schools Plus was also boycotted by fifteen schools who refused to acknowledge the proposal until funding shortages were addressed.

== See also ==
- Education in New Zealand
