= Robert Brauneis =

American lawyer

Robert F. Brauneis
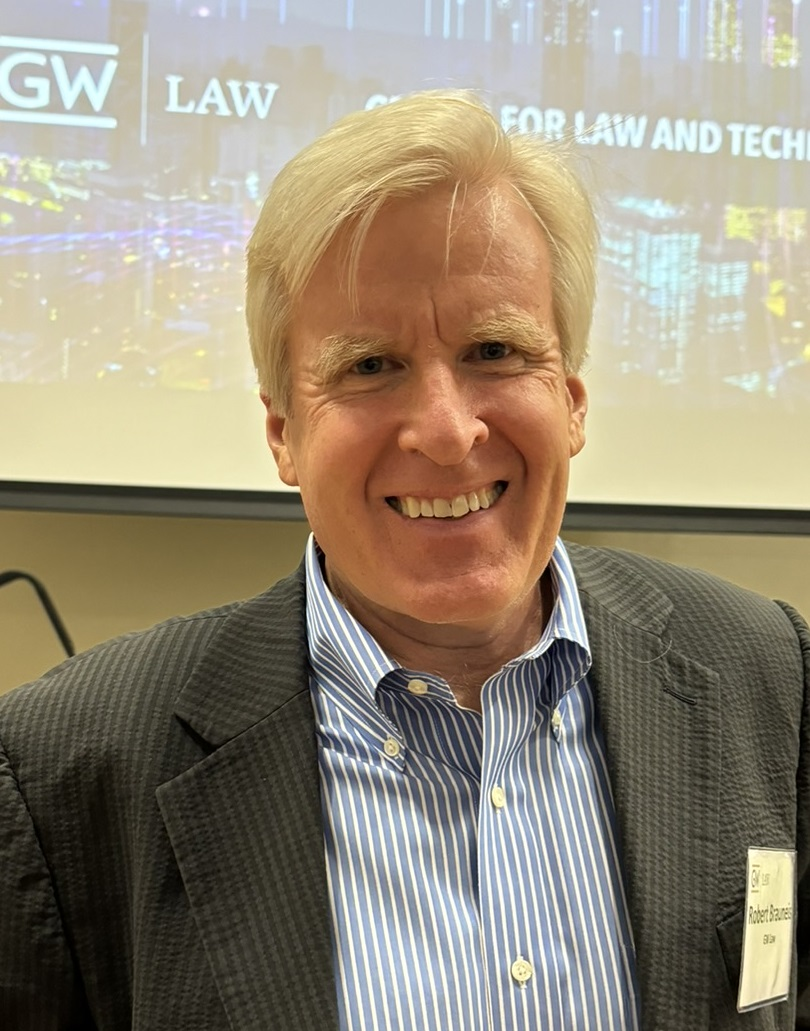
- Professor Brauneis in 2024
- Citizenship: American
- Education: University of California, Santa Cruz (BA); Harvard Law School (JD)
- Occupation: Law professor
- Known for: Intellectual property law scholar
- Website: Personal Website

Robert F. Brauneis is a professor of intellectual property law at the George Washington University Law School.

== Biography ==
Brauneis received a B.A. from the University of California, Santa Cruz in 1982, and a J.D., magna cum laude from Harvard Law School in 1989. He then served as a law clerk to Judge Stephen Breyer of the United States Court of Appeals for the First Circuit, and then to Justice David Souter of the Supreme Court of the United States from 1992 to 1993. Between his clerkships, he worked as an Assistant Corporation Counsel for the city of Chicago. In August 1994, he joined the faculty of George Washington University Law School.

He is most noted for his article, Copyright and the World's Most Popular Song, which provided the evidence used to determine that the longstanding claim to copyright ownership of the song, Happy Birthday to You, was invalid. Brauneis has also published many other articles, and contributed to the authorship of several books.

== See also ==
- List of law clerks for the third seat of the Supreme Court of the United States

== Selected publications ==
- Brauneis, Robert; Schechter, Roger (2012). Copyright: A Contemporary Approach. Interactive Casebook Series. St. Paul, MN: West Academic Publishing ISBN 1683285557
- Brauneis, Robert (1996). "The Foundation of our 'Regulatory Takings' Jurisprudence: The Myth and Meaning of Justice Holmes' Opinion in Pennsylvania Coal v. Mahon." Yale Law Journal 106: 613–702. (JSTOR access).
