= Extraordinary Rendition (album) =

eXtraOrdinary rendition

Studio album by Rupa & the April Fishes
- Released: April 15, 2008 US

Rupa & the April Fishes chronology
eXtraOrdinary rendition (2008)	este mundo (2009)

Extraordinary Rendition (stylized eXtraOrdinary rendition) is the debut album of Rupa & the April Fishes, released April 15, 2008 on the Cumbancha label. It includes influences such as Argentinian tango, Gypsy swing, and Indian ragas. The title is a reference to the practise of torture by proxy, or extraordinary rendition.

== Track list ==
No.	Title	Length
1.	"San Francisco"	0:51
2.	"Maintenant"	4:07
3.	"Poder"	3:37
4.	"C'est pas d'l'amour"	4:50
5.	"Une Americaine a Paris"	3:59
6.	"La Pecheuse"	5:38
7.	"Mal de Mer"	4:38
8.	"Les Abeilles"	5:39
9.	"Plus Que Moi"	4:00
10.	"Not So Easy"	1:46
11.	"La Peinture"	4:31
12.	"Yaad"	4:57
13.	"Wishful Thinking"	4:00
