= Australian Women in Music Awards =

Annual awards event celebrating women in the Australian music industry

Australian Women in Music
- Current: 2024 Australian Women in Music Awards
- Awarded for: Recognising and celebrating women in the Australian Music Industry who have made significant and lasting contributions in their chosen field
- Location: The Tivoli, Brisbane
- Country: Australia
- First award: 2018; 8 years ago
- Final award: Current
- Website: womeninmusicawards.com.au

Australian Women in Music Awards (AWMA) is a not for profit charity which delivers an annual award ceremony and conference program to recognise the vast contributions of women across all areas of the Australian Music industry. The two-day program includes forums, a showcase event, networking and an annual awards ceremony.

The AWMA was founded in March 2018 by industry veteran Vicki Gordon and come after the research report 'Skipping a Beat' published in 2017 found gender inequality to be rife in the Australian music industry. Artist Katie Noonan said at the launch, "These awards are a powerful signal to our industry, our artists and our audience that female musicians can, should and will take centre stage". The inaugural event was staged in Brisbane on 9–10 October 2018. Helen Reddy was the inaugural inductee into the AWMA Honour Roll.

In its second year, the AWMAs became a beacon for recognising the achievements and contributions of women across all areas of the Australian music industry. In 2020 and 2021 AWMA was cancelled due to the COVID-19 pandemic in Australia. It returned on 17–18 May 2022 in Brisbane, Queensland.

== Background ==
The aim of Australian Women in Music is to advance gender equality in the Australian music industry by recognising the value, achievements and contributions of women across all areas of industry. Women represent only one-fifth of songwriters and composers registered with APRA, despite making up 45 percent of qualified musicians. Of the 100 most played songs on commercial radio in 2016, only 31 were by a female act or act with a female lead. Since the first Australian Independent Records Association Awards in 2006 to 2018, only 22 of the total 103 awards presented have been won by acts with a female lead, or equal numbers of women and men.

== Categories ==
Categories as listed below

- Honour Roll: The AWMA honour roll acknowledges outstanding women in the Australian music industry who have made significant and lasting contributions in their chosen field. It provides a platform for recognition and appreciation of political activists & exceptional creative pioneers in their sector.
- Lifetime Achievement Award: Presented to a female artist or musician who has made an outstanding artistic contribution to the field of recording and/or live performance during her lifetime.
- Inaugural Tina Arena Special Impact Award : (2021) Recognises an unsung champion in the Australian Music Industry.
- Humanitarian Award: Recognises an individual (female, male or gender nonconformist) who has made a significant and lasting contribution to the field of music education, and/or assisting female artists working in remote and/or regional communities.
- Diversity in Music Award: Recognises individual artists or female-driven musical collaborations for their contribution to advancing a culturally diverse and inclusive music industry.
- Studio Production Award: Recognises a female sound engineer or producer who has made contributions of outstanding significance in the studio recording environment.
- Live Production Award: Recognises a female working in a live production or touring environment making significant impact in her field: Includes Tour Management, Live Sound, Lighting, Backstage and Road crew.
- Music Leadership Award: Recognises a female CEO, managing director, Label Manager, A&R Director, Artist Manager or Publisher making significant impact in music industry leadership.
- Songwriter Award: Recognises an outstanding female songwriter or composer.
- Emerging Artist Award: Acknowledges an outstanding emerging female artist.
- Music Photographer Award: Recognises a female music photographer currently working in the field and to acknowledge her body of work.
- Film-maker Award: Recognises a female music videographer, clip-maker, film-maker, or music animator currently working in the field and to acknowledge her body of work.
- Artistic Excellence Award: Recognises exceptional creative achievement from a female artist/musician across any genre.
- Excellence in Classical Music Award: (2019+) Recognises a mid-to-late career female classical music artist who has demonstrated musical excellence throughout her career.
- Music Journalist Award: (2019+) Recognises a female music journalist, blogger or editor who has made a creative contribution and courageous impact in truth telling and innovative reporting in the Australian Music Industry.
- Excellence in Image Making Award: (2019–2021) Recognises a female hair and/or makeup artist and/or stylist working to change the face of music visually to break down gender, race and social cultural stereo types.
- Creative Leadership Award: A curatorial award recognising excellence in creative programming from women working in broadcast media (radio, TV, online, streaming services), a music festival or live performance/venue to champion female artists.
- Heavy Music Award: (2023+) Recognises a female who has made contributions of outstanding significance as an artist, musician, music practitioner, agent, artist or label manager, supporter and/or advocator of Heavy Music.
- Executive Leader Game Changer Award: (2023+)
- Inspiration Award : (2023+)
- Opera Australia Impact Award: (2024+)

== AWMA Music Awards by year ==
To see the full article for a particular year, please click on the year link.

Year	Honour Roll	Lifetime Achievement Award	Ref.
2018	Helen Reddy	Patricia Amphlett, Renée Geyer & Margret RoadKnight	
2019	Judith Durham	Joy McKean	
2020	Not held (due to COVID restrictions)		
2021	Olivia Newton-John	Deborah Cheetham	
2022	Not held (due to COVID restrictions) The 2021 was held in May 2022		
2023	Renée Geyer and Judy Stone	Jeannie Lewis, Clare Moore and Kate Ceberano	
2024	Dame Joan Sutherland and Patricia Amphlett	Kasey Chambers	
2025	Ruby Hunter	Dr. Shellie Morris (AO)	
