= Girls in our Town =

"Girls in Our Town"

Song by Margret Roadknight

from the album Margret Roadknight
- B-side: "Captain Jack"
- Written: 1974
- Released: January 1976
- Genre: Country
- Length: 2:42
- Label: The Ritz
- Songwriter: Bob Hudson
- Producers: Simon Heath; Wahanui "Wyn" Wynyard

Margret Roadknight singles chronology
"Girls in Our Town" (1976)	"Love Tastes Like Strawberries" (1976)

"Girls in Our Town" is a song about the life of young women in Newcastle, Australia, written by Bob Hudson. He released it on his live album, The Newcastle Song (see the title track, "The Newcastle Song") in 1974.

In 1976, country music artist, Margret Roadknight covered the song and it reached the top 40 on the Kent Music Report singles chart. It also appeared on her third album, Margret Roadknight, in October of that year.

According to Rachel Lucas of Australian Broadcasting Corporation's Open the track, "painted a cruel trajectory for teenage girls living in country towns; teenage school drop outs, lonely cashiers and factory workers, with nothing to keep them entertained but vanity and promiscuity." It was subsequently performed by Judy Small.

From October 1993 RoadKnight was a member of an a cappella quartet, Girls in Your Town, with Jarnie Birmingham, Mara Kiek, and Moya Simpson.
