= 2017 Queen's Birthday Honours (Australia) =

Australian award

The 2017 Queen's Birthday Honours for Australia were announced on 12 June 2017 by the Governor-General, Sir Peter Cosgrove.

The Birthday Honours were appointments by some of the 16 Commonwealth realms of Queen Elizabeth II to various orders and honours to reward and highlight good works by citizens of those countries. The Birthday Honours are awarded as part of the Queen's Official Birthday celebrations during the month of June.

== Order of Australia ==
General division ribbon

Military division ribbon

=== Companion (AC) ===
==== General Division ====
Recipient	Citation	Notes
Catherine Elise Blanchett	For eminent service to the performing arts as an international stage and screen actor, through seminal contributions as director of artistic organisations, as a role model for women and young performers, and as a supporter of humanitarian and environmental causes.	
Professor Peter Malcolm Colman FRS	For eminent service to medical research, particularly in the fields of structural biology and medicinal chemistry, as a leader in the commercial translation of scientific discoveries, to professional organisations, and as a mentor of young scientists.	
Michael Jenkins Crouch, AO	For eminent service to the community through philanthropic contributions to youth, cultural, medical research and health care organisations, to business in the areas of manufacturing and international trade, and as a supporter of innovation and higher education.	
The Right Honourable the Lord Mayor of Melbourne Robert Keith Bennett Doyle	For eminent service to the people of Melbourne through roles in local government, to the Parliament of Victoria, particularly in the areas of health and public administration, and to the community as a supporter of youth, social welfare and medical research foundations.	
Professor Kenneth Charles Freeman, FRS	For eminent service to astronomy through pioneering contributions in the field of galactic archaeology, as a leading astrophysicist and researcher, to tertiary science education, to professional academies, and as a mentor of young scientists.	
Peter Gago	For eminent service to the Australian wine industry as an internationally acclaimed winemaker, to the global promotion of excellence in oenology, marketing and research, as a mentor, and to the community of South Australia.	
Aaron Jonna Gandel, AO	For eminent service to the community as a benefactor and supporter of a range of visual arts and cultural institutions, to youth education, medical and biotechnology innovation programs, to business and to the advancement of philanthropic giving.	
Professor Ross Gregory Garnaut, AO	For eminent service to the community as a leading international economist in the area of energy efficiency and climate change policy, to the development of Australia-Asia Pacific relations, and through contributions to social and political discourse.	
Alan Joseph Joyce	For eminent service to the aviation transport industry, to the development of the national and international tourism sectors, to gender equity, inclusion and diversity, and to the community, particularly as a supporter of Indigenous education.	
Professor Svend Peter Klinken	For eminent service to the people of Western Australia, to the promotion of international investment, scientific research and export opportunities, and through roles with maritime, mining, emergency management and not-for profit organisations.	
Julian McMahon	For eminent service to the law and the legal profession, through pro bono representation of defendants in capital punishment cases overseas, as an advocate for the abolition of the death penalty, and to human rights and social justice reform.	
Jacques Nasser, AO	For eminent service to business and international commerce in the mining and manufacturing sectors through leadership and executive roles, to the development of sustainable policy frameworks for industry and government, and to the community as a philanthropist and benefactor.	
Professor David Ian O'Connor	For eminent service to tertiary education, particularly to the strategic development of national and international university initiatives, and to the community through engagement in social policy, child welfare and juvenile justice research.	
Professor Philip Noel Pettit	For eminent service to philosophy through contributions to moral and political theory, as a distinguished academic, and as a leader of public debate on social, economic and environmental issues.	
Professor John Shine, AO	For eminent service to medical research, particularly in the area of biopharmaceuticals and molecular biology, to higher education as an academic, to professional medical organisations, and as a supporter of the advancement of innovation in science.	

=== Officer (AO) ===
==== General Division ====
Recipient	Citation	Notes
Richard James Alcock	For distinguished service to the community, particularly through health management roles, and to the law, corporate governance, and higher education organisations.	
Professor Ian Phillip Anderson	For distinguished service to the Indigenous community, particularly in the areas of health equality, aged care and education, as an academic, researcher and medical practitioner, to policy reform, and as a role model.	
Paris Aristotle, AM	For distinguished service to the refugee and asylum seeker sector through executive and advisory roles with a range of state and national organisations, and as an advocate for improved social welfare programs.	
Emeritus Professor Graeme Austin Bird	For distinguished service to aeronautical engineering, particularly in the field of molecular gas dynamics, as a researcher and academic, to professional scientific organisations, and as a mentor of young scientists.	
Philip Bullock	For distinguished service to vocational education and training through leadership and advisory roles, as a leader in the information technology sector, and as a supporter of equal opportunity.	
Dr Patricia Ellen Cameron	For distinguished service to the Indigenous community of Tasmania through the promotion of educational participation and achievement, and to the preservation of culture, custodianship and traditional knowledge.	
Pamela Joy Clark	For distinguished service to the dental profession, particularly through a range of roles with national and international associations, as a supporter of research and technical dental standards, and to manufacturing.	
Christopher Edgar Cuffe	For distinguished service to the community as an advocate for philanthropy, as a supporter of improved financial efficiencies in charitable organisations, and to the funds management industry.	
Bruce Kelvin Cutler	For distinguished service to the performing and visual arts, including the provision of pro-bono legal and financial administration advice, to people who are blind or have low vision, and to the community.	
Professor Peter John Dawkins	For distinguished service to tertiary education as an administrator and academic, particularly in the field of applied economic and social research, to professional organisations, and to public administration.	
Collette Mary Ann Dinnigan	For distinguished service to the clothing manufacturing industry as an internationally renowned fashion designer and entrepreneur, as a supporter and promoter of Australian wool, and to women as a role model.	
Christopher Barcroft Eccles	For distinguished service to public administration, to innovative policy development and sound governance, and to the delivery of reform in the areas of training, education and disability.	
Emeritus Professor Geoffrey Bruce Fincher	For distinguished service to science, and to education, in the area of plant genomics, as an academic, researcher and administrator, through scientific advisory roles, and to international professional societies.	
Andrew Vernon Fletcher	For distinguished service to business, particularly to the development of defence related industries in South Australia, through senior roles with maritime facility and major infrastructure projects, and to engineering.	
Professor Gordian Ward Fulde	For distinguished service to emergency medicine as a clinician and administrator, to medical education, and to the community as an advocate for a range of public health issues.	
Professor Andrew John Gleadow	For distinguished service to the earth sciences, and to education, as an academic and researcher in the field of thermochronology and landscape evolution, and to professional geological and scientific societies.	
The Right Reverend Kay Maree Goldsworthy	For distinguished service to religion through the Anglican Church of Australia, as a pioneer and role model for women, to church administration, and to pastoral care and equality.	
Antony John Green	For distinguished service to the broadcast media as an analyst and commentator for state and federal elections, and to the community as a key interpreter of Australian democracy.	
Dr Catherine Mary Green	For distinguished service to ophthalmology as a clinician, through executive roles with national and international professional groups, to research and education, and to eye health care programs in the Asia-Pacific.	
Denis Anthony Handlin, AM	For distinguished service to the Australian recording industry, through leadership and mentoring roles, as a supporter of young artists, and to charitable organisations as a director, patron and contributor.	
Professor Helen Edith Herrman	For distinguished service to medicine, and to mental health, as a leading clinician, researcher and scientist, to national and international professional organisations, and through programs to support youth and women.	
James Reginald Hogan	For distinguished service to the aviation transport industry, to the development of tourism and trade linkages between Australia and the Gulf States, and to international airline associations.	
Distinguished Professor Caroline Susan Homer	For distinguished service to medicine in the field of midwifery as a clinician, researcher, author and educator, through the development of worldwide education standards, and to professional organisations.	
Professor Ian Douglas Hume	For distinguished service to science in the field of biology, particularly through contributions to nutritional ecology and the conservation of Australian native animals, and to tertiary education.	
Sheila Mary Kavanagh, AM	For distinguished service to nursing, particularly in the field of burns treatment, as a clinician, researcher and educator.	
Glenn Keys	For distinguished service to the community of the Australian Capital Territory through contributions to disability support programs, and to business and commerce as an advocate for corporate social responsibility.	
Professor Mohamed Hassan Khadra	For distinguished service to medicine in the field of urology as a surgeon, clinician and mentor, to rural and remote medical education, and to literature as an author and playwright.	
Professor Rajiv Khanna	For distinguished service to medicine in the field of immunology, through contributions to the development of cellular immunotherapies for the treatment of cancers, infectious complications and chronic disease.	
Professor Linda Joan Kristjanson	For distinguished service to tertiary education through leadership and governance roles, strategic and innovative university reforms, contributions to cancer research and palliative care, and to women.	
Professor Angel Francisco Lopez	For distinguished service to medical and scientific research in the areas of immunology and cell biology, and through innovative developments in cancer treatment, particularly acute myeloid leukaemia.	
Michael Francis Lynch, AM	For distinguished service to arts administration, to leadership of international cultural institutions and nationally recognised art organisations, and through contributions to Australian public life.	
Professor Stephen William MacMahon	For distinguished service to medical research at a national and international level, through advancements in the treatment of hypertension, stroke and diabetes, and to improving health outcomes for disadvantaged populations.	
Dr Phillip Lyle McFadden	For distinguished service to earth sciences as a geophysicist, through leadership of Australia's peak geoscience body, through collaboration and innovation in research, and to professional societies.	
David Millard Morgan	For distinguished service to business and the automotive manufacturing industry, to promoting Australian exports, and to tertiary education through fostering links between university and industry.	
Professor Robyn Ngaire Norton	For distinguished service to medical research through improving health outcomes for disadvantaged populations, to reducing the burden of road and traffic injury, and to professional organisations.	
Emeritus Professor Paul Edmond O'Brien	For distinguished service to medicine as a clinical surgeon and researcher, particularly of the stomach and its physiology, as a mentor to surgeons, and through contributions to public health in Australia and internationally.	
Stephen George Page	For distinguished service to the performing arts and contemporary dance, through enriching Australia's cultural environment, and by presenting Aboriginal and Torres Strait Islander arts to the world.	
Angus David Paradice	For distinguished service to the community through philanthropic contributions and charitable support, and to business and commerce in the field of investment management.	
The Honourable Ronald Anthony Phillips	For distinguished service to community health through leadership roles in the public and private sectors, through the development of health policy reform, and to the Parliament of New South Wales.	
Professor Jennie Louise Ponsford	For distinguished service to medical research in the field of neuropsychology, and through seminal advances in the diagnosis, treatment and rehabilitation of patients with traumatic brain injuries.	
Dr Brian Gordon Richards	For distinguished service to geotechnical engineering and soil science, particularly through research and development of measuring and understanding soil suction and its effect on soil strength.	
Dr Ian Thomas Ring	For distinguished service to medicine as an academic, researcher and advisor, and for improving Indigenous and economically disadvantaged population health outcomes, and to professional organisations.	
Professor Lynette Selwood	For distinguished service to tertiary education in the field of reproductive biology as an academic, researcher and author, to the conservation of marsupial animals, and to the promotion of science.	
Professor Margaret Mary Sheil	For distinguished service to science and higher education as an academic and administrator, through significant contributions to the national research landscape, and to performance standards.	
Peter Christopher Shelley	For distinguished service to business, particularly through contributions to the Tasmanian aquaculture industry, to Australia-Japan relations, to professional associations, and to the community.	
Professor Roger Simnett	For distinguished service to the accountancy profession, to business education, to the development of national and international auditing and assurance standards, to accounting organisations, and to research.	
Professor Donald James St John, AM	For distinguished service to medicine, and to medical research, as a gastroenterologist, to innovative public health cancer screening programs, and as a mentor of young clinicians.	
The Honourable Robert Edward Tickner	For distinguished service to the community through leadership roles with the Australian Red Cross, and to the Parliament of Australia.	
Gabrielle Mary Trainor	For distinguished service to the community through consultancy roles, particularly in the field of transport and infrastructure planning and design, and as a contributor to social welfare, sporting, and cultural institutions.	
Malcolm Charles Wauchope	For distinguished service to public administration in Western Australia through leadership and advisory roles, to improved governance, public sector management and policy reform, and to the community.	
Michael John Wilkins	For distinguished service to the insurance industry, particularly to improved corporate social responsibility standards, to the building of natural disaster resilience and safer communities, and to workplace diversity.	
Brian Arthur Wilson	For distinguished service to the financial and banking sectors through public policy advisory roles in the areas of foreign investment, taxation and superannuation reform, and to higher education administration.	
Professor Jeremy Somers Wilson	For distinguished service to medicine as a pancreatologist, to medical administration and clinical governance, to education as an academic, researcher and mentor, and to professional associations.	
Dr Katherine Lesley Woodthorpe	For distinguished service to business through venture capital, management and commercialisation initiatives for research and technology based enterprises, and to industry organisations.	
Dr Alexander Zelinsky	For distinguished service to defence science and technology, to systems engineering, and to education as an academic and researcher.	

==== Military Division ====
Branch	Recipient	Citation	Notes
Army	Lieutenant General Angus Campbell, DSC, AM	For distinguished service as Head Military Strategic Commitments, Deputy Chief of Army, and Chief of Army.	
Air force	Air Vice Marshal Andrew Eric Dowse, AM	For distinguished service to the Australian Defence Force in capability development, strategy and planning, and information and communication technology operations senior appointments.	

=== Member (AM) ===
==== General Division ====
Recipient	Citation	Notes
Dr Christopher John Acott	For significant service to medicine as an anaesthetist, to difficult airway management, to diver safety, and to the community.	
Michael David Agostini	For significant service to the oil and gas industry as an engineer, and through a range of advisory roles.	
The late Stephen Cameron Ashton	For significant service to architecture through management and design roles, to professional organisations, and to motor sport.	
Dr Amanda Anita Bell	For significant service to education, particularly to young women as a leader and academic, and to the visual arts.	
Peter Michael Bensom OAM	For significant service to international relations, particularly the promotion of Australia in the United Kingdom.	
Professor Judith Carolyn Bessant	For significant service to education as a social scientist, advocate and academic specialising in youth studies research.	
Professor John Burville Biggs	For significant service to tertiary education, particularly in the fields of curriculum development and assessment.	
Jean (Judy) Birmingham	For significant service to higher education, particularly to historical archaeology, as an academic, and to professional associations.	
The late Peter Michael Bonsall-Boone	For significant service to the community as an LGBTQI advocate and supporter, and through a range of volunteer roles.	
Brian James Bourke	For significant service to the law and the legal profession, to Australian rules football, and to the community.	
Gwynneth May Bridge	For significant service to the community through leadership in the early childhood care and education sector.	
Michael Ray Brown AFSM	For significant service to the community of Tasmania through fire and emergency management.	
Peter John Burness	For significant service to the preservation of military history as a researcher, curator, author and guide.	
Peter Mark Butler OAM, RFD	For significant service to the community through a range of charitable organisations, and to the provision and promotion of pro bono legal services.	
Associate Professor Ann Mary Bye	For significant service to medicine in the field of paediatric neurology as a clinician, academic, and mentor.	
Elizabeth Jessie Carr	For significant service to the community through voluntary contributions to the health, aged care, education and social services sectors.	
Ann Kirsten Carr-Boyd	For significant service to the performing arts and classical music as a composer, pianist, teacher and musicologist.	
Ian Clifton Carroll OAM	For significant service to conservation, particularly through management of the built, cultural and natural heritage sector.	
Ian Menzies Carson	For significant service to the community through contributions and leadership in the food rescue sector, and to business.	
Simone Lea Carson	For significant service to the community through contributions and leadership in the food rescue sector.	
Professor Richard Ian Christopherson	For significant service to medicine in the area of molecular bioscience through contributions to cancer research.	
Professor Peter Grahame Colman	For significant service to medicine in the field of endocrinology, particularly diabetes research, patient education and clinical management.	
Michael Henry Coppell	For significant service to the entertainment industry as a producer and promoter of theatre, festivals and national concert tours.	
The Honourable James Glennister Cox	For significant service to the Parliament of Tasmania, to local government and the people of Launceston, and to road safety.	
Julia Ann Cox	For significant service to the arts through executive roles supporting cultural institutions, and to special education and child welfare.	
Dr Leanne Winifred Craze	For significant service to the community as an advocate for the rights of people living with mental illness.	
Professor John Nicholas Crofts	For significant service to medicine in the field of epidemiology, particularly through contributions to the control of HIV and other infectious diseases.	
Donald Charles Crombie	For significant service to the Australian film and television industry through contributions as a director and writer, and to professional organisations.	
Denis John Cunningham	For significant service to education, particularly through executive roles with national and international language teaching organisations.	
Dr David Charles Daintree	For significant service to education, particularly to tertiary colleges, and as a scholar.	
Paul Noel Dainty	For significant service to the entertainment industry as a producer and promoter of national concert tours, theatre and events.	
Lynette Ann Danise	For significant service to the community of South Australia through a range of voluntary roles with service organisations, and to youth.	
Peter De Waal	For significant service to the community as an LGBTQI advocate and author, and through a range of volunteer roles.	
Professor Stephen Arthur Deane	For significant service to medicine in the field of trauma surgery as a clinician and academic, and to professional organisations.	
Michael Joseph Dowling	For significant service to the community of Geelong through leadership with a range of social welfare, business and education organisations.	
Michael Ebeid	For significant service to the broadcast media and multicultural affairs as an executive, innovator and business leader.	
Annette Gale Edwards	For significant service to the performing arts as an international director and theatre producer, and as a teacher and mentor.	
The late Bernard Midget Farrelly	For significant service to surfing as a competitor and industry pioneer at the national and international level, and to surf lifesaving.	
Linda Rose Fazldeen	For significant service to women as an advocate for gender balance in business leadership, to public administration, and to the community.	
Mark Stephen Fennessy	For significant service to the broadcast media industry as an entrepreneur, innovator and production executive.	
Ronald Samuel Finkel	For significant service to Australia-Israel relations, to the Jewish community, and to business and commerce.	
Sydney Fischer OBE	For significant service to sailing as a yachtsman and international competitor, and as a mentor to young sailors.	
Nicolette Ella Fraillon	For significant service to the performing arts and musical performance as a conductor, to arts education, and to women.	
Richard Leslie Francis-Bruce	For significant service to film production as an editor, and to the Australian film industry as a role model and ambassador.	
Dr Harry Barnett Frydenberg	For significant service to medicine in the field of bariatric surgery as a clinician, author and mentor, and to professional organisations.	
Dr Stuart Brendon Gairns	For significant service to dentistry as a specialist periodontist, and to professional dental societies at state and national levels.	
Helen Gibson	For significant service to planning and environment law in Victoria, and as a role model for women in the profession.	
Alice Rosemary Giles	For significant service to the performing arts as a harpist, educator and mentor, and through contributions to Australia's musical landscape.	
Margaret Beth Gott	For significant service to the biological sciences as an ethnobotanist specialising in the study of the use of native plants by Indigenous people.	
Dr Dorothy Sara Graham	For significant service to community health through research and development of social policies to address disadvantage and inequity.	
Vincent John Graham	For significant service to public administration in New South Wales, particularly through reform of the rail and electricity sectors.	
Dr Anne Mary Gray	For significant service to the visual arts as a curator, scholar and historian, to Australian artists, and to the promotion of cultural heritage.	
George Gross	For significant service to the Australian fashion industry as a designer, and to the community through support for a range of charities.	
Katalin Gross	For significant service to the Australian fashion industry, and to the community through support for a range of charitable organisations.	
Anna Eva Guillan	For significant service to the Australian tourism industry, and to the community through support for social welfare and health organisations.	
Fiona Helen Guthrie	For significant service to the community through social welfare and financial counselling roles.	
James Christopher Hall	For significant service to the community through support for sustainable social welfare outcomes, and to the not-for-profit sector.	
Dr Leslie Selwyn Hall	For significant service to veterinary science as a specialist in the area of bat biology, and as an academic, researcher and mentor.	
Philip Michael Hamblin	For significant service to the law, particularly through representation of, and legal assistance to, the Indigenous community of Armidale.	
The Honourable John Planta Hannaford	For significant service to the Parliament of New South Wales through a range of senior ministerial roles, to law reform, and to the community.	
Colonel Raymond Ross Harding (retired)	For significant service to the veteran community through preserving and documenting the history of modern Army Aviation in Australia.	
Jody Heald	For significant service to music education in Tasmania as a teacher, mentor and administrator, and to professional associations.	
Paul Ronald Heather	For significant service to the building and construction industry through leadership of professional bodies, and to industry based education.	
Gregory Ross Hocking	For significant service to the performing arts as a conductor, director and theatre manager, and to the development of the Melbourne comedy industry.	
John Reginald Hodgkinson RFD	For significant service to engineering, particularly the road construction and concrete industries through new technology development.	
Paul Cuthbert Hoy	For significant service to the Catholic Church, and to the Coptic Orthodox Church, through a range of administrative, financial and legal advisory roles.	
Dr Gordon Langford Hughes	For significant service to the law, to professional organisations, and to international affairs and legal practice in the Asia Pacific region.	
Bridgit Mary Hussey	For significant service to conservation and land management practices in Western Australia through a range of government and volunteer roles.	
Adele Hyland	For significant service to the performing arts as a choreographer and dance educator, and to developing dance as a sport.	
Elston Colin Hynd	For significant service to youth through executive training roles with Scouts, and to the banking and finance sector.	
Wendy Elizabeth Jenkins	For significant service to literature as an author, editor and publisher, and to mentoring and developing Australia's literary community.	
Dr Anne Elizabeth Johnson	For significant service to community health, particularly child injury prevention, through executive roles, and as a researcher and academic.	
Dr Helen Margaret Jones	For significant service to veterinary science and animal welfare as a clinician and educator, and as a mentor to women in the profession.	
Professor Stephen David Joseph	For significant service to science through research and developments in biochar engineering and renewable energy, and to the community.	
The Honourable Joseph Victor Kay	For significant service to the judiciary through reforms to child protection policy and family law and practice, and to the legal profession.	
Mary Ann Kelly	For significant service to education, to policy development and advocacy in schools, and to student and staff equity in the university sector.	
Charles Roger Kirk	For significant service to the performing arts as a costume and set designer for theatre, dance, opera and film productions.	
Dr Anthony William Lake	For significant service to legal dentistry, particularly to forensic odontology, to disaster victim identification, and to professional dental standards.	
David Allen Larkin	For significant service to international business and commerce through leadership and innovation in the Australian beef export industry.	
Leslie Charles Lauder	For significant service to the community through contributions to the history and preservation of Australia's built and natural heritage.	
Dr Francis Joseph Leahy	For significant service to surveying and mapping through research and innovation, and to education as a lecturer and mentor.	
Dr John Charles Leyden	For significant service to community health as an advocate for patient support networks and research into neuroendocrine cancer.	
John Ernest Lines	For significant service to the shipping and transport logistics industries through leadership and advisory roles, and to professional organisations.	
Dr Ivan Thomas Lorentz	For significant service to medicine as a neurologist, and to pioneering treatment methods for neurological disorders.	
Robert Allan Love	For significant service to the performing arts, particularly in Western Sydney, as an administrator, and as a supporter of independent artists.	
Alison Mary McClelland	For significant service to the community through contributions to the development, monitoring and analysis of social policy, and to education.	
The late Geoffrey Lloyd McDonald	For significant service to the community, particularly through improvements to workplace health and safety standards, and to engineering.	
Professor Peter Simon Macdonald	For significant service to medicine in the field of heart transplantation and cardiovascular research, and to medical education.	
Professor Ann Margaret McGrath OAM	For significant service to the social sciences as an academic and researcher in the field of Indigenous history, and to tertiary education.	
John Dudley McPhee	For significant service to the road transport industry in the area of supply chain and logistics, and to the community.	
Deborah Jane Mailman	For significant service to the performing arts as an actor, as a role model for Indigenous performers, and to the community.	
John Marshall	For significant service to the energy supply sector, to corporate governance, and to charitable and medical research institutions.	
Ray Ian Marshman	For significant service to education, particularly to dentistry, and to the community through youth mental health and emergency service groups.	
Associate Professor Alaric Mervyn Maude	For significant service to education in the field of geography as an academic, researcher, author, and mentor.	
The Honourable Justice Michelle May	For significant service to the law, particularly to the Family Court of Australia, to judicial administration, and to professional associations.	
Dr Sandra Meihubers	For significant service to dentistry, to remote Indigenous communities, and through international humanitarian oral health care programs.	
Daryl Melham	For significant service to the Parliament of Australia, and to the community of south west Sydney through a range of organisations.	
Giuseppe Pino Migliorino	For significant service to the Italian community, to multicultural and refugee settlement assistance groups, and through advisory roles.	
Peter Spence Milne	For significant service to primary industry, particularly to the livestock sector, to animal health and biosecurity programs, and to the community.	
Dr Timothy Joseph Mooney	For significant service to medicine through a range of multiple practice roles, to doctors in rural and remote areas, and to the community.	
Dr John Geoffrey Moran	For significant service to medicine in northern New South Wales, to medical administration and education, and to the community.	
Diana Mary Morgan	For significant service to the arts, particularly to the museum and galleries sector, as a supporter and benefactor, and to the community.	
Professor Graeme John Morgan	For significant service to medicine as a clinical geneticist and paediatrician, to medical education, and to professional organisations.	
Leonie Jane Morgan	For significant service to women, particularly in the area of equitable political representation, and through a range of community organisations.	
Dr Kevin Francis Murfitt	For significant service to people who are blind or have low vision, through senior roles, to the promotion of inclusion, and to education.	
Alistair Murray	For significant service to sailing, as a supporter of young sports people, and to the marine manufacturing and export industry.	
Ashak Nanji Nathwani	For significant service to the Ismaili community in Australia, to tertiary education in the area of sustainable design, and to engineering.	
Dr Geoffrey George Newcombe	For significant service to secondary education, particularly to the independent schools sector, and to educational organisations.	
Patricia Anne Newton	For significant service to the broadcast media as an entertainer and presenter, and as a supporter of charitable and medical research foundations.	
Associate Professor Rosemary Louise Nixon	For significant service to community health in the field of occupational dermatology, as an academic and researcher, and to professional standards.	
Michael James O'Connell APM	For significant service to public administration in South Australia, particularly in the area of criminal justice, and to victims' rights.	
Noella Jean O'Donnell	For significant service to women in rural and regional areas of Queensland, to medical research fundraising, and to the community.	
Dene Maxwell Olding	For significant service to the performing arts, notably to symphony orchestras, as a concertmaster, musician and artistic director.	
Michael Gregory Piggott	For significant service to the community as an archivist with national and international educational and cultural institutions, and as an author.	
Lawrence John Pointing	For significant service to public administration in the area of crime investigation and prevention, and to the community of Queensland.	
Lynne Dolores Price	For significant service to youth, particularly to girls and young women, at the state and national level through Girl Guides.	
Nicholas John Radford	For significant service to medicine as a nephrologist, to the management of medical complications during pregnancy, and to professional standards.	
Emeritus Professor Neil Robert Rees	For significant service to the law and to education as an academic, to legal reform, and to mental health and professional organisations.	
Dr Catherine Mary Regan	For significant service to medicine in the field of general practice training and education, and to the community of the Hunter.	
Mark Stephen Relf	For significant service to people with a disability, to accessibility standards and inclusion, and through advisory roles.	
Gail Patrice Richey	For significant service to the fishing and aquaculture industry, particularly in Tasmania, and to fisheries management and industry associations.	
Professor Merle Calvin Ricklefs	For significant service to tertiary education, particularly to Asia and Pacific research and scholarship, and to the development of programs for Indigenous students.	
Dr James Rifi	For significant service to the Lebanese community of New South Wales, as an advocate for multi-faith relations, and to medicine.	
His Honour Judge Orazio Rinaudo	For significant service to the law and to the judiciary in Queensland, to legal ethics and professional standards, and to the community.	
David William Robinson	For significant service to medicine as a plastic and reconstructive surgeon, and to the primary industry sector, particularly to agriculture.	
John Stuart Rochlin	For significant service to Australia-Spain relations through a range of consular, commerce and industry, and tertiary education support roles.	
Deborah Ann Rolfe	For significant service to the community of the Australian Capital Territory through medical, social welfare and charitable foundations.	
Richard John Rolfe OAM	For significant service to the community of the Australian Capital Territory through philanthropic support of medical, cultural and social welfare organisations.	
John Henry Romeril	For significant service to the performing arts as a playwright and screenwriter, and to theatre companies and education.	
Marilyn Patricia Rowe OBE	For significant service to the performing arts, particularly to ballet, as an artistic director, administrator, internationally acclaimed performer and competition jurist.	
Judith Anne Ryan	For significant service to the visual arts, particularly to the museums and galleries sector, as a curator of Indigenous exhibitions, and as an author.	
Professor Robert Bryce Saint	For significant service to tertiary education as an academic, administrator and researcher, and to the biomedical and molecular sciences.	
Richard Barney Scheinberg	For significant service to the community through philanthropic support for educational, youth, medical, cultural relations and social welfare groups.	
Kosmas Stan Sclavos	For significant service to the pharmacy profession through a range of retail, advisory and executive roles, to education, and to community health.	
Ian Alexander Scobie	For significant service to the performing arts through the production, management and promotion of festivals, theatre and performance events.	
Emeritus Professor Dorothy Ann Scott OAM	For significant service to the community, particularly to child protection and wellbeing, as an advocate for children's rights reform, and to education.	
Dr Peta Luise Seaton	For significant service to the Parliament of New South Wales, to the community of the Southern Highlands, and to higher education.	
Christopher David Selwood	For significant service to science and technology, particularly through the development and promotion of solar vehicles, and to the community.	
Dr Hugh Gailbraith Seward	For significant service to Australian rules football as a physician, particularly to the prevention and management of injuries.	
Hugh Douglas Sheardown	For significant service to community health, particularly to people with coeliac disorders, through executive roles at the state and national level.	
Professor John Blair Sheehan	For significant service to the real estate and property planning sectors, to professional institutes, and to educational and legal bodies.	
John Neville Shipp	For significant service to library and information management in the tertiary education sector, and to emerging technologies.	
David John Shipway	For significant service to Australian rules football in South Australia, and as a supporter of youth, charitable and medical research organisations.	
Graham Harry Slade	For significant service to the community as a supporter of aged care, medical and multicultural associations, and to the pharmacy profession.	
Terence Slater	For significant service to public administration through pharmaceutical and food regulatory agencies, and to community health.	
Fiona Jean Smith	For significant service to the community as an advocate for human rights and social justice issues.	
Judith Ellen Smith	For significant service to community health through pharmacy regulation and health practitioner roles, to nursing, and to aged persons.	
Dr Dianne Maree Snowden	For significant service to the community as an historian and genealogical researcher, to higher education, and to heritage groups.	
Dr Raymond David Snyder	For significant service to medicine, particularly as an oncologist, to cancer research, and to professional and service delivery organisations.	
Marcus Anderson Stafford	For significant service to people with a disability, and to community health, through support for those affected by multiple sclerosis.	
Antony Joseph Sukkar	For significant service to the community through support for sporting and social welfare organisations, and to the construction sector.	
Josephine Louise Sukkar	For significant service to the community through a range of roles with sporting, social welfare and cultural organisations, and to the construction sector.	
Emeritus Professor Ronald Taft	For significant service to education and research in the field of psychology, and to the community.	
David John Thomas OAM	For significant service to the community through philanthropic support for medical research, environmental conservation and cultural institutions.	
Paul David Thomas	For significant service to local government, to the community of the Northern Yorke Peninsula, to tourism, and to cultural festivals.	
Ann Elizabeth Tonks	For significant service to the performing arts through senior management and advisory roles, to education, and as an author.	
Claude George Ullin	For significant service to the community through a range of organisations, to the visual arts, to multiculturalism, and to local government.	
Frank Samuel Van Straten OAM	For significant service to performing arts heritage and conservation as a theatre historian, as an author, and to the broadcast media.	
Marisa Vecchio	For significant service to the community, particularly to health administration, standards and accreditation, to education, and to business.	
Sheree Anna Vertigan	For significant service to secondary education, to professional leadership and educational administration associations, and to youth.	
Emeritus Professor Robert Alan Vincent	For significant service to science, and to education, particularly in the field of solarterrestrial physics, as an academic and researcher.	
Karyn Joan Walsh	For significant service to the community through social welfare initiatives, to support for people who are homeless, to children, and to mental health.	
The Honourable Anne Marie Warner	For significant service to the people and Parliament of Queensland, and as an advocate for women in the criminal justice system.	
Garry Stephen Watson	For significant service to the tourism industry in the Australian Capital Territory, and to educational visitation initiatives.	
Harry Milton Watt	For significant service to the Australian fashion industry as a designer, and to the community through support for a range of charities.	
Professor David Anthony Wattchow	For significant service to medicine as a gastrointestinal surgeon, to medical education, to professional societies, and as a benefactor.	
Adjunct Professor Jennifer Marian Webb	For significant service to education, particularly to archaeology, as an academic, researcher and author, and to the community.	
Andrew Milton Wells	For significant service to academic librarianship, to the development of innovative information delivery technologies, and to professional councils.	
Professor Denise Leanne Wood	For significant service to education as an academic, researcher and practitioner in the field of participation, inclusion and access.	
Antonio Zeccola	For significant service to the visual arts, particularly to the Australian motion picture industry, through a range of roles, and to multiculturalism.	

==== Military Division ====
Branch	Recipient	Citation	Notes
Navy	Rear Admiral Peter Geoffrey Laver, RAN	For exceptional service to the Royal Australian Navy in significant Command and Staff roles.
Navy	Commodore David Christian Scott, OAM, RAN	For exceptional service to the field of Australian Defence Force Intelligence and as the Director General Joint Information Environment Warfare.
Army	Colonel Debra Lee Bradford	For exceptional service to Defence Education and Training as Colonel Education, Training and Development at Headquarters Forces Command Army, and Director of Learning Capability Development for the Australian Defence College.
Army	Lieutenant Colonel Michael Douglas Edstein	For exceptional service to the Australian Defence Force in vector borne disease research.
Army	Brigadier Craig Dennis Furini, CSC	For exceptional service as the Director of Coalition Joint Strategy, Plans and Assessments on Headquarters Combined Joint Task Force - Operation INHERENT RESOLVE on Operation OKRA from February 2015 to March 2016.
Army	Brigadier Michael David Prictor	For exceptional service as Director General Training at Headquarters Forces Command and Commander of the 16th Aviation Brigade.
Army	Lieutenant Colonel Ian John Robinson, CSM	For exceptional service to deployed Australian Defence Force personnel through Forces Entertainment from 2008 to 2016.
Army	Major General Kathryn Toohey, CSC	For exceptional service to the Australian Defence Force in the fields of capability development and education.
Air Force	Air Commodore John Burnett	For exceptional service as a legal officer and as the Deputy Judge Advocate General - Air Force.
Air Force	Air Commodore Russell Campbell	For exceptional service in establishing the Air Combat Officer Specialisation; in organisational change management; and in the development of an integrated, networked air warfare capability.
Air Force	Air Commodore Michael Robert Kitcher, OAM	For exceptional service to the Australian Defence Force in air combat sustainment, aviation safety development, and major capability planning and introduction.
Air Force	Air Commodore Kelsey Marshall	For exceptional service in operational planning and logistics, and organisational management.
Air Force	Air Vice Marshal Stephen John Osborne, CSC	For exceptional service in maritime surveillance and response support, Joint Battlefield Airspace Controller development, airborne early warning and control acquisition, and strategic planning.

=== Medal (OAM) ===
==== General Division ====
Recipient	Citation	Notes
Ruth Ogden Abdullah	For service to the Indigenous community of Western Australia.	
Rodney James Allen	For service to the community of Hahndorf.	
John Richard Anderson	For service to Rugby League in regional New South Wales.	
The Reverend Kenneth John Anderson	For service to the Uniting Church in Australia.	
Eng Joo Ang	For service to the Chinese community in Australia.	
Kevin George Archer	For service to the community through a range of volunteer roles.	
Mary Archer	For service to the community through a range of volunteer roles.	
Captain Eric John Atkinson	For service to the maritime transport industry.	
Gwyneth Austen	For service to the community of Red Rock.	
Rodney Charles Austin	For service to surf lifesaving.	
Harlie Bruce Axford	For service to choral and jazz music.	
Bernard William Balmer	For service to boxing.	
Ella Mary Bambery	For service to the community of Williamstown and western suburbs.	
Claire Emily Barnes	For service to hockey.	
John Gregory Barnes	For service to the community of the Northern Rivers.	
Phyllis Ann Barnes	For service to the community of Bunbury.	
Walter Clifford Barrett	For service to local government, and to the community of the Murray shire.	
The late Graeme Thomas Barrow	For service to bushwalking and local history in the Australian Capital Territory.	
Donald John Barry	For service to youth through Scouts, and to the community.	
Brian Robert Baxter	For service to natural resource management in Tasmania.	
David Christopher Bell	For service to aviation.	
Francis John Bell RFD, ED	For service to veterans and their families.	
David Wesley Benn	For service to the community through church, social welfare, and educational foundations.	
Rosemary Margaret Birney	For service to conservation and the environment.	
Helga Biro	For service to the community of Cairns through social welfare groups.	
Aldis Janis Birzulis	For service to the Latvian community of New South Wales.	
Ian Alexander Black	For service to community history.	
Lieutenant Colonel David George Blackwell RFD (retired)	For service to veterans, and to the community.	
Michael Francis Blair	For service to the community of Baulkham Hills, and to local government.	
The late Walter Michael Blumenfeld RFD	For service to the community of the Australian Capital Territory.	
Sarah Jean Boddington	For service to international relations through the provision of humanitarian assistance in Nepal.	
Robert Charles Bolch	For service to the community of the Mornington Peninsula.	
Paul David Bonsak	For service to children as a foster carer, and to business.	
John Lindsay Brabant	For service to people who are homeless, and to dentistry.	
Anne Elizabeth Brackley	For service to youth through Guiding, and to the community.	
Yvonne Braid	For service to local government, and to the community of Wagga Wagga.	
Susan Gae Brigg	For service to hockey.	
The late Wayne John Broadbent	For service to football in New South Wales.	
Warwick Boris Brodsky	For service to the community, particularly to the Australian Red Cross Blood Service.	
Paul Broughton	For service to rugby league, and to the community.	
Lieutenant Colonel John Edward Bullen (retired)	For service to military history preservation and education.	
Patricia Susette Cain	For service to aged care, and to the community.	
John Graham Cameron	For service to the community through a range of roles.	
Jennifer Jean Camilleri	For service to community history.	
Stanley John Canny	For service to the community through a range of roles.	
Merilyn Gaynor Carey	For service to the Baptist Church, and to the community.	
Gary George Carr	For service to community health, and to sport.	
Joyce Isabel Carr	For service to the community of Nundle.	
William John Carr	For service to rural health, and to the community of Rokewood.	
Eric Brettell Causer	For service to veterans and their families, and to the community.	
The late Derek Kenneth Challis	For service to the community through a range of roles.	
Phillipa Challis	For service to the community of Geelong.	
Elizabeth Anne Chapman	For service to education, and to the community.	
Wendy Georgene Charleston	For service to heritage preservation, and to the community of Wilmot.	
Peter Joseph Cipollone	For service to people who are deaf or hard of hearing, and to education.	
Francis Edward Clark	For service to the community of Ballarat, and to people who are deaf or hard of hearing.	
Kay Cleak	For service to veterans and their families, and to youth through Scouts.	
Peter James Coad	For service to the performing arts, particularly to country music.	
Doctor David Miller Coles	For service to medicine, and to rowing.	
Patricia Collett	For service to the community through a range of roles.	
Jack Condous	For service to the visual arts, and to education.	
The late Denis Patrick Connelly	For service to veterans and their families.	
Doctdor Allan Edward Cook	For service to medicine as an orthopaedic surgeon.	
Percy Norman Cooper ED	For service to the superannuation sector, and to the community.	
Roger John Cooper	For service to maritime history, and to the community.	
John Cornaggia	For service to people who are blind or have low vision, and to sport.	
Howard John Cornish	For service to music, particularly through brass bands.	
Doctor Terence James Coyne	For service to medicine as a neurosurgeon.	
Doctor Robert James Craig	For service to medicine as a cardiologist.	
Keri Craig-Lee	For service to the clothing manufacturing sector, to business, and to the community.	
Desree-Ilona Crawford	For service to country music as an entertainer.	
Frank Hollis Creagh	For service to the community of the Dandaragan shire, and to local government.	
Adrian Anthony Cropley	For service to the communication profession, to youth, and to the community.	
Allen James Cullen	For service to special education, and to trampolining.	
Thomas Bernard Cullen	For service to local government, and to the community of Coonamble.	
Lyndell Ellen Davidge	For service to the community of Hahndorf.	
Doctor Roger Madgwick Davidson	For service to medicine, to education, and to the community.	
Frances Anne Day	For service to the community of Lockhart.	
Maxwell Lloyd Day	For service to the community of Lockhart.	
Associate Professor Alan Mithra De Costa	For service to medicine, and to the community of Far North Queensland.	
Margaret Anne De Wit	For service to local government, and to the community of Brisbane.	
Paul Anthony Dellit	For service to the performing arts in Queensland.	
Malcolm Dempsey	For service to lawn bowls, and to the community.	
Robert Denford Dewell	For service to the community of Hahndorf.	
Associate Professor Ronald John Dick	For service to medicine as a cardiologist.	
John James Zhao-Zhang Ding	For service to Chinese-Australian relations through academic organisations.	
Kenneth Malcolm Dixon	For service to cricket in Queensland.	
Bonney Annette Djuric	For service to heritage preservation, and to the community of Parramatta.	
Ferdinando Dominelli	For service to the community through a range of roles.	
Melda Kay Donnelly	For service to the financial management and superannuation sectors.	
Claire Donovan	For service to people who are blind or have low vision, and to youth.	
Doctor Francis Anthony Donovan	For service to veterans and their families.	
Doctor Bernard Michael Doube	For service to science as a researcher.	
Wayne Neil Douglas	For service to dance as a teacher and adjudicator.	
Allan Roy Dowdell	For service to the community of Mount Gambier.	
Jennifer Rae Dowell	For service to local government, and to the community of Lismore.	
John Carey Downton	For service to the visual arts as a maritime artist, and to the community.	
William Thomas Dowson	For service to sport, and to the community of the Illawarra.	
Valerie Marie Doyle	For service to the community through the Australian Red Cross.	
John Francis D'Souza	For service to the community through social welfare organisations.	
The Reverend Francis Cornelius Duffy	For service to veterans and their families, and to the community.	
Barbara Mary Duncan	For service to the performing arts as a choreographer.	
Alan Francis Dyer	For service to community history.	
Beverley Anne Dykes	For service to the community through a range of roles.	
Collins Norton Dyson	For service to the transport industry, and to the community of Bundoora.	
The late Gordon John Ellings	For service to rowing, to youth, and to the community.	
Robert James Erskine	For service to the community of Hunters Hill.	
Wayne Christopher Etcell	For service to the community through a range of roles.	
Shelley Faubel	For service to the community of East Melbourne.	
Commander Rodrick Richard Fayle (Retd)	For service to the macadamia nut growing industry.	
Karl Arthur Fender	For service to architecture, and to professional institutions.	
Stephen Joseph Fernie	For service to youth through Scouts.	
Norman Rex Fettell	For service to sailing.	
Rabbi Ronnie Figdor	For service to the community through a range of organisations.	
Barry Roy Finch	For service to the community through social welfare groups.	
Robert Lindsay Findley	For service to the community.	
Doctor Dianne Fay Firth	For service to landscape architecture, and to education.	
Doctor Jeremy Allan Fisher	For service to literature, to education, and to professional organisations.	
Geoffrey Gerard Fitzpatrick	For service to industrial and interior design.	
Reece Samuel Flaherty	For service to conservation and the environment.	
Derek John Fletcher	For service to the community of Kalamunda.	
Anthony Bryan Forsyth	For service to the promotion and preservation of mineralogical history.	
John William Fowler	For service to the community through a range of organisations.	
Harold Douglas French	For service to cricket, and to the community of South Australia.	
George Nelson Frew	For service to the preservation of maritime history.	
Susannah Christine Fullerton	For service to literature as an author, lecturer and historian.	
John Bryant Gannon	For service to cricket.	
Brian Raymond Gent	For service to the community of the Gold Coast.	
Robert Joseph Gescheit	For service to the community of Eastern Sydney.	
Daniel Brenton Giles	For service to people with a disability, and to the community.	
Doctor Scott Stanley Giltrap	For service to medicine, particularly in regional areas.	
Barry James Gobbe	For service to the community.	
Jayne Helen Goodes	For service to the community.	
Eleanor Joyce Goodman	For service to the community of the Australian Capital Territory.	
Trevor Michael Gorey	For service to the accountancy profession in Western Australia.	
Ruth Kathryn Gorton	For service to community health.	
Daniel John Goulburn	For service to the community through health, education and sporting groups.	
Shirley May Gow	For service to children as a foster carer, and to the community.	
Jocelyn Grant	For service to the community of Queenscliff.	
Wendy Ann Green	For service to people with a disability through sports.	
Leon Stuart Gregory	For service to the Olympic movement, and to athletics.	
Kelvin Craig Griffith	For service to people with asthma, and to the community.	
Milad Kaldas Guirguis	For service to the Coptic Orthodox church in Melbourne.	
Maurice Francis Hagarty	For service to conservation and the environment.	
Philippa Marie Hale	For service to dental nursing.	
Harlan Evans Hall	For service to the community of Berrima.	
Lynette Patricia Hall	For service to the community of Berrima.	
Peter Hall	For service to swimming.	
Helen Mary Halliday	For service to the community of Port Phillip.	
John William Hammer	For service to cricket, and to seniors' sport in Victoria.	
William Andrew Handke	For service to community health, and to conservation.	
Gerard Francis Hanily	For service to charitable organisations, and to business.	
John Thomas Hanlon	For service to the community of Benalla.	
Valerie Dawn Hannah	For service to the performing arts through dance.	
Maria Hansen	For service to the community of Dayboro.	
Doctor Geoffrey Alexander Harding	For service to musculoskeletal medicine.	
Joan Helene Harris	For service to community history.	
Berenice Frances Harrison	For service to music.	
Patricia Joyce Harry	For service to the visual arts.	
Peter Graham Harvey	For service to architecture.	
Kathleen Margaret Hassell	For service to conservation and the environment.	
William Harold Heath	For service to the community of Narrabri.	
Colin Terence Heazlewood	For service to higher education.	
Noel Rex Hender BEM	For service to the community of South Australia.	
Dorothy Lynette Hennessy	For service to vocational education and training, and to the community of the Illawarra.	
Doctor Richard Francis Herlihy	For service to medical professional support organisations.	
Cheryl Patricia Hersey	For service to veterans and their families.	
The late Roger James Hickman	For service to sailing.	
James Donald Higgs	For service to cricket.	
Sandra Rae Hills	For service to aged care in Victoria.	
Stephen John Hirt AFSM	For service to the community of Melton.	
Colin Richard Hodges	For service to the horse racing industry as a radio broadcaster.	
Helen Mary Hogan	For service to lawn bowls in Far North Queensland.	
Geoffrey Lloyd Holmes	For service to the community of Toowoomba.	
David Michael Horstman	For service to youth, to community health, and to animal welfare.	
Leslie Charles Hotchin	For service to emergency response organisations, and to the community.	
Gitie House	For service to the community of Toowoomba.	
Ian Cromie Howden	For service to the community through a range of roles.	
May Hu	For service to the broadcast media, to women, and to the multicultural community of Victoria.	
Super Hubert	For service to children through charitable organisations.	
Patricia McGaw Hughes	For service to the community, and to youth.	
Doctor Garrett Francis Hunter	For service to medicine, and to the community of the Northern Territory.	
Myrle Cynthia Hunter	For service to the community as an author and historian.	
Professor Helen Eva Huntly	For service to tertiary education in Central Queensland.	
Ian Perry Hyman	For service to people with a disability.	
Susan Ivany	For service to women, and to aged care in Victoria.	
Matthew Henry Jacobs	For service to marine rescue organisations.	
Peter Donald James	For service to surf lifesaving.	
Craig Jon Jarvis	For service to wheelchair sports.	
Guruswamy Jayaraman	For service to the Indian community of Western Sydney.	
Bruce Raymond Jeffrey	For service to veterans and their families.	
Peter Jennings	For service to the community of Gippsland.	
Carole Linde Jobling	For service to the community of Muswellbrook.	
Associate Professor Thomas William Jobling	For service to medicine, particularly to ovarian cancer research.	
Harry Fredrick Jones	For service to people with a disability, and to the pharmacy profession.	
Howard Campbell Jones	For service to the print media, to historical societies, and as an author.	
William Edward Josephs	For service to veterans and their families.	
Associate Professor Martin Roderick Jude	For service to medicine as a neurologist.	
Tanya Aysen Kaplan	For service to Turkey-Australia relations, and to the veteran community.	
Rabbi Mendel Kastel	For service to the community through social welfare bodies, and to youth.	
Ian Parker Kelly	For service to the community of Western Australia.	
Michael Robert Kemp AFSM	For service to the community through emergency response organisations.	
Graeme Ernest Kent	For service to the international community through humanitarian assistance programs.	
George Robert Kinealy	For service to the community through a range of roles.	
Marilyn Mavis Kinealy	For service to the community through a range of roles.	
Brian Thomas King	For service to community health.	
John Wallace King	For service to the community of Victoria.	
Roger Henry King RVM	For service to the Crown through vice-regal support roles.	
John Francis Kinsela	For service to wrestling, and to youth.	
Aylene Alice Kirkwood	For service to the community of Eaglehawk.	
Mary Carmel Knowles	For service to the community of the Northern Midlands, and to local government.	
Doctor John William Kramer	For service to medicine as a general practitioner in regional areas.	
Victoria Eva Kvisle	For service to cancer research organisations, and to the community.	
Desmond John Lacy	For service to multinational law enforcement relations and cooperation.	
Gerrard Michael Lambourne	For service to youth, and to the community of Bayside.	
Associate Professor David Langton	For service to thoracic and sleep medicine.	
Andrew John Lawson	For service to the community of Geelong.	
Gillian Layton	For service to children and families in the legal system.	
Bernard Jean Yves Le Boursicot	For service to the French community, particularly in New South Wales.	
Lawrence John Leeman	For service to the community through a range of organisations.	
Kelvin Derek Liddiard	For service to veterans and their families.	
Aivars Lidums	For service to chess, and to support for young players.	
Simon Richard Linke	For service to children, and to the community.	
Shaaron Jeanette Linwood	For service to local government, and to the community of the Atherton Tablelands.	
Susan Clubbe Litchfield	For service to the community of Cooma, and to cancer research and support organisations.	
Dianne Eunice Loddon	For service to education, and to the community.	
Christine Lesley Lofts	For service to children as a foster carer.	
Ian Gordan Lofts	For service to children as a foster carer.	
Edward Alfred Lovett	For service to the Indigenous community of southwest Victoria.	
Thomas Lowrey	For service to cricket.	
Merilyn Isabel Luck	For service to the community of Rockhampton.	
Barry Alyn Lumley	For service to seniors' education, and to the community.	
David Hung Lung	For service to the Chinese community of New South Wales.	
Heather Ann McCallum	For service to the community of Ballarat.	
Michael McColl Jones	For service to the performing arts as a comedy writer for television.	
Barry John McConville	For service to the community, and to education.	
Allan George McCormac	For service to the community, particularly to road safety.	
Paul Desmond McCrohan	For service to the community through a range of roles.	
Sandra Edith McKay	For service to the performing arts, particularly to ballet.	
Neil Campbell Mackenzie	For service to the community through scale model steam train displays.	
Doctor John William McLaren	For service to the community of Cowra, and to medicine.	
Margaret Joy McLean	For service to masters sport, and to the community.	
Stuart John McLean	For service to the community, and to local government.	
Grant Cameron McMah	For service to surf lifesaving.	
Madeleine Elizabeth McManus	For service to engineering, and to education.	
Marjorie Ann McNamara	For service to athletics, and to the community.	
Desmond Noel McNulty	For service to the forest and wood products industry, and to the community of Benalla.	
Carla Carol Magarey	For service to the community of Loxton.	
Peter Ashley Magarey	For service to the community of Loxton, and to plant pathology.	
Patricia Mary Malowney	For service to people with a disability through advocacy roles.	
Graeme John Manning	For service to veterans and their families.	
Marcelle Mansour	For service to the visual and literary arts, and to the Arabic speaking community.	
Desmond George Manwaring	For service to local government, and to the community of the Lachlan shire.	
Gerard Rodney Mapstone	For service to veterans and their families.	
Anthony John Marchant	For service to cycling.	
Attila Marffy	For service to the Hungarian community, and to publishing.	
Emeritus Professor John Ernest Marley	For service to medical education.	
Brian Kenneth Marshall	For service to primary industry education.	
Dennis Graham Martin	For service to the community of Coffs Harbour.	
Peter James Meehan	For service to the community through a range of roles.	
William Gerard Melbourne	For service to local government, and to the community of the Mitchell shire.	
Leonie Carol Mills	For service to youth.	
Dawn Doris Moggach	For service to squash as an administrator.	
Shirly Elizabeth Mooney	For service to veterans and their families.	
Doctor Gregory Murray Moore	For service to the environment, particularly to arboriculture.	
Jeffrey William Moorfoot	For service to the visual arts, particularly to photography.	
Raymond Douglas Morgan	For service to the community through health and education programs.	
Sherry Josephine Morris	For service to community history.	
Francesco Giuseppe Moschella	For service to the community through a range of organisations.	
Louise Anne Mugridge	For service to oncology nursing, and to the community of Young.	
Liliana Ewa Mularczyk	For service to secondary education in New South Wales.	
Kenneth Lachlan Mulcahy	For service to the community through a range of roles.	
Morgan Joseph Murphy	For service to sport, particularly to swimming.	
Gordon Robert Murray	For service to veterans and their families.	
Richard James Nicol	For service to botanical gardens as a volunteer.	
Margaret Nunn	For service to the community through a range of organisations.	
Richard John Oates	For service to public administration through contributions to developing Defence capability.	
Elizabeth Kay Oke	For service to the community through support and counselling for fertility and human reproduction.	
Michael Peter O'Meara	For service to veterans and their families, and to the community of Kilsyth.	
Louis James Onley	For service to the community through a range of roles.	
Karin Susan Orpen	For service to local government, and to the community of Ferntree Gully.	
Edward Pakchung	For service to the community through the Chinese Christian Church.	
Brigetta Paneth	For service to the community of Melbourne through a range of roles.	
Peter Alan Parkinson	For service to the retail footwear industry, and to animal welfare.	
Doctor Mahomed Said Patel	For service to medicine, particularly to field epidemiology.	
Peter Patisteas	For service to the community of Melbourne.	
Donalea Patman	For service to animal welfare.	
Janice Ethel Pavlinovich	For service to people with a disability.	
Peter Michael Pearce	For service to surf lifesaving.	
Doctor Roderick Douglas Peek	For service to medicine as a dermatologist.	
Roger James Perry	For service to veterans and their families.	
Lorraine Joy Pfitzner	For service to country music.	
Tina Maria Philip	For service to nursing, and to community health.	
Frank Stafford Phillips	For service to golf.	
Robert John Pink OAM (Military)	For service to veterans and their families.	
James Maxwell Porter	For service to the community of north-east Victoria through a range of organisations.	
Robert George Porter	For service to the music industry as a producer, writer and performer.	
Kelvin Dennis Portland	For service to the community of the eastern Pilbara.	
Dale Andrew Potter	For service to the community of Dookie.	
Neville Roy Potts	For service to architecture.	
Group Captain Kenneth Arthur Pratt (Retd)	For service to the aviation industry.	
Noelle Dawn Pratt	For service to veterans and their families, and to the community.	
Kelvyn John Prescott	For service to target shooting, and to the law.	
Daphne Hannah Proietto	For service to people with autism spectrum disorder and their families.	
Glenn Bernard Ramage	For service to the community through music.	
Andre Razums	For service to business and commerce.	
Susanne Maureen Rea	For service to the community.	
Gregory Redington	For service to the community of Townsville, and to football.	
Alfred Corfield Reichardt	For service to music, and to the community.	
Geoffrey Leigh Reilley	For service to cricket, and to Australian rules football.	
Lt Colonel Arthur Everett Reynolds RFD (Retd)	For service to veterans and their families.	
Darryl William Rice	For service to the community through voluntary roles.	
John Edward Richards	For service to the community, and to the manufacturing sector.	
Frank Rigby	For service to local government, to community health, and to the environment.	
Keith Murray Robertson	For service to youth.	
Ian Robilliard	For service to sport as an administrator, coach and competitor.	
The late Honourable Ian Louis Robinson	For service to the Parliaments of Australia and New South Wales.	
John Ernest Robinson	For service to veterans and their families.	
Ross Stuart Robinson	For service to horology.	
Doctor Robert William Rogers	For service to the community as a general practitioner, and through support for asylum seekers and refugees.	
Major Paul Anthony Rosenzweig (Retd)	For service to military history preservation.	
Stephen Peter Rowe	For service to the international community of Nepal.	
Peter Edward Rowse	For service to the community through a range of church organisations.	
Kevin Vincent Rucioch	For service to the community of Victor Harbor.	
Donald Stanley Ryan	For service to veterans and their families.	
Rosemary Joan Samios	For service to the Scottish community of New South Wales.	
Doctor Mehdi Sanati Pour	For service to medicine as a general practitioner in Mildura.	
David James Sanders	For service to cycling.	
Doctor Deen Justin Sanders	For service to public administration, and to professional standards.	
Laurence Julian Sanders	For service to the community of Boyanup.	
Daryl Maxwell Sanderson	For service to the community of the Gold Coast.	
Donald Kimberley Sarti	For service to conservation and the environment.	
Gareth Daniel Saunders	For service to sport through recreational running events.	
Barry William Savage	For service to the community of Gnowangerup.	
John Joseph Scholl	For service to international communities through humanitarian support.	
Sister Betty Schonfeldt	For service to social welfare in Adelaide.	
Bruce Leslie Scott	For service to local government, and to the community of Barcoo Shire.	
Isabel Grace Scott	For service to arts administration in Cootamundra.	
Maisie Louisa Scott	For service to the community of Bathurst.	
Sister Elvera Sesta	For service to secondary education in Queensland.	
John Thomas Seymour	For service to local government, and to the community of the Riverina.	
Adele Marie-Louise Sharpe	For service to youth through Scouts, and to the community.	
Assistant Commissioner David John Sharpe APM	For service to rugby league, and to the community of the Australian Capital Territory.	
Ian Stuart Sharpe	For service to youth through Scouts, and to the community.	
Jennifer Susan Sharwood	For service to secondary education.	
Doctor Brian John Shaw	For service to palliative care.	
Susan Shea	For service to the retiree community.	
The late Nevill Louis Sherburn	For service to the performing arts, particularly jazz music.	
John Damien Shortis	For service to the performing arts as an entertainer.	
Moya Simpson	For service to the performing arts as an entertainer.	
Dallas James Sinclair	For service to rugby league.	
Jeanie Fay Skyring	For service to the creative arts, and to the community of Canberra.	
Barry William Smith	For service to the community of Hobart.	
Desmond Charles Smith	For service to the community of Nhill through emergency services.	
John Thomas Smith	For service to sport in the Hunter.	
Leslie James Smith	For service to netball.	
Maisie Olga Smith	For service to the community of Babinda.	
Warren Earl Smith	For service to rugby league.	
Terry Snee	For service to industrial relations.	
David James Snook	For service to the community of Beachport.	
Karen Eve Spiller	For service to women, and to education.	
Reginald Phillip St Leon	For service to the multicultural community, and to education.	
Allen John Stanford	For service to business and commerce.	
Doctor David Robert Starte	For service to medicine as a paediatrician.	
Margaret Alison Steffens	For service to community health through outreach dental programs.	
Joseph Andrew Steiner	For service to the visual arts, and to community history.	
Donna Lisa Stepan	For service to animal welfare.	
Karen Lynne Stephenson	For service to swimming.	
Doctor Allan Richard Stewart	For service to dentistry, and to the community of the Mid North Coast.	
Bruce Anthony Stewart	For service to the community of Tamworth.	
Lorraine Margaret Stokes	For service to the community of Portarlington.	
Doctor Peter Darcy Sutherland	For service to medicine as a urologist.	
The late Rex Hamilton Tate	For service to the community through a range of organisations.	
Hugh Taylor	For service to the community of the Australian Capital Territory.	
Darryl Leslie Thomas	For service to the funeral industry, and to the community of Geelong.	
Associate Professor Gwynne Wilton Thomas	For service to medicine in the field of nephrology, and to the community.	
Glenn Robert Thompson	For service to family law, and to the community.	
Marcia Robin Thorburn	For service to the community of Wallendbeen.	
Richard Francis Tighe RFD	For service to sailing, to youth development, and to the community.	
Kieran John Tonge	For service to the community.	
John Cornelius Toohey	For service to veterans and their families, and to the community of Goondiwindi.	
Noreen Toohey	For service to the law, particularly as an advocate for the safety of children and families.	
Janet Mary Torney	For service to the community of Ballarat.	
Graham Roy Towle	For service to swimming.	
William Ian Townsend	For service to the international community, particularly to peacekeeping.	
Isabel Mary Trease	For service to the community through social welfare organisations.	
Neil Vincent Trease ASM	For service to the community through social welfare organisations.	
James Morison Treloar	For service to local government, and to the community of Tamworth.	
Joe Tripodi	For service to football, and to the multicultural community of South Australia.	
Desmond Charles Turner	For service to snooker.	
John Stanley Turner	For service to community health.	
Barry Vivian Vains	For service to veterans and their families.	
Antony John Varrall	For service to people with a disability.	
Peter Jan Veenstra	For service to rugby union, and to the community of Orange.	
Doctor Unnikrishnan Velayudhan Pilla	For service to the Malayalee community of Queensland.	
Erika Johanna Vickery	For service to local government, and to the community of Naracoorte.	
Peter Wachtel	For service to the community through ski patrolling.	
Elaine Dawn Wade	For service to the community of Penrith.	
Major James Wain (Retd)	For service to veterans and their families.	
Jeffery Gibson Wake RFD	For service to veterans and their families.	
Helen Jean Wall	For service to women, and to the community.	
The late Brian Thomas Walsh	For service to the community of Shellharbour.	
David Warren Ward ESM	For service to the community through a range of organisations.	
Elizabeth Stephens Watts	For service to veterans and their families.	
Carl Weaver	For service to youth through Scouts.	
William Bruce Weir	For service to the community of Mildura.	
Doctor Roger Thomas Welch	For service to ophthalmology.	
Eileen Rosana Wenn	For service to the floral arts through a range of roles.	
Kenneth Hugh Whan	For service to local government, and to the community of Benalla.	
Philip Charles Wheatley	For service to the community through youth support organisations.	
Mervyn Robert White	For service to the community of Mount Gambier.	
Nathaniel John White	For service to the wine industry.	
Leszek Wikarjusz	For service to the Polish community of Australia.	
Margaret Ann Wilksch	For service to conservation and the environment.	
Colleen Fay Wills	For service to local government, and to the community of Quirindi.	
Robert Harry Wilsdon	For service to people with disabilities, and to the community of Tasmania.	
Janice Ellen Wilson	For service to the community of Yass.	
Marcia Anne Wilson	For service to the community through a range of organisations.	
Marion Fay Wilson	For service to the community of Canowindra.	
Francis Wong	For service to the Chinese community of Sydney.	
Harry Wooding	For service to cricket.	
Janet Marion Woods	For service to the community of the Tweed Valley.	
Doctor Donald Stuart Worley	For service to sport for the disabled as a documentary film-maker.	
John Graham Worrell	For service to surf lifesaving.	
June Margrethe Wright	For service to youth through Scouts, and to the community.	
Michael Yiu-Wing Yau	For service to the multicultural community, and to engineering.	
Ann Myra Youl	For service to the community through a range of organisations.	
Peter Zadelis	For service to the community.	

==== Military Division ====
Branch	Recipient	Citation	Notes
Navy	Captain Michael John Harris RAN	For meritorious service in the field of maritime operations and Navy system command, coordination and management.	
Navy	Warrant Officer Joanne Maree Jordan	For meritorious service in personnel management and training in the Royal Australian Navy.	
Navy	Warrant Officer Arthur Gregory Lavender	For meritorious performance of duty in the field of Combat System Operator procedure and training development.	
Navy	Captain Malcolm Alexander Ralston RAN	For meritorious performance of duty in the field of Navy education and training.	
Army	Warrant Officer Class One Clifford Gregory Bell	For meritorious service as Company Sergeant Major in the 1st Military Police Battalion, the Trade Transfer and Retention Warrant Officer-South Queensland and as Regimental Sergeant Major of the 1st Military Police Battalion.	
Army	Warrant Officer Class One Kellie Eileen Brett	For meritorious performance of duty as the Regimental Sergeant Major of the 1st Recruit Training Battalion and the Regimental Sergeant Major (Ceremonial) for Army.	
Army	Warrant Officer Class One Rodney James Cornick	For meritorious service as the Regimental Sergeant Major Joint Task Force 633, Operations and Training Area Management - Tasmania and Queensland, and the Warrant Officer and Non-Commissioned Officer Academy.	
Army	Warrant Officer Class One David Alexander Galloway	For meritorious service to mentoring and training in Forces Command and the Combat Training Centre.	
Army	Warrant Officer Class One Nathan Holdforth	For meritorious service as the Senior Trade Medical Standards Warrant Officer at the Army School of Health and the Senior Medical Technician Army at the Directorate of Army Health, Army Headquarters.	
Army	Warrant Officer Class One Sean William McGinley	For meritorious performance of duty as the Regimental Sergeant Major of 5/6th Battalion, the Royal Victoria Regiment and the 1st Battalion, the Royal Australian Regiment and as contingent Regimental Sergeant Major for Operation ANODE.	
Army	Warrant Officer Class Two Michael Thomas Morrissey	For meritorious performance of duty as the Member Support Coordinator in the Army Personnel Coordination Detachment - Victoria, Army Personnel Support Centre.	
Army	Warrant Officer Class One R	For meritorious performance of duty in making long-term contributions to the operational and training capability of the 1st Commando Regiment.	
Air Force	Squadron Leader Anthony John Kiernan	For meritorious service in air lift capability development for the Royal Australian Air Force.	
Air Force	Sergeant Geoffrey Saul McLaughlin	For meritorious performance of duty in aircraft maintenance management and control.	

== Meritorious Service ==
=== Public Service Medal (PSM) ===
Public Service Medal ribbon

=== Australian Police Medal (APM) ===
Australian Police Medal ribbon

Branch	Recipient	Position	Notes
Federal	Commander Grant Stephen Edwards		
Federal	Detective Superintendent Kirsty Ann Schofield		
New South Wales	Chief Superintendent Donna Adney	Commander – Public Order and Riot Squad	
New South Wales	Detective Superintendent Peter Thurtell	Commander – Manning Great Lakes Local Area Command	
New South Wales	Superintendent Gregory Martin	Commander – Richmond Local Area Commander	
New South Wales	Detective Chief Inspector Kevin McNeil	Crime Manager – Far South Coast Local Area Command	
New South Wales	Chief Inspector Wayne Humphrey	Duty Officer – Port Stephens Local Area Command	
New South Wales	Inspector Anthony Reneker	Duty Officer – Griffith Local Area Command	
New South Wales	Inspector Donna Faul	Commander – Protocol and Awards Unit	
New South Wales	Sergeant Paul Dilley	Team Leader – Mid North Coast Highway Patrol	
Victoria	Detective Leading Senior Constable Trevor John Collins		
Victoria	Commander Brett John Curran		
Victoria	Superintendent Therese Kathy Fitzgerald		
Victoria	Detective Superintendent Michael John Hermans		
Victoria	Assistant commissioner Dean Anthony McWhirter		
Victoria	Detective Inspector Christopher Andrew Murray		
Victoria	Assistant commissioner Neil John Paterson		
Victoria	Detective Sergeant Solon Solomon		
Queensland	Sergeant Narelle Gaylene Collins		
Queensland	Inspector Sharee Tracey Cumming		
Queensland	Inspector Robert John McCall		
Queensland	Senior Sergeant Bradyn Michael Murphy		
Queensland	Inspector Virginia Anne Nelson		
Western Australia	Sergeant George Ross Adam		
Western Australia	Senior Constable Anthony John Cools		
Western Australia	Detective Inspector Mark Wayne Fyfe		
Western Australia	Senior Sergeant Jeffrey Bevan Taylor		
Western Australia	Superintendent Kathryn Laura Taylor		
South Australia	Senior Sergeant First Class Peter David Brown		
South Australia	Chief Superintendent Robert John Fauser		
South Australia	Detective Senior Sergeant Tania Narelle Sheldon		
Northern Territory	Assistant Commissioner Lance Anthony Godwin		

=== Australian Fire Service Medal (AFSM) ===
AFSM ribbon

Branch	Recipient	Notes
New South Wales	Michael William Brettschneider	
New South Wales	Robert Derek Avard	
New South Wales	Peter Micheal Brougham	
New South Wales	Kelly Therese Browne	
New South Wales	Craig Scott Burley	
New South Wales	Robert John Cox	
New South Wales	Rex Guskett Fuge	
New South Wales	Kernin Sidney Lambert	
New South Wales	Paul Edward Langley	
New South Wales	David George Loft	
New South Wales	Kenneth Andrew Murphy	
New South Wales	Alan George Tucker	
Victoria	Allan David Cracknell	
Victoria	Warren William Curry	
Victoria	Peter John Driscoll	
Victoria	Lance Phillip King	
Victoria	Steven Mark Warrington	
Victoria	David Youssef	
Queensland	Raymond Clinton Bott	
Queensland	Adam Philip Gwin	
Queensland	Ian Denis Sheperd	
Western Australia	Stephen Robert Treeby	
South Australia	Dennis Philip Turner	
South Australia	Jeffrey Shane Wiseman	
Australian Capital Territory	Brian John Talbot	
Northern Territory	Simon John Burt	
Northern Territory	Ryan Austin Clay	

=== Ambulance Service Medal (ASM) ===
ASM ribbon

Branch	Recipient	Notes
Queensland	Colin Wayne Allen	
Queensland	Catherine Leigh Dunstan	
Queensland	Peter Charles Fiechtner	
Queensland	Robert John Medlin	
South Australia	Maryanne Frances Elsby	
South Australia	David Robert Long	
South Australia	Gary John Wyld	
Australian Capital Territory	Michael Jon Abigail	

=== Emergency Services Medal (ESM) ===
ESM ribbon

Branch	Recipient	Notes
New South Wales	Stephen John Cliffe	
New South Wales	Keven Graham Marshall	
New South Wales	John James Murray	
New South Wales	Nichole Anne Richardson	
New South Wales	John Robert Steele	
Victoria	Glenn William O'Donnell	
Queensland	Janet May Scott	
Queensland	Elizabeth Frances Suhr	
South Australia	Christopher James Shaw	
Australian Capital Territory	Matthew David Butters	

== Distinguished and Conspicuous Service ==
=== Distinguished Service Cross (DSC) ===
DSC ribbon

Branch	Recipient	Citation	Notes
Army	Lieutenant Colonel A	For distinguished command and leadership in warlike operations as the Commanding Officer of the Special Operations Task Group 632 Rotation IV during Operation OKRA in Iraq during 2016.
Army	Colonel Gavin Michael Keating, CSC	For distinguished command and leadership in warlike operations as the Commander Task Group Taji Two on Operation OKRA in Iraq.
Air Force	Group Captain S	For distinguished command and leadership during Operation OKRA from September 2014 until April 2015.

=== Bar to the Distinguished Service Medal (DSM & Bar) ===
DSM & Bar ribbon

Branch	Recipient	Citation	Notes
Army	Major K, DSM	For distinguished leadership in warlike operations while deployed as the Officer Commanding, Commando Company Group with the Special Operations Task Group 632 Rotation IV during Operation OKRA in Iraq.

=== Distinguished Service Medal (DSM) ===
DSM ribbon

Branch	Recipient	Citation	Notes
Army	Colonel James Andrew Hammett	For distinguished leadership in warlike operations during Operation Okra, as the Training Task Unit Commander, Task Group Taji Two in Iraq from November 2015 until June 2016.
Army	Sergeant M	For distinguished leadership as the Force Protection Team Commander of the Special Operations Advisory Group on Operation HIGHROAD in Afghanistan during 2015.
Air Force	Group Captain B	For distinguished leadership as Commander Task Element 630.1.1 on Operation OKRA.
Air Force	Air Commodore G	For distinguished leadership as Director, Combined Air Operations Centre, Qatar on Operation OKRA.

=== Commendation for Distinguished Service ===
Commendation for Distinguished Service ribbon

Branch	Recipient	Citation	Notes
Navy	Petty Officer Kevin Michael Paul	For distinguished performance of duties in warlike operations as the Chief Counter Improvised Explosive Devices Training Advisor of the Afghan National Police Central Training Centre during Operation HIGHROAD.
Army	Brigadier Michael Herbert Annett, CSC	For distinguished performance of duties as the Commander, Task Group Afghanistan, Kabul on Operation HIGHROAD.
Army	Captain B	For distinguished performance of duty in warlike operations as a Special Forces Advisory Team Commander with the Special Operations Task Group 632 Rotation IV during Operation OKRA in Iraq.
Army	Major C	For distinguished performance of duty as an Intelligence Officer with the Special Operations Task Group 632 Rotation IV during Operation OKRA in Iraq during 2016.
Army	Major D	For distinguished performance of duty in warlike operations as a Special Forces Advisory Team Commander with the Special Operations Task Group 632 Rotation IV during Operation OKRA.
Army	Colonel Eamon Patrick Lenaghan, CSC	For distinguished performance of duty in warlike operations as the Chief of Plans for Combined Joint Forces Land Component Command, Operation INHERENT RESOLVE, Iraq.
Army	Captain N	For distinguished performance of duty on warlike operations as a Special Forces Advisory Team Commander with the Special Operations Task Group 632 Rotation IV during Operation OKRA in Iraq during 2016.
Army	WO I John James Stonebridge, BM, OAM	For distinguished performance of duties on warlike operations as the Regimental Sergeant Major of the 205th Corps Advisory Team in Kandahar, Afghanistan during Operation HIGHROAD.
Army	Sergeant Daniel Stephen Woodney	For distinguished performance of duties in warlike operations as Force Protection Platoon Sergeant on Operation OKRA.
Air Force	Squadron Leader B	For distinguished performance of duties, in both airborne leadership in action and operational planning as the Task Element 630.1.1 Flight Commander on Operation OKRA.
Air Force	Wing Commander J	For distinguished performance of duties as Commander Task Unit 630.2 and Australian Target Engagement Authority within the Combined Air Operations Centre on Operation OKRA during 2016.
Air Force	Flight Lieutenant T	For distinguished performance of duties on warlike operations as an F/A-18 fighter pilot in Iraq and Syria while a member of Task Element 630.1.1 on Operation OKRA during 2016.

=== Bar to the Conspicuous Service Cross (CSC & Bar) ===
CSC & Bar ribbon

Branch	Recipient	Citation	Notes
Navy	Commander William Le Mesurier Waters, CSC, RAN	For outstanding achievement and leadership in non-warlike operations as the Commanding Officer HMAS Melbourne on Operation MANITOU.

=== Conspicuous Service Cross (CSC) ===
CSC ribbon

Branch	Recipient	Citation	Notes
Navy	Commander Simon James Cannell, RAN	For outstanding achievement and devotion to duty in the field of maritime warfare capability development.
Navy	Commander Phillip Andrew Henry, RAN	For outstanding achievement as the Commanding Officer HMAS Darwin on Operation MANITOU during 2016.
Navy	Commander Marc Louis Pavillard, RAN	For outstanding devotion to duty and performance in the field of naval aviation command.
Navy	Commander Andrew Thomas Pepper, RAN	For outstanding devotion to duty as the Executive Officer HMAS Melbourne.
Navy	Commander Rachel Emma Thompson, RAN	For outstanding achievement in the field of Maritime Logistics and Health training management.
Navy	Captain Brendon Michael Zilko, RAN	For outstanding achievement as the Commissioning Executive Officer of HMAS Adelaide.
Army	Lieutenant Colonel Micah Batt, DSM	For outstanding achievement in the delivery of All Corps Ab-initio Officer Training for Army as the Commanding Officer and Chief Instructor of the Royal Military College - Duntroon.
Army	Lieutenant Colonel David Peter Benson	For outstanding achievement in furthering Army's diversity and inclusivity objectives as the Staff Officer Grade One Workforce Strategy in Army Headquarters.
Army	Lieutenant Colonel C	For outstanding achievement in the improvement and advancement of the Special Operations Intelligence Enterprise capability in Special Operations Command.
Army	Lieutenant Colonel Arran Pearce Hassell	For outstanding achievement as the Commanding Officer of the Defence Force School of Intelligence and Deputy Head of Corps, Australian Intelligence Corps.
Army	Lieutenant Colonel Roger James Holmes	For outstanding devotion to duty in the support and recovery of wounded, injured and ill members of the Australian Defence Force.
Army	Major Ben Gerard Lanskey	For outstanding achievement as Officer Commanding Depot Company, Royal Australian Regiment, School of Infantry and as the Operations Officer of the 51st Battalion, Far North Queensland Regiment.
Army	Chaplain Kerry Andrew Larwill	For outstanding achievement in Forces Command Chaplaincy, including coordination of Chaplaincy support to the Operation Reunite repatriation activity and implementation of the Chaplaincy Reporting Tool.
Army	Lieutenant Colonel James Anthony McGann	For outstanding achievement as the Commanding Officer of 2/17th Battalion and the inaugural Commanding Officer of the 5th and 8th Brigade Reinforcing Battle Group Waratah.
Army	Lieutenant Colonel Steven Maurice Stockley	For outstanding devotion to duty as Chief of Staff and Deputy Commandant of the Army Aviation Training Centre.
Army	Lieutenant Colonel Dean Richard Thompson	For outstanding achievement as Commanding Officer of the 1st Aviation Regiment.
Army	Lieutenant Colonel Anthony John Watson	For outstanding achievements in the improvement and sustainment of the deployable logistics capability.
Air Force	Flight Lieutenant Lauren Rachael Bishop	For outstanding achievement in logistics support to Heron remotely piloted aircraft operations for the Royal Australian Air Force.
Air Force	Wing Commander Joy Down	For outstanding achievement as the Project Manager of the Australian Defence Force Deployable Frozen Blood Project.
Air Force	Squadron Leader Scott Peter Egan	For outstanding devotion to duty as the Battlefield Airlift Transition Office Operations Pilot and the Number 35 Squadron C-27J Continental United States of America Detachment Commander during the acquisition and introduction of the C-27J Spartan aircraft capability.
Air Force	Squadron Leader Damien Luke Maldon	For outstanding devotion to duty in the engineering management and capability development of the additional KC-30A multi-role tanker transport aircraft acquisition and conversion.
Air Force	Warrant Officer John Lancaster Matthews	For outstanding devotion to duty to the C-27J Spartan battlefield airlifter acquisition project as the Technical Liaison Officer within the prime contractor in the United States of America.
Air Force	Warrant Officer Alisha O'Brien	For outstanding achievement as the Airman Aircrew Manager at Headquarters Air Mobility Group.
Air Force	Warrant Officer Neil Charles Pinker	For outstanding achievement in maintenance reform as the Warrant Officer Engineering at Number 36 Squadron, Royal Australian Air Force.
Air Force	Wing Commander Adele Schwonberg	For outstanding achievement in star rank and senior officer financial management and personnel administration in the Royal Australian Air Force.
Air Force	Warrant Officer Ryan Keith Wilson	For outstanding achievement as a Loadmaster Instructor at Number 285 Squadron, Number 84 Wing, Royal Australian Air Force.

=== Conspicuous Service Medal (CSM) ===
CSM ribbon
