= Ponsford =

Ponsford is a surname. Notable people with the surname include:

- Bill Ponsford (1900–1991), Australian cricketer
- Jennie Ponsford, Australian neuroscience researcher

== See also ==
- Ponsford, Minnesota, the unincorporated community in Becker County, Minnesota, United States
