= Cinderella Acappella =

Australian music group

- Origin: Australia
- Genres: Children's, A cappella
- Years active: 1993-1995
- Label: Rascal Records
- Members: Blair Greenberg; Jeannie Lewis; Margret RoadKnight; Moya Simpson

Cinderella Acappella were an Australian children's music act made up of Blair Greenberg, Jeannie Lewis, Margret RoadKnight and Moya Simpson performing songs written by John Shortis. Their self-titled album (released in 1994) was nominated for the ARIA Award for Best Children's Album in 1995.

== Performers ==
- Blair Greenberg
- Jeannie Lewis
- Margret RoadKnight
- Moya Simpson

== Discography ==
- Cinderella Acappella (1994) - Rascal Records

== Awards and nominations ==
| Year | Nominated works | Award | Result |
|---|---|---|---|
| 1995 | Cinderella Acappella | Best Children's Album | Nominated |
