= Jeannie Lewis =

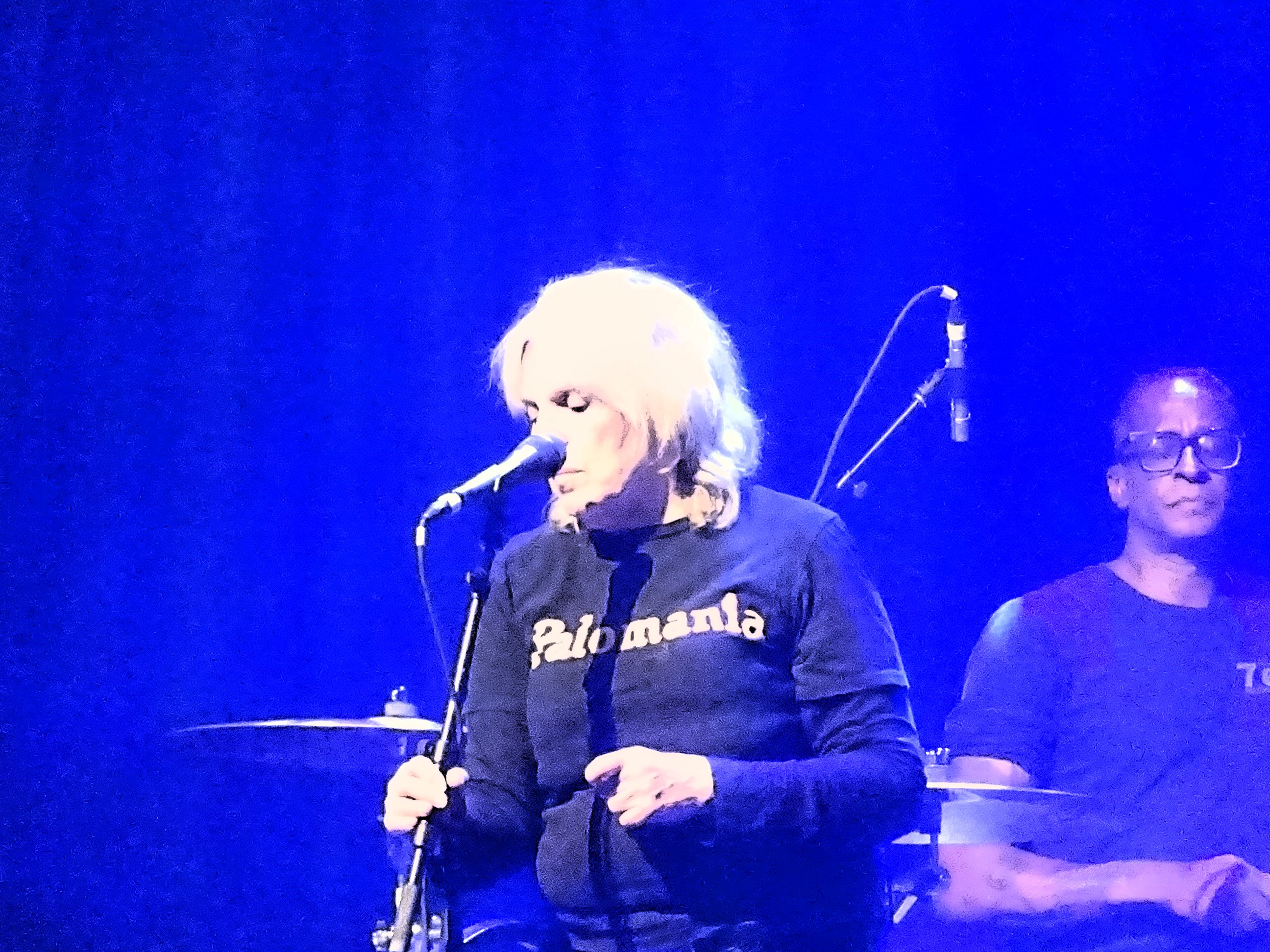
- Jeannie Lewis in 2025

Background information
- Born: Jean Ethel Lewis; 8 January 1945 (age 81)
- Origin: Sydney, New South Wales, Australia
- Genres: Jazz; folk; Latin; blues; opera; rock; fusion
- Occupations: Musician
- Instruments: Vocals; guitar
- Years active: 1964–present
- Labels: EMI; WEA; Larrikin/EMI
- Website: jeannielewis.com

Jean Ethel "Jeannie" Lewis (born 8 January 1945) is an Australian musician and stage performer whose work covers many different styles such as folk, jazz, Latin, blues, opera, rock and fusion. Her music often includes a strong social consciousness and political statements. Australian musicologist, Ian McFarlane, described her as "one of the most enigmatic and expressive, yet underrated singers Australia has ever produced... Always able to adapt her emotional and dramatic voice to suit a range of moods and styles."

== Early life ==
Jean Ethel Lewis was born in 1945 as the only daughter of Samuel Phineas Lewis (1901–1976), a school teacher and trade union official, and Ethel Caroline (née Teerman, c. 1908–1985), also a school teacher. She later recalled, "I grew up with left-wing parents who were not only good human beings, but whose dreams were about quality for everyone." She attended Sydney Girls High School and studied at the University of Sydney. She started "on a teaching scholarship, majoring in French and modern history."

Instead of teaching Lewis worked an office job and began her musical career in the 1960s in Sydney. She was a member of the York Gospel Singers alongside Alison MacCallum. and the Radiation Quartet. She sang with the Ray Price Jazz Quintet, the Nat Oliver Jazz Band and the Alan Lee Jazz Quintet. She was a member of the Sydney University Organising Committee for Action on Aboriginal Rights to organise action around National Aborigines Day on 8 July 1964.

She was arrested in a demonstration in May 1964 at Wynyard, and helped arrange folk singers for a concert in Hyde Park to raise funds for the Freedom Ride, as well as appearing in another fund-raising concert at Paddington Town Hall. She represented Australia at the International Festival of Contemporary Song in Cuba in 1967. Lewis was one of 67 demonstrators fined for "obstructing traffic", in May 1968 while protesting against conscription during the Vietnam War, out front of the Prime Minister's Lodge.

== 1970s ==
In February 1970 Lewis sang with progressive rockers, Tully, in a performance, Love 200, which used two vocalists, a light show by Roger Foley-Fogg a.k.a. Ellis D Fogg and the Sydney Symphony Orchestra. Created by Peter Sculthorpe, it was written to commemorate the bicentenary of Captain Cook's journey to plot the transit of Venus in 1770, which led to his "discovery" of Australia's east coast by the British explorer. Lewis, on lead vocals, was a member of a band, Gypsy Train, later in 1970; fellow members were Bobby Gebert on piano, John Helman on bass guitar (ex-Levi Smith's Clefs), Daryl McKenzie on drums, Kydric Shaw on guitar and Terry Wilson on vocals (of Tully).

In March 1972 Love 200 was staged in Adelaide, where Lewis performed with Fraternity, fronted by Bon Scott, and the Melbourne Symphony Orchestra. She recorded vocals for the Ray Price Jazz Quintet album, Spectrum (1971). In April of that year she performed in the Timeless Trip as part of the Fairlight Festival, near Mittagong, with eight other performers. She had to provide an acoustic set as the sound gear was not yet installed by the festival's organisers.

In 1972 Lewis performed songs, including the title track, for an Australian B-grade rock musical, science fiction-fantasy, film Shirley Thompson vs. the Aliens, directed by Jim Sharman. It was described as, "loathed by underground art-house and commercial managements alike". She worked on an "ill-fated rock opera", Terry and Frankie, in 1972. During November of that year she supported United States visitors, Buddy Guy, Junior Wells and Arthur Crudup.

Lewis released her first album, Free Fall Through Featherless Flight (October 1973), via EMI. It was recorded with Les Hodge producing and Michael Carlos on moog, organ and harpsichord (ex-Tully, Levi Smith's Clefs); Ken Firth on bass guitar (ex-Tully); Greg Henson on drums; Marcia Hines on backing vocals; Alan Lee on percussion; Jamie McKinley on piano; Mike Reid on guitar; Shayna Stewart on backing vocals (ex-Tully); Mike Wade on guitar; The Fidelio String Quartet and a wind section. The cover art was designed by Martin Sharp – Lewis had sung at the opening of his art exhibition in April of that year.

According to Australian musicologist, Ian McFarlane, "[it] included a breathtaking array of material like Graham Lowndes' 'Till Time Brings Change', Gulliver Smith and Jeremy Noone's 'It's Up to You' and Billy Green's adaptation of the Dylan Thomas poem 'Do not Go Gentle'." In 1974 it was awarded Best Female Vocal Album in the Australian Radio Record Awards. Fellow singer-songwriter, Bob Hudson, observed, "her appeal lies in the fact that when she is singing, what's happening up there on stage is for you, the audience, and you can feel it. She bleeds for the people she's singing to — she expresses the human condition."

Lewis was appointed to the Music Board of the Australia Council for the Arts in February 1973. With John Bell and Jon English, she worked in a rock musical, The Bacchoi, written by Bryan Nason and Ralph Tyrrell based on the story of Euripides. It was the first show for the Nimrod Theatre Company at Belvoir St in Surry Hills.

In 1974 a live album, Looking Backwards to Tomorrow, in and out of Concert, was released and performed on stage at the State Theatre in Sydney. McFarlane described how it features, "[her] renditions of songs by Ray Davies ('Celluloid Heroes'), Dory Previn ('Scared to Be Alone'), Stephen Sondheim ('Ladies Who Lunch'), Graham Lowndes ('The House Is Burning') and the Rev. Gary Davies ('Cocaine Blues' with backing provided by the Foreday Riders)."

Her next album, Tears of Steel & The Clowning Cavaleras was a double album released in 1976 to go with a multi-media performance featuring song, theatre, dance and visuals, which had premiered at the York Theatre, Seymour Centre in the preceding November. The project was partly inspired by Pablo Neruda's poem, "Tears of Steel", and the Mexican celebration, Day of the Dead, which includes the use of calaveras – mock skeletons paraded through the streets. Alongside Lewis in the show were Carlos, Reid, Dave Ellis, Roger Frampton, Phillip Godden, Mike McGurk and John Sangster. It was produced and directed by Ted Robinson with Sharp designing the sets.

In 1975 Lewis was awarded a study grant of A$8000 from the Australia Council for the Arts to travel overseas from February 1976; she spent almost three years in Central and South America and returned late in 1978. She later explained to Clive Simmons of The Canberra Times, how she was, "shocked and appalled by the grinding poverty she saw there, and by the cruelty and barbarity of the military dictatorships which governed those nations. By the time she returned, she had been radicalised by the experience."

In 1979 with her band, Jeannie Lewis and the Company She Keeps, she created and performed a series of shows: From Maroubra to Mexico. Peter Ross of Tharunka observed, "she had full houses at the Kirk for her show. From Maroubra to Mexico, the Multinational Stomp. At these concerts she revealed a renewed dedication to social and political change." In July of that year she supported John McLaughlin on his Australian tour. Lewis devised a cabaret show, Krazy for You, using material by Noël Coward, Nick Lowe, and Bruce Springsteen, which she performed during 1979–80.

== 1980s ==
Lewis issued a compilation album, Till Time Brings Change, in 1980. She appeared in the title role of Piaf at the Comedy Theatre, Melbourne in September. In November 1981 Lewis took the role of Low Dive Jenny, a world weary hooker, in the State Theatre Company of South Australia's production of Brecht's The Threepenny Opera. The Canberra Times' theatre critic, Ken Healey observed, "the best way to describe, and praise, the singing is to recall that [Lewis] was the best but not the only singer on stage. There was never a moment when one felt that here was a singer acting while beside her were actors singing."

She devised, with John Derum, Piaf, the Songs and the Story, which premiered at the Princess Theatre, Melbourne in February 1982. Again, she took the title role. It included four national tours, with an associated soundtrack album released in that year. Also in 1982 Lewis created and performed For a Dancer about her mother's life; it premiered at the Adelaide Festival. Ethel had been diagnosed with Alzheimer's disease and Lewis "would sing the golden oldies to her — what I call the left-wing hit parade — in the hope that they would bring her something."

In May 1982 Lewis supported and performed at an anti-mining rally in Broken Hill against the proposed the Honeymoon Uranium Mine. She presented a new show, So You Want Blood, in 1983 and released an album of the same name in September. In the following year she appeared in Ta Paratragouda at the Athens Festival, Melbourne. From April to May 1984 she was in Carmen, Another Perspective with the Melbourne Theatre Company at the Russell Street Theatre. She performed Ta Paratragouda in Melbourne, again, which was recorded for SBS and Greek TV.

Lewis travelled overseas in 1987, representing Australia on a tour of Mexico with The Necks for the Cervantes International Arts Festival; it later became a one-hour SBS TV documentary, Maroubra to Mexico. She also sang in Paul Robeson's stage show, Deep Bells Ring and performed Pilgrimages, for which she wrote the text and Jim Cotter wrote the music, dedicated to a friend with AIDS.

== 1990s ==
Lewis had a new show, Voxy Lady, at the Adelaide Festival in 1990; it had Llew Kiek as musical director, Lois Ellis as stage director. One of its songs, "Yesterday, Today and Tomorrow", later appeared on her 2003 CD, SouthHeart. The Green Left Weekly's Angela Matheson described the next project, People Like Us, at the Seymour Centre in March 1991: "A female quintet which includes Margret RoadKnight and Jeannie Lewis provides an aural chorus drawing upon a history of music ranging from Hildegard Von Bingen to Cambodian folk songs". It was directed by Peter Kingston with musical direction by Mara Kiek.

In 1992 Lewis devised a cabaret of contemporary love songs, Dangerous Lovers. In the following year she sang a track, "The Plains of Emu", on a various artists' album, Going Home – Australian Artists, Australian Songs, for ABC Records. Also in 1993 she received an Australia Council for the Arts Grant to study Extended Voice Techniques at Roy Hart International Theatre Centre in France and the tango in its sung form in Buenos Aires.

Lewis performed alongside Margret RoadKnight, Moya Simpson (of Shortis and Simpson) and Blair Greenberg, at the Sydney Opera House for the 1995 season of Cinderella Acappella, which is a collection of children's songs, written by Simpson's partner, John Shortis. It was recorded as an album by a group of the same name and was released in 1994. It was nominated for the ARIA Award for Best Children's Album in 1995. Also in 1995 the singer performed in, Viva Diva, a series of concerts featuring original work and music from Greece, Tibet, Beijing, South Africa, Argentina, the Netherlands, Corsica and France. She released an album, Tango Australis, in 1998, which is based on her concert program of that name.

Lewis performed with Annie Deller-Peterson, Leah Cotterell, Bronwyn Calcutt, Katrina Alberts and Alison St Ledger, in Women in Voice 7 in Brisbane in July 1997. Lynda Hansen of Green Left Weekly described her as, "a long-time international performer and writer, delighted the crowd with excerpts from her new show The Baglady Hits Out." In September of that year she was awarded a fellowship at Varuna, The Writers' House, "to work on a performance script."

In 1998 Lewis performed at the Homeless Women's Speakout at the YWCA, and in the Port Fairy Folk Festival, She appeared in "Life, Love, Death and the Weather – a collaboration with dancers Chrissie Koltai, Anka Frankenhauser, Patrick Harding-Irmer, musician Steve Blau, performed at the Performance Space as part of Dance Week." Architect's Desk and The Wig of Larks – The Bag Lady Calls The Tune were performances from the following year. "In November 1999 Lewis collaborated with flamenco dancer Veronica Gillmer on the production Camerino, at Sydney's Tom Mann Theatre."

== 2000s ==
One Word We was staged for a second time, opening on 8 January 2000, with Lewis as one of the seven singers. It was originally performed in 1995. By Maurie Mulheron, covering the songs and life of Pete Seeger. It was performed at the New Theatre at Newtown and later, in 2001 at the Woodford Folk Festival. A CD with the same name has been produced and it is said that the show was being edited for a documentary.

The Palais, a building sings of lives lived in music was at the Parramatta Town Hall, 27–30 July 2000. The show involved more than fifty performers in more than 20 acts and was spread through most of the building. Urban Theatre Projects produced the show. Lewis also performed in the East Timor Year One Celebration to mark and celebrate the first anniversary of East Timor's historic U.N. Referendum on self-determination at Leichhardt on 30 August 2000.

In May 2001 she received an $80,000 Fellowship grant from the Australia Council, which she used to create Southheart. "All this SOUThHEART thing began with me wondering why the lyrics of so many tangos refer to the south. The tango which inspired it, this delving into the bottom of my heart, was Corazon al Sur – Heart to the South. --That song from the south of Argentina, that south talks to me so much of this south and the shadow of my mother in the garden in Maroubra." Lewis was a part of the East Timor Independence Day Celebrations in 2002. She performed in the Trade Union Concert in 2003 and in a tribute to Timorese women concert, in 2004. Also in 2004 being part of the May Day music festival in South Australia.

In 2009 Jeannie Lewis gave the Seventeenth Annual Bell Jazz Lecture.

== Discography ==
=== Studio albums ===
Title	Details	Peak chart positions
Title	Details	AUS
Free Fall Through Featherless Flight	Released: October 1973; Label: EMI ( EMC 2505); Format: LP	—
Tears of Steel & the Clowning Cavaleras	Released: May 1976; Label: EMI (EME.1001/2); Format: 2xLP	82
Piaf - The Songs and the Story	Released: 1982; Label: WEA (600114); Format: LP, CS	—
So U Want Blood	Released: 1983; Label: Larrikin Records (LRF134); Format: LP, CS	—
Tango Australis	Released: 1998; Label: Sole Music (SOLE 2); Format: CD	—
Women 'n Blues (with Wendy Saddington, Kate Dunbar, Margret RoadKnight and Sally King)	Released: 2003; Label: Full House Records (FHR 021); Format: CD	—
South Heart	Released: 2003; Format: 2x CD	—

=== Live albums ===
Title	Details	Peak chart positions
Title	Details	AUS
Looking Backwards to Tomorrow, in and out of Concert	Released: November 1974; Label: EMA ( 307); Format: LP	50

=== Compilation albums ===
Title	Details
Till Time Brings Change	Released: 1980; Label: EMI; Format: LP

=== Other appearances ===
- Folk Concert on Campus (as Jean Lewis), 1965
- Spectrum, Ray Price Jazz Quintet, 1971
- Three Floors Down, 1972
- Gallery Concerts, the Alan Lee Quartet & Friends, 1973
- Going Home : Australian artists, Australian songs, 1993
- Cinderella Acappella, 1994
- One Word ... WE! The Songs and Story of Pete Seeger and Friends, 2000
- Green Songs, 2001
- The Good Old Bad Old Days, Sydney Jazz Club Golden Jubilee 1953–2003, 2003
- Azadi: Songs of Liberation, 2005

== Awards and nominations ==
=== Australian Women in Music Awards ===
The Australian Women in Music Awards is an annual event that celebrates outstanding women in the Australian Music Industry who have made significant and lasting contributions in their chosen field. They commenced in 2018.

Year	Nominee / work	Award	Result	Ref.
2023	Jeannie Lewis	Lifetime Achievement Award	awarded	
