= Karyn Walsh =

Australian social justice advocate

Karyn Joan Walsh AM is an Australian social justice advocate.

Walsh is known for her work as a founding member of the not-for-profit organisation Micah Projects where she is the chief executive officer.

The organisation was established in 1995 based on a St Mary's social justice initiative known as Project Micah, with an aim to engage with people experiencing various forms of adversity. The organisation's name relates to the prophet Micah who, according to Micah 6:8, said "Act Justly, Love Tenderly, Walk Humbly".

Walsh is credited with working with the Department of Housing and other agencies during the COVID-19 pandemic in Queensland to ensure 1,700 people such as the homeless and those escaping domestic violence to emergency housing during the lockdowns.

Walsh originally trained as a nurse at the Mater Hospital in Rockhampton in the 1970s during which time she volunteered at a women's shelter and became the city's first outreach youth worker for the homeless.

During her career, Walsh has served in numerous roles including as the president of the Queensland Council of Social Services, as a former executive member of the National Coalition for Gun Control, as a former coordinator of the Domestic Violence Resource Centre, as a member of the Domestic and Family Violence Prevention Implementation Council, as co-chair of Queensland's Anti-Poverty Week, as a council member at the Queensland Mental Health Commission and as a director of the Australian Alliance to End Homelessness.

In recognition of her work in the field for over 40 years, Walsh was awarded an honorary Doctor of Social Work and Nursing from the University of Queensland in 2016.

In the 2017 Queen's Birthday Honours, Walsh was made a Member of the Order of Australia for her service to the community, supporting people with mental health issues, the homeless and children through various social welfare initiatives.

Walsh was named as a Queensland Great in 2021 as a reward for her social justice advocacy.
