= Wendy Jenkins =

Australian editor and poet

Wendy Elizabeth Jenkins AM (1952 – December 2022) was an Australian poet and editor at Fremantle Press for 43 years. She also wrote as Jenna Kinsey.

== Life ==
Jenkins was born in Perth, Western Australia. She was the fourth generation of her family to live in Fremantle.

As an editor at Fremantle Press, Jenkins reviewed over 10,000 manuscripts. One of them was Albert Facey's, A Fortunate Life, which she discovered early in her career and later described as "an important social document as well as a compelling personal story simply told". Other writers whose work she nurtured include John Kinsella, Joan London and Kim Scott.

She served on the Literature Board of the Australia Council from 1985 to 1987.

Jenkins retired from Fremantle Press in 2019, after 43 years' service.

She died in December 2022, aged 70.

== Awards and recognition ==
Jenkins was joint winner of the Western Australian Sesquicentenary Literary Competition's short story prize for "Uneasy Rider" in 1979. She and Ray Coffey won the Special Award at the 1986 Western Australian Premier's Book Awards for Portrait: A West Coast Collection.

Jenkins was appointed a Member of the Order of Australia in the 2017 Queen's Birthday Honours in recognition of her contribution to literature as author, editor and publisher and for her mentoring of Australian writers.

== Selected works ==
=== Poetry ===
- Out of Water into Light, 1979
- Rogue Equations, 2000

=== Young adult novels ===
- Hot News, as Jenna Kinsey, 1990, republished 1997 as Jenkins
- Killer Boots, 1996
- The Big Game, 1998
- Gunna Burn, 2000

=== As editor ===
- Portrait: A West Coast Collection, co-edited with Ray Coffey, 1986
- No Substitute: Prose, Poems, Images, co-edited with Terri-Ann White, Anna Gibbs and Noel King, 1990
- Reading from the Left, editor, 1994
- The Moving World: Poems, by Michael Heald, 2011
