= Mike McColl-Jones =

Australian comedy writer

Mike McColl Jones OAM
- Born: 12 August 1937; Kew, Victoria, Australia
- Died: 11 March 2024 (aged 86)
- Occupation: television comedy writer
- Known for: Writing material for variety TV programs particularly those aired on Melbourne's GTV-9
- Television: In Melbourne Tonight

Michael McColl-Jones (12 August 1937 − 11 March 2024) was an Australian television comedy writer.

He is best remembered for his association with television personalities such as Graham Kennedy, Don Lane and Bert Newton.

== Early and personal life ==
McColl-Jones attended Xavier College in Melbourne where he excelled at tennis. He attended the school at the same time as Philip Brady.

McColl-Jones left school in 1956 and joined Myer as a salesman. When television started in Melbourne, McColl-Jones began submitting jokes to In Melbourne Tonight which were regularly used by Graham Kennedy. Despite McColl-Jones' contributions, an offer of permanent work wasn't made until 1963 when GTV-9's general manager Colin Bednall offered him permanent work.

His father Hector died in 1963 at the age of 57 from a form of leukemia.

== Career ==
Throughout his career, McColl-Jones wrote for In Melbourne Tonight, The Graham Kennedy Show, The Don Lane Show, The Bert Newton Show, The Ernie Sigley Show, The Peter Couchman Show, Blankety Blanks, Hey Hey It's Saturday and Tonight Live with Steve Vizard. He also wrote for Joan Rivers and a number of Royal Command Performances.

When In Melbourne Tonight was revived in 1996, McColl-Jones again wrote jokes for the show, this time hosted by Frankie J. Holden.

However, it was his association with Kennedy that McColl-Jones is arguably best known for, having written jokes for Kennedy from 1958 to 1975.

=== Books ===
McColl-Jones wrote a number of books throughout his career including My Funny Friends in 1979, And now, here's... in 1999 and Graham Kennedy Treasures: Friends remember the King in 2008.

== Honours ==
In the 2017 Queen's Birthday Honours, McColl-Jones received a Medal of the Order of Australia in recognition of his service to the performing arts as a comedy writer for television.
