= James Hogan (businessman) =

Australian airline executive

James Hogan AO FRAeS
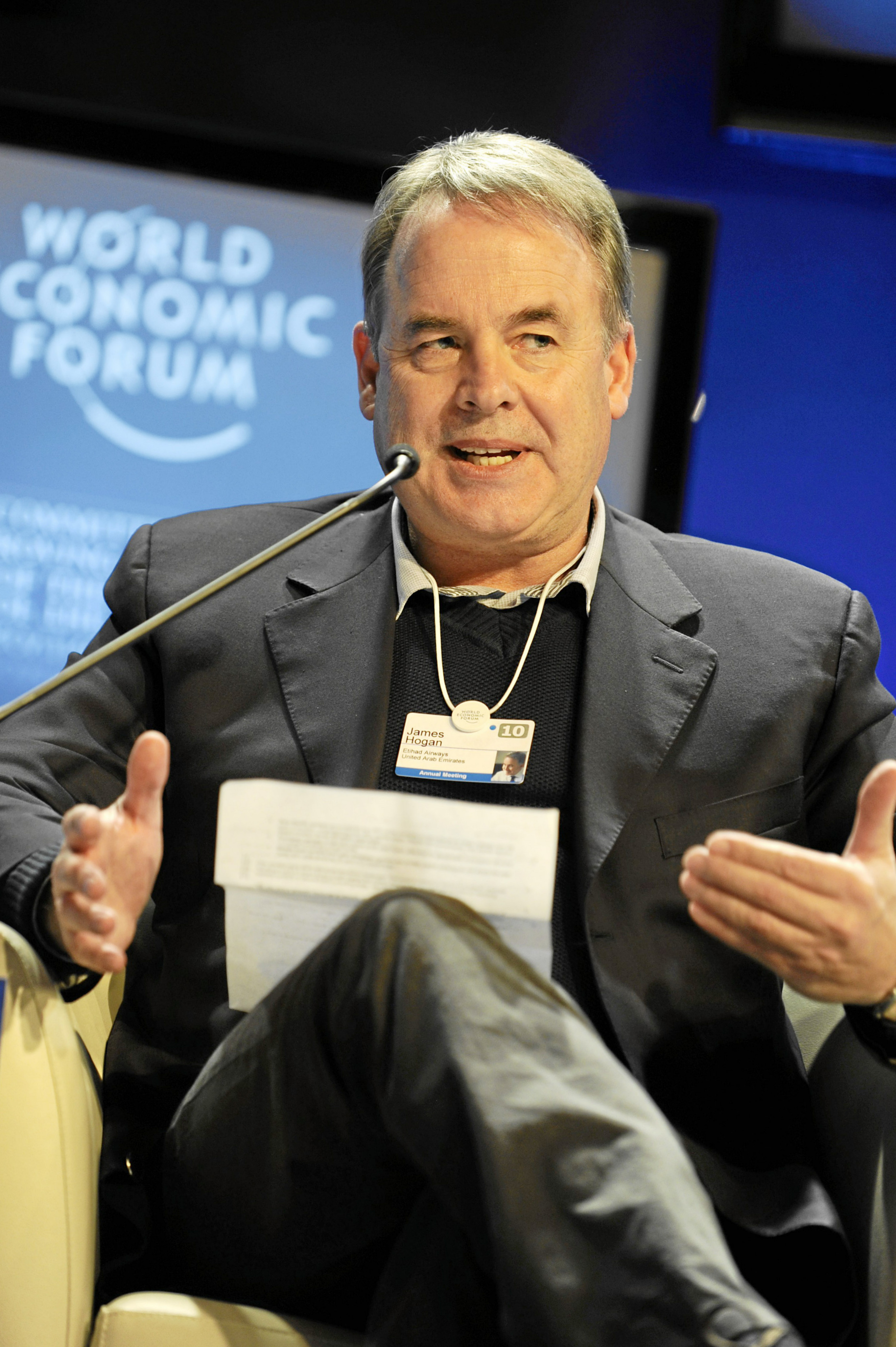
- James Hogan at the World Economic Forum annual meeting in Davos, 2010
- Occupation: Airline executive

James Reginald Hogan, AO, FRAeS is an Australian airline executive who is the founder and chairman of aviation advisory and investment firm Knighthood Global.

He was the previous President and CEO of Etihad Airways from 2006 to 2017. He was also the previous CEO of Gulf Air from 2002 to 2006.

== Early life ==
James Hogan grew up in Melbourne, Victoria, and attended Ivanhoe Grammar School, graduating in 1975.

== Career ==
=== Early career ===
James Hogan began his career in 1975 at Ansett Airlines as an ordinary employee including check-in assistant. He subsequently held senior positions with Hertz Corporation, where his roles included directorships of the marketing, sales, and operations divisions. In 1995 he joined the London-based executive management committee as Vice President of Marketing and Sales for Europe, the Middle East, and Africa. In 1997 Hogan became service director for British Midland International (BMI), leaving in 1998 to join the Granada Group as worldwide sales director, where he sat on the board of Forte Hotels. He returned to BMI in 1999 as chief operating officer, where he was responsible for flight and ground operations, sales and marketing, commercial, cargo, engineering and handling service companies; he was a member of the board of directors.

In 2001 Hogan moved back to his native Australia, where he was appointed chief executive of the Tesna consortium, which was created with the aim of acquiring Ansett Airlines from administration.

=== Gulf Air ===
In May 2002, he joined Gulf Air as CEO. In December 2002 he instigated a restructuring and turnaround programme in response to a drastic fall in profits and increasing debt. Gulf Air recorded a profit of US$4 million in 2004 before returning to losses. He resigned his position in July 2006 and left Gulf Air at the end of September.

=== Etihad Airways ===
On 10 September 2006, he was appointed president and CEO of Etihad Airways, the UAE flag carrier based in Abu Dhabi. He oversaw Etihad's rapid growth to serving 86 passenger and cargo destinations in the Middle East, Africa, Europe, Asia, Australia, and the Americas, operating a fleet of 120 aircraft.

Etihad reported its first full-year net profit in 2011, of $14 million, in line with its strategic plan goals announced in 2006. In February 2013 the airline announced a net profit of $42 million for 2012.

He oversaw Etihad's strategy of creating a network through acquisitions of minority stakes in other airlines, specifically Air Berlin (29.21%), Air Seychelles (40%), Aer Lingus (2.987%), Virgin Australia (24.9%), Air Serbia (49%), Darwin Airline (33%), Jet Airways (24%) and Alitalia (49%).

On 27 April 2016 Etihad reported a net profit of US$103 million for 2015. In May, the management structure was reshuffled, as Hogan became CEO of the airline's parent company, Etihad Aviation Group. Peter Baumgartner, formerly the airline's Chief Commercial Officer, became CEO of the airline, reporting to Hogan. In December Handelsblatt Global reported that Hogan was going to be dismissed after a "failed spree of acquisitions in Europe."

On 24 January 2017, the Etihad Aviation Group Board of Directors announced that Hogan (along with Group CFO James Rigney) would be stepping down "in the second half of 2017". Former CEO Peter Baumgartner returned as acting CEO of the group as it faced mounting losses from its investments in Air Berlin and Alitalia. On 2 May 2017 Alitalia filed for bankruptcy. Hogan and Rigney left Etihad later that month. On 27 July Etihad reported a loss of US$1.873 billion for 2016. On 15 August Air Berlin filed for bankruptcy after Etihad withdrew its financial support. Etihad reported a net loss of US$1.52 billion for 2017.

=== Knighthood Global ===
Hogan is now the founder and chairman of Knighthood Capital, based in Switzerland.

== Affiliations and awards ==
Hogan is a fellow of the Royal Aeronautical Society and a former non-executive director, and member of the board's Audit Committee, of the Gallaher Group. In 2010, he served as the chairman of the Aviation Travel and Tourism Governors at the World Economic Forum in Davos, Switzerland. He currently serves on the executive committee of the World Travel and Tourism Council. In June 2011 he was appointed to the International Air Transport Association (IATA) Board of Governors.

CEO Middle East magazine named him Aviation CEO of the Year in 2008 and Visionary of the Year in 2010. He won the CAPA Airline Executive of the Year 2012 Award at the Centre for Aviation's global awards for excellence and leadership in 2012.

In the Australian 2017 Queen's Birthday Honours List, Hogan was appointed an Officer of the Order of Australia (AO).
