= Susannah Fullerton =

Australian writer (born 1960)

Susannah Fullerton OAM FRSN
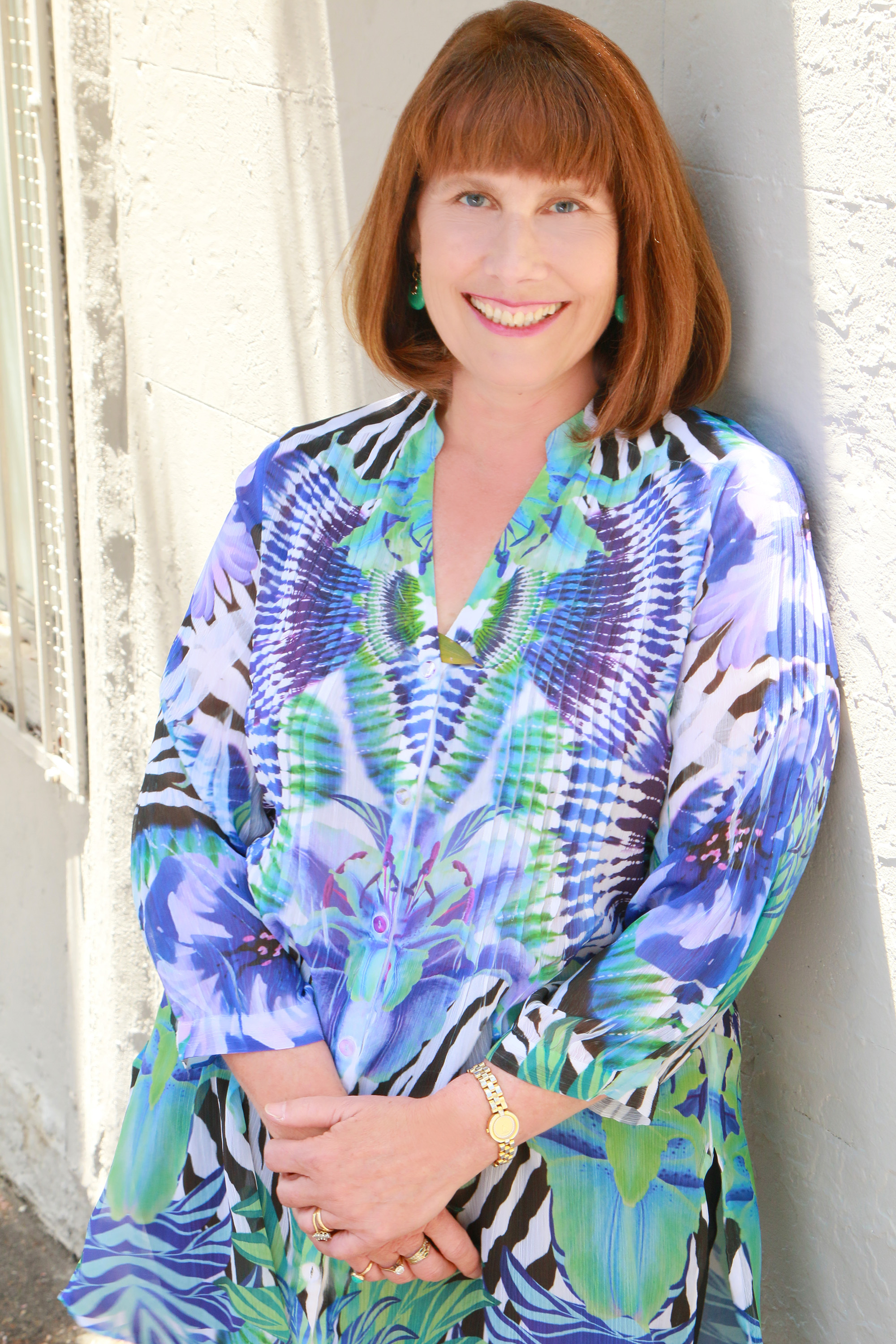
- Born: 1960 (age 65–66); Edmonton, Alberta, Canada
- Occupations: Author, literary historian

Susannah Fullerton (born 1960) is a Canadian-born Australian author and literary historian. She has been president of the Jane Austen Society of Australia since 1996, which is the largest literary society in Australia. She is also patron of the Rudyard Kipling Society of Australia, and patroness of The International Georgette Heyer Society. Her subject matter includes Jane Austen, Charles Dickens, Anthony Trollope, the Mitford family, Samuel Pepys, Vita Sackville-West, Oscar Wilde, George Eliot, the Romantic Poets, and Shakespeare.

== Biography ==
Born in Edmonton, Alberta, in 1960, Fullerton moved with her family to New Zealand while still young. She was first introduced to Jane Austen when she was ten and her mother read Pride and Prejudice to her. Fullerton has become a popular literary lecturer in Australia. She has lectured at the Art Gallery of NSW, the State Library of New South Wales, at libraries, schools and clubs. She is a registered speaker for Australia Decorative and Fine Arts Societies (ADFAS). In the 2017 Queen's Birthday Honours List she received an Order of Australia Medal of the Order (OAM) for Services to Literature. She has said Austen's writing remains popular because it "is still so relevant today".

She was involved in getting the statue of Charles Dickens back into Centennial Park, New South Wales and, along with Miriam Margolyes, spoke at the unveiling of that statue.

== Writing ==
Fullerton's book, Jane Austen and Crime (2004), explores Austen's childhood fascination with crime and the way that crime and punishment affected her life. Brief Encounters (2009) is a collection of writers' narratives of their travels through early colonized Australia, of which the Hectate's Australian Women's Book Review said was only lacking in women's voices.

Fullerton's 2013 book, Celebrating Pride and Prejudice, describes the history and contemporary reception of Austen's book Pride and Prejudice. Celebrating Pride and Prejudice also describes spin-offs of the original book and the reasons why Elizabeth Bennet and Mr. Darcy are such beloved characters. Star Tribune praised the book for its use of illustrations which were "as much fun as the text." The Sydney Morning Herald called Celebrating Pride and Prejudice "an intelligent and generous companion to Pride and Prejudice: its author and her era, characters, language, reception, adaptions, industry."

== Selected publications ==
- Jane Austen – Antipodean Views. Wellington Lane, 2001 ISBN 9780908022168
- Jane Austen and Crime. Jones Books, 2004 ISBN 9780958115827
- Brief Encounters: Literary Travelers in Australia, 1836–1939. Pan Macmillan, 2009 ISBN 9781405039505
- A Dance with Jane Austen: How a Novelist and her Characters went to the Ball. Frances Lincoln, 2012 ISBN 9780711232457
- Happily Ever After: Celebrating Jane Austen's Pride and Prejudice. Frances Lincoln, 2013. Published in the US as Celebrating Pride and Prejudice: 200 Years of Jane Austen's Masterpiece. Voyageur Press, 2013 ISBN 9780711233744
- Finding Katherine Mansfield. audio CD, Crimson Cats, 2009 ISBN 9780955875243
- Poetry to Fill a Room. audio CD, 2016
- Jane & I: A Tale of Austen Addiction. JASA, 2017 ISBN 9780646969435
