= Margret RoadKnight =

Australian singer (born 1943)

- Born: July 1943 (age 83); Melbourne, Victoria, Australia
- Genres: folk, jazz, blues
- Occupation: Singer
- Instrument: Vocals
- Years active: 1963–present
- Labels: Move, Jazznote, Infinity/Festival

Margret RoadKnight (born in July 1943) is an Australian singer-guitarist. In a career spanning more than five decades, she has sung in a wide variety of styles including blues, jazz, gospel, comedy, cabaret, and folk. In January 1976 she released a cover version of Bob Hudson's album track, "Girls in Our Town", as a single, which reached the Kent Music Report Singles Chart Top 100.

== Biography ==
Margret RoadKnight was born in July 1943 in Melbourne. She had no formal singing lessons, "harmonizing with my mother and sister while we did the housework that sort of thing and the usual school choir and church choir." For her secondary education RoadKnight attended Santa Maria Ladies College, Northcote. She became a recreation worker in East Melbourne and "taught art and craft, games and sport to kids from 3 to 17 years old for two and an half years." RoadKnight's early inspirations were Harry Belafonte, Odetta and Nina Simone. Her first performance was on Mother's Day, May 1963 at the Emerald Hill Theatre. Her mother was in attendance at the debut gig, but she died in the following year. RoadKnight replaced Judith Durham (who was joining rising folk quartet The Seekers) as lead singer of the trad jazz band Frank Traynor's Jazz Preachers at Frank Traynor's Folk and Jazz Club, for a weekly residency.

In the 1960s and 1970s, RoadKnight appeared on numerous television programmes including Folkmoot, hosted by Leonard Teale, Dave's Place, hosted by the Kingston Trio's Dave Guard, and the Australian Broadcasting Corporation's national weekly current affairs program, Open-End. RoadKnight's debut album was a live set, People Get Ready (November 1973), which was recorded at Frank Traynor's Folk Club. Her backing band for the night were Ian Clarke on drums and percussion; Martin Doley on guitars and backing vocals; Peter Doley on flute, kazoo, maracas and backing vocals; Peter Howell on bass guitar; and Bob Vinnard on piano, organ and backing vocals. According to Australian musicologist, Ian McFarlane, she provided "covers of material by the likes of Curtis Mayfield, Duke Ellington, Joni Mitchell and Malvina Reynolds."

RoadKnight and Dutch Tilders issued a split album, Australian Jazz of the 70s Vol. 5: The Blues Singers (1974). The Canberra Times's Michael Foster described her as a "big, big-voiced and big-hearted woman" and she "sings with that same gut-tearing intensity but tends to give more prominence to the traditional blues, the songs which blossomed in the dusty earth of the plantations." He felt that "Of all the women I have heard singing the blues Miss Roadknight comes closest to the sound of-the great: exponents... of another generation, Ma Rainey and Bessie Smith." At the end of that year, she received a government travel grant to study contemporary music in the United States.

In January 1976 she released a cover version of Bob Hudson's album track, "Girls in Our Town", as a single, which reached the Kent Music Report Singles Chart Top 40. According to Rachael Lucas of Australian Broadcasting Corporation's Open the track "painted a cruel trajectory for teenage girls living in country towns; teenage school drop outs, lonely cashiers and factory workers, with nothing to keep them entertained but vanity and promiscuity." RoadKnight included the single on her third album, Margret RoadKnight, which was issued in October 1976. It appeared on the Infinity label via Festival Records and was co-produced by Russell Dunlop (of Ayers Rock), Simon Heath and Wahanui Wynyard. Her second single from the album is "Love Tastes Like Strawberries".

From August 1977 the singer travelled and performed across Europe and the US for six months. Her fourth album, Ice, appeared in 1978; it included material written by fellow Australians. Also in that year she issued "Raw Deal" as a non-album single – the theme song for a feature film of the same name from the previous year. Foster's colleague, Brownwyn Watson, caught RoadKnight's gig in July 1978: the singer had "a striking presence on stage and her folk-blues combination of songs were sometimes amusing, sometimes sad." Late that year she performed in China as a member of the Australian Theatre People's Group.

In 1980 RoadKnight and two friends formed the promotional group Honky Tonk Angels (which also became the name of her record label) to mount the first Australian solo tour by the acclaimed American singer-songwriter and slide guitarist Ellen McIlwaine, who toured Australian capital cities in November 1980 (with RoadKnight as the support act) to great critical acclaim.

Her next album, Out of Fashion... Not Out of Style (1981) included another single, "I'll Be Gone" – a cover version of Spectrum's 1971 number-one hit. The album was co-produced by RoadKnight with Warren Barnett. Her backing group were Judy Bailey on keyboards; Bob Hudson on harmonica; Sandy Kogan on Jew's harp and washboard; Graham Lowndes on vocals and acoustic guitar; Ellen McIllwaine on vocals, slide guitar and organ; Steve Murphy on guitar; Chris Qua on bass guitar and Willie Qua on drums. Garry Raffaele, another The Canberra Times reporter, saw her at a Sydney show where "she moves from traditional blues to traditional Australian to Miles Davis, then to Evita. Such eclecticism is admirable for its intent... [she] almost carries it off... Her strength is in the blues – Ma Rainey stuff; this is what she docs best. She is not Evita nor is she Elkie Brookes."

RoadKnight's first compilation album, Living in the Land of Oz, appeared in 1984, which included her version of the title track – a cover of Ross Wilson's track for the 1976 film, Oz. Robert Christgau rated the album as B+ and felt that "she musters an impressively gruff blues timbre and on occasion some rudimentary swing, I'm not convinced she always goes flat on purpose, and when she emotes she may strain the credulity even of those who set their standards by Nick Cave and Olivia Newton-John." During 1984 RoadKnight also acted as promoter for the second Australian tour by Ellen Mcilwaine.

In February 1987 she was a member of Je Ne Sais Choir, along with Jarnie Birmingham, Mara Kiek and Moya Simpson. That choir supported Frankie Armstrong's tour of Australia. Also in 1987 and 1988 RoadKnight, as well as performing, was the musical director of Deep Bells Ring, a musical theatre presentation of Paul Robeson's songs and biography.

By October 1993 Je Ne Sais Choir were renamed as Girls in Your Town and they undertook their own tour. According to Foster the a cappella quartet sing "songs of the '50s and '60s along with gospel, jazz, drinking, and barbershop songs and African chants."

== Discography ==
=== Albums ===
List of albums, with selected details and chart positions
Title	Album details	Peak chart positions
Title	Album details	AUS
People Get Ready	Released: 1973; Format: LP; Label: Move (MS 3009)	—
Australian Jazz of the 70s Vol. 5: The Blues Singers (split album by Margret RoadKnight and Dutch Tilders)	Released: 1974; Format: LP; Label: Jazznote (JNLP-009/S)	—
Margret RoadKnight	Released: October 1976; Format: LP, cassette; Label: Infinity/Festival (L-36045)	83
Ice	Released: 1978; Format: LP, cassette; Label: Infinity/Festival (L-36334)	93
Out of Fashion... Not Out of Style	Released: 1981; Format: LP, cassette; Label: Infinity/Festival (L-37538)	—
Living in the Land of Oz	Released: 1984; Format: LP, cassette; Label: Infinity/Festival (L-38297); Note: Compilation album	—
Moving Target	Released: 1988; Format: LP, cassette, CD; Label: Sandstock Music (SSM 028)	—
Fringe Benefits	Released: 1993; Format: CD, cassette; Label: Honky Tonk Angels (HTAS)	—
At The School Of Arts Cafe	Released: 1996; Format: CD; Label: Larrikin (lrf468)	—
Women 'n Blues (with Wendy Saddington, Kate Dunbar, Jeannie Lewis and Sally King)	Released: 2003; Label: Full House Records (FHR 021); Format: CD	—
Decade: '75-'84	Released: 2013; Format: LP, cassette; Label: Festival, Warner (FEST601015); Note: Compilation album	—
Long Time (Recordings 1988 - 2023)	Released: 27 October 2023; Format: CD; Label: Chapter Music (CH192); Note: Compilation album	—

=== Singles ===
List of singles, with selected chart positions
Title	Year	Peak chart positions	Album
Title	Year	AUS	Album
"Girls in Our Town"	1976	53	Margret Roadknight
"Love Tastes Like Strawberries"	1976	—	Margret Roadknight
"Raw Deal"	1978	—	Raw Deal soundtrack
"I'll Be Gone"	1981	—	Out Of Fashion... Not Out of Style

== Awards and nominations ==
=== Australian Women in Music Awards ===
The Australian Women in Music Awards is an annual event that celebrates outstanding women in the Australian Music Industry who have made significant and lasting contributions in their chosen field. They commenced in 2018.

Year	Nominee / work	Award	Result
2018	Margret RoadKnight	Lifetime Achievement Award	awarded
