= Shortis and Simpson =

Australian entertainment duo

- Origin: Canberra, Australian Capital Territory, Australia
- Genres: Political satire, children's, choral
- Years active: 1991–present
- Members: John Shortis; Moya Simpson

Shortis and Simpson are an Australian entertainment and political satire duo composed of John Damien Shortis and Moya Simpson. They are singers, composers, political satirists and cabaret artists as well as producers and writers of wide-ranging performance genres. John Shortis (born 1948 in Earlwood, New South Wales) is a satirist, singer, songwriter, composer, social historian, and political commentator. Moya Simpson (born 1948 in Twickenham, England) is a singer and actor (using multiple voices and accents), and choir director. She immigrated to Australia in 1978. Their work includes, Under the influence which was a music theatre production in 2023.

== Work ==
Shortis and Simpson make music about Australian life both past and present. They perform as cabaret singers, creating new songs and shows as the political direction of the land changes.

=== Political Satire and Cabaret ===
In February 1991 Shortis and Simpson performed a cabaret and musical theatre production of The Bishop and the Actresses, which was written and directed by Shortis. Also appearing in the show at the Tilbury Hotel, Woolloomooloo, were Margret RoadKnight and Kerry Ella McAullay. This led to a series of performances at the School of Arts Café in Queanbeyan on invitation from producer Bill Stephens and sparked the development of Shortis and Simpson as a comedy cabaret act.

Shortis and Simpson develop shows to herald the annual release of cabinet papers from the National of Archives of Australia (ABC Interview). They also developed a show for the Enlighten Canberra Festival 2015.

Shortis and Simpson offer a regular series of political cabaret each year. Previous shows include Three Nights at the Bleeding Heart,Eleven Year Itch, The Howard Years, Political Animals, A Liberal Dose of Shortis and Simpson, On Our Election, The Singing Budget, Dismissed, A Well Hung Parliament and A Suppository of Wisdom.

For the Canberra Centenary in 2013 a collaboration between Australian playwright John Romeril and composer John Shortis developed Prime Time a show about the Prime Ministers of Australia.

World Music, especially Eastern European influence, is heard in their choirs and shows such as Good Evening Europe: The Untold story of Eurovision.

=== Choirs and community stories ===
They run a world music choir, "Worldly Goods", and develop community choirs in farther-flung regions of Australia, from the first Outback Children's Spectacular in 1988 to Bells of Peace at Mt Evelyn in Victoria for Anzac Day 2015.

Shortis and Simpson delivered an academic paper on musical influences, Georgian Folk Music Meets the Beatles, at the International Research Centre for Traditional Polyphony at Tbilisi, Georgia upon invitation by Joseph Jordania.

=== Awards ===
Cinderella Acappella, an album released in 1994 written by Shortis was nominated for the ARIA Award for Best Children's Album in 1995 but lost to The Wiggles' Big Red Car. Shortis and Simpson performed the album at the Sydney Opera House with Blair Greenberg, Jeannie Lewis, and Margret RoadKnight. Simpson's autobiographical show, Big Voice, was awarded the Canberra Critics Circle Award 2009. Shortis and Simpson were awarded another Canberra Critics Circle Award in 2010 for Tin Pan Aussie , a tale told in the music of a young nation forging a new federal political system, finding its identity in a world coping with the pressures of the Depression and two world wars, and grappling with its acceptance of its Indigenous people. Tin Pan Aussie was also performed in Lanark Scotland .

Year	Nominated works	Award	Result	Lost to	Ref
1995	Cinderella Acappella	Best Children's Album	Nominated	The Wiggles - Big Red Car	

== John Shortis ==
John Damien Shortis OAM was born in 1948. During the 1960s and 70s, Shortis was a freelance composer-writer with the Australian Broadcasting Commission. Some of his songs are sung on Play School and appear on the Play School albums by ABC Kids.

He chose songs, wrote scripts, and performed as musical director for Let's Have Music and Singing and Listening radio broadcasts which formed the basis for music programs in most schools across the nation for many years. [Shortis Interview at the National Library of Australia]

Shortis co-wrote a musical for primary schools based on Australian history called The Corrugated Violin Show, a creative music series with an accompanying book. He wrote music and lyrics, and arranged a collation of songs called Cinderella Acapella, (see earlier links under Awards as shortlisted for the Best Children's Album ARIA Award in 1995).

In 1988, Shortis was appointed artistic director of the first Outback Children's Spectacular – a bicentennial project involving 3,000 children from outback areas west of Dubbo and across to the South Australia and Queensland borders. As artistic director he wrote songs with the kids in song writing workshops, hired other performers, and brought children from 50 schools together to perform on a football field in Dubbo. The show was viewed by over 25,000 people on regional TV. The success of this project supported ongoing shows in various outback locations.

Shortis composes across many genres, including theatre productions for the Nimrod Theatre Company, Tasmanian Puppet Theatre, Patch Theatre Company, and Jigsaw Theatre Company. His songs are recorded by many artists including Franciscus Henri. Shortis has also written music for opera and composed for the Sydney Youth Orchestra. The Adelaide Symphony Orchestra performed his orchestral suite Bushlandia, played at the Festival Theatre in 1993 and commissioned by Come Out Festivals.

Shortis was awarded a Harold White Fellowship at the National Library of Australia in 1998 where he would research the library's sheet music collection. This resulted in the musical productions of Sheet Dip in 1998, giving voice to discoveries from the collection, and an exhibition in 2001, “Between the Sheets – The National Library’s Sheet Music Collection,” at the National Library of Australia as well as on tour in 2003/4 and in print.

A Fellowship with the Australian Prime Ministers' Centre at the Museum of Australian Democracy in 2008 enabled Shortis to research and compose a song about each of the Prime Ministers from federation to the present day. In 2013, this developed into the stage show, Prime Time, performed at the Q Theatre in Queanbeyan as part of the Centenary of Canberra.

Shortis was awarded the Medal of the Order of Australia in the 2017 Queen's Birthday Honours for "service to the performing arts as an entertainer."

== Moya Simpson ==
Moya Simpson OAM was born in 1948 in Twickenham, England and migrated to Australia in 1978. In February 1987, she was a member of Je Ne Sais Choir, along with Mara Kiek and Jarnie Birmingham. That choir backed Margret RoadKnight on her tour of Australia, supporting Frankie Armstrong. By October 1993 RoadKnight's backing group were renamed as Girls in Your Town and were touring Australia. According to The Canberra Times' Michael Foster, the a cappella quartet sang "songs of the '50s and '60s along with gospel, jazz, drinking, and barbershop songs and African chants." In April 1994, Simpson backed RoadKnight's solo performances with Shortis on piano.

In July 1994, Simpson told Graham McDonald of The Canberra Times that she had been working on Close Your Eyes and Think of England, a theatre show which highlights "English women singers who have at one time or another performed in Australia. It ranges from Marie Lloyd through Gracie Fields and Vera Lynn to Celia Black... [and] tries to get across the spirit of those women, combining songs and anecdotes rather than simply be an impersonation."

Simpson directs choirs, leads singing workshops for all ages and abilities, and performs solo as both a singer and actor.

In 1998, Moya Simpson established two choirs: the 50-to-70 strong community choir Worldly Goods and a smaller, specialized Balkan and Eastern European group, Can Belto. Simpson directs Worldly Goods performances at festivals, in large community arts projects, at national institutions, conferences, and official dinners and at their own concerts. In 2002, the choir was invited to represent the ACT at the Bendigo Gospel Music Festival. Subsequently, they performed a Beatles tribute, singing out the influence of Georgian harmonies, John, Paul, Ringo and Georgia, at the National Multicultural Festival in Canberra and at Hobart's Festival of Voices 2007.

In 2010, Simpson toured 40 choir members through South African villages with African singer and composer, Valanga Khoza, who invited the choir to sing in his own home village. Worldly Goods choir sang in many of Canberra's national institutions, including the High Court of Australia.

Simpson established Can Belto in 1998, a small a cappella group specializing in Eastern European singing, which can be heard on their CD and through performances in Emma Celebrazione at the Street Theatre, Canberra's Floriade, the Australian War Memorial, the National Gallery, the National Archives, the National Museum of Australia, and multiple Weereewa Festivals of Lake George. Further afield, the choir sang at la Boite in Melbourne in 2007 and the Sydney A Cappella Festival in 2008. Can Belto merged with the Worldly Goods choir in 2009.

Simpson has sung her way through hundreds of performances around Australia for over thirty years.

Her one-woman show in 1991 and 2001 called Close Your Eyes and Think of England was sung in the style and accents of Cilla Black, Marie Lloyd, Gracie Fields, Petula Clark, Sandie Shaw and Vera Lynn. This show also toured parts of Australia from 1995 to 2001. Another solo show was Yodel Lady at the Street Theatre Canberra in 2001. Simpson won the Canberra Critics Circle Award 2009 for her autobiographical cabaret, Big Voice, "in which she utilised an extraordinary array of musical and performance skills to create a genuinely moving and entertaining performance work."

Simpson acted the part of a corrupt and frisky male Russian bureaucrat in 2012 in Jim McGrath's adaptation of Heart of a Dog.

She acted in Catalogue of Dreams in 2013, an Urban Theatre production about experiences of foster care and homelessness with particular reference to Indigenous children.

Simpson was awarded the Medal of the Order of Australia in the 2017 Queen's Birthday Honours for "service to the performing arts as an entertainer".

In 2024 Shortis became the 2024 national folk fellow
