= The Newcastle Song =

Single by Bob Hudson

from the album The Newcastle Song
- B-side: "Ventriloquist Love"
- Released: 1974
- Label: M7 Records
- Songwriter(s): Bob Hudson
- Producer(s): Chris Neal

"The Newcastle Song" was a 1975 hit for musician and comedian Bob Hudson. It poked fun at the working-class youth culture of the city of Newcastle, New South Wales, Australia. The song was recorded in front of a live audience in 1974. It became a number-one single in both Australia and New Zealand.

At the 1975 Australian Record Awards, the song won Record of the Year.

== Charts ==
=== Weekly charts ===
Chart (1975)	Peak position
Australia (Kent Music Report)	1

=== Year-end charts ===
Chart (1975)	Peak position
Australia (Kent Music Report)	8

== Theme ==
The story-line concerns a young man called Norm who goes out with his mates looking to pick up women in Newcastle's main street, Hunter Street, in their "hot FJ Holden". They encounter a young lady and her Hells Angel date outside the "Parthenon Milk Bar". There is a verbal exchange between Norm and the Hells Angel before Norm slips away during a break in the traffic.

== Historical Inaccuracies ==
Disappointed tourists soon discovered that the Parthenon didn't exist on Hunter Street in 1974, Originally located in Pacific St, Newcastle East. It was a generic name used to cover all the Greek Milk Bars that were extremely popular in Newcastle at the time of the song. However, before long, an entrepreneur sensed an opportunity and the Parthenon Milk Bar opened for business in Hunter Street west, near the Cambridge Hotel. That Parthenon Milk Bar did become very popular with late night revellers in Newcastle and survived in Hunter Street west into the 1990s as a local business.

== In popular culture ==
In 1975 the singer Maureen Elkner (performing as "Maureen Elkner and Normie") released the single "Rak Off, Normie!" which told of the encounter from the young lady's point of view and her later life of regret with the Hells Angel after spurning Norm's advances.
