= Bob Hudson (singer) =

- Born: Robert Hudson; 15 October 1946 (age 79); Sydney, New South Wales, Australia
- Origin: Newcastle, New South Wales, Australia
- Genres: Comedy; folk; country; jazz
- Occupations: Singer, radio presenter, archaeologist
- Instruments: Vocals; guitar; ukulele
- Years active: 1968–1980
- Labels: M7; Larrikin

Robert Hudson (born 1946) is an Australian singer, radio presenter and archaeologist. His satirical narrative, "The Newcastle Song" (March 1975), topped the Kent Music Report singles chart. He also wrote and recorded, "Girls in Our Town", which was covered by Margret RoadKnight in January 1976 and Judy Small in 1982.

== Biography ==
Robert Hudson was born in Sydney in 1946 and grew up in Grafton. He attended Newcastle Teacher's College during the mid-1960s. He started working as a geography teacher but switched to psychiatric nursing and then general nursing. In the late 1960s he also began performing as a solo folk and comic singer. He was the lead singer in the Electric Jug Band, which played at the Star Hotel, Newcastle during the early 1970s – the site of the Star Hotel riot in September 1979.

Hudson had joined the Teen Angels by 1973 with Jean Lewis and Roy Ritchie, which performed "vintage rock'n'roll and doo wop songs." He was a member of a touring revue, Rock 'N' Roll Refugees, alongside, John J. Francis, Alan Luchetti, Margret Roadknight and Glenn Cardier. With fellow folk musician Graham Lowndes, he co-wrote music for plays presented by the Australian Free Theatre Group. Hudson described his musical influences as Chad Morgan, Phil Ochs and Jon Hendricks.

He teamed up with ABC musical director, record producer and songwriter Chris Neal to record an in-concert album, The Newcastle Song, in 1974. From August 1974 he was performing a concert-drama of the same name with "actors, Arthur Dignam and Jane Harders" and "jazz pianist Judy Bailey, brilliant young composer/guitarist Roy Ritchie,... rock and orchestral bass player Dave Ellis and singers Graham Lowndes, Starlee Ford and Bobbie Gledhill." The title track, "The Newcastle Song" (March 1975), was trimmed down from the ten-minute album version for the single, which topped the Australian Kent Music Report Singles Chart for four weeks.

Hudson, with Neal, co-wrote and recorded a response song, "Rak off Normie", which was covered by Maureen Elkner and became a top ten hit for her in mid-1975. At the Australian Radio Records Awards of October 1975 Hudson won Record of the Year for The Newcastle Song and the New Talent Encouragement award. Another album track, "Girls in Our Town", was a top 40 single for RoadKnight in January 1976.

Other albums by Hudson are After Me Cat Left Home (1975) and Party Pieces (1980). Hudson was one of the original on-air team at the Australian Broadcasting Corporation (ABC) rock radio station 2JJ (Double Jay, now Triple J) in 1975, and later presented Music Buffs' Talk Back Show, with Glenn A. Baker, on the ABC radio station 2BL. Hudson also worked on ABC radio's international news desk. In the 1980s he was involved in the publishing of a book about Australian language Hudson completed a PhD in archaeology at the University of Sydney and conducted research on ancient Myanmar (Burma).

== Discography ==
=== Albums ===
List of albums, with selected chart positions
Title	Album details	Peak chart positions
Title	Album details	AUS
Newcastle Song	Released: 1974; Format: LP; Label: M7 (MLF-083)	6
After Me Cat Left Home	Released: December 1975; Format: LP; Label: M7 (MLF-102)	-
Party Pieces	Released: 1980; Format: LP; Label: Larrikin Records (LRF-058)	-

=== Singles ===
List of singles, with selected chart positions
Year	Title	Peak chart positions	Album
Year	Title	AUS	Album
1974	"The Newcastle Song"	1	Newcastle Song
1975	"Waltzing Matilda Rock"	-	After Me Cat Left Home
1975	"After Me Cat Left Home"	-	After Me Cat Left Home
1977	"The Girls in Our Town" / "Who's Your Friend?"	-	Newcastle Song

==== Other singles ====
List of singles as featured artist, with selected chart positions
Title	Year	Peak chart positions
Title	Year	AUS
"The Garden" (as Australia Too)	1985	22

== Awards and nominations ==
=== Australian Record Awards ===
Year	Nominee / work	Award	Result
1975	Bob Hudson	New Talent Award	Won
1975	"The Newcastle Song”"	Record of the Year	Won
