= Jennie Ponsford =

Australian neuroscience researcher

Jennie Louise Ponsford AO is an Australian neuroscience researcher at Monash University, Victoria who works on Traumatic Brain Injury (TBI). Ponsford is a clinical neuropsychologist, whose work is focused on developing a deeper understanding of the negative consequences of TBI, particularly those related to fatigue, sleep disturbance, attentional, memory and executive problems, psychiatric and behavioural disturbances and sexuality, and the development of rehabilitation interventions to improve long term recovery and quality of life in individuals with TBI.

Ponsford is Director of the Monash-Epworth Rehabilitation Research Centre, the aim of which is to conduct research in trauma rehabilitation, with a view to reducing long-term disability. She is also a founding member of the Institute for Safety, Compensation and Recovery Research (established in 2009), a collaborative initiative of the Victorian WorkCover Authority, the Transport Accident Commission and Monash University, devoted to promoting research and best practice in injury prevention, rehabilitation and compensation. In partnership with the Department of Human Services, she has created information resources for adults and children with mild traumatic brain injury.

== Early life and education ==
Ponsford has a Bachelor of Arts, with honours in Psychology, a Masters in Clinical Neuropsychology and a PhD. She worked as a clinical neuropsychologist in Sydney before returning to Melbourne, taking up a position at the Epworth Hospital as Head of Psychology. She commenced work at Monash University in 1999. She established a doctoral program in neuropsychology at Monash University. In 2000 she commenced as Director of the Monash-Epworth Rehabilitation Research Centre.

== Work ==
Ponsford has spent the last 42 years working the field of traumatic brain injury. She currently co-ordinates one of the world's largest longitudinal outcome studies, which is tracking more than 3000 patients over 30 years following a traumatic brain injury. The Longitudinal Head Injury Outcome Project, has been running since 1995. The goal of the study is to document the long-term problems of people with TBI, identify factors that influence outcome, particularly the influence of age, genetic, cultural and behavioural factors. This study represents one of the largest TBI databases with long term follow up data from both patients and families.

She was a Chief Investigator on the National Health and Medical Research Council (NHMRC)-funded Centre of Research Excellence in Traumatic Brain Injury Psychosocial Rehabilitation, Moving Ahead. This Centre brought together researchers from within Australia and internationally to build research capacity in the area of TBI, drive new research and translate evidence into practice.

Ponsford has published widely in the field of TBI, writing over 25 book chapters addressing the consequences and management of TBI related disorders. In 2012 she was lead author on the book Traumatic Brain Injury Rehabilitation for everyday adaptive living. She has published over 500 scholarly articles on the topic.

== Awards and honors ==
Ponsford was awarded the Robert L. Moody Prize (2013) for Distinguished Initiatives in Brain Injury Research and Rehabilitation

In 2014 she was the Monash Postgraduate Association Supervisor of the Year

In 2015 she received the International Neuropsychological Society Paul Satz Career Mentoring Award

In 2017 she was Epworth Research Leader of the Year

In 2017 she was made an Officer of the Order of Australia (AO) for distinguished service to medical research in the field of neuropsychology, and through seminal advances in the diagnosis, treatment and rehabilitation of patients with traumatic brain injuries.

2018 Australian Psychological Society College of Clinical Neuropscyhologists Award of Distinction

She is currently the Dirk Bakker Visiting professor, University of Maastricht, The Netherlands and also holds a research appointment at the Sunnaas Rehabilitation Hospital in Oslo, Norway

In 2019 she received the Australian Psychological Society Rehabilitation Psychology Interest Group Research Award.

In both 2020, 2022 and 2023 she was ranked by The Australian as Australia's leading research scientist in Rehabilitation Therapy

In 2023 she received the International Brain Injury Association Jennett Plum Award for Outstanding Clinical Achievement in Brain Injury Medicine and the Australian Psychological Society Prize for Distinguished Contribution to Psychological Science.
