= Franciscus Henri discography =

- Studio albums: 23
- Compilation albums: 1
- Singles: 5
- Video albums: 7

The discography of Franciscus Henri, a Dutch-Australian folk, gospel and children's music performer, consists of 23 studio albums, 1 compilation album, 5 singles and 7 home video releases.

== Studio albums ==
Year	Title	Label	Awards
1972	Ding Dong Who Rang the Bell	Fable	
1972	Gabriel's Mother's Highway	Move	
1975	Pigtails	Crest	
1976	Lord of the Dance	Crest	
1981	Sunshine Rainbows and Violins	John Bye Productions	
1981	Children's Christmas Songs	John Bye Productions	
1985	Fifty Golden Nursery Rhymes	Fable	
1988	Tree House	ABC Kids	
1991	White Pyjamas	ABC Kids	
1991	Dancing in the Kitchen	ABC Kids	Nominated for Aria: Best Children's Album
1992	Walking on the Milky Way	ABC Kids	Nominated for Aria: Best Children's Album
1993	Merry Christmas	ABC Kids	
1993	My Favourite Nursery Rhymes	ABC Kids	Nominated for Aria: Best Children's Album
1994	Stories and Songs	ABC Kids	
1994	I'm Hans Christian Andersen	ABC Kids	Nominated for Aria: Best Children's Album
1997	Hello Mister Whiskers	ABC Kids	Nominated for Aria: Best Children's Album
1998	Hooray for Mister Whiskers	ABC Kids	Nominated for Aria: Best Children's Album
1998	Mister Whiskers: My Favourite Nursery Rhymes	ABC Kids	A re-release of My Favourite Nursery Rhymes
1999	Mister Whiskers: Monkey Business	ABC Kids	Nominated for Aria: Best Children's Album
1999	Board of Studies "Street Sense" – Road Safety Songs	ABC Kids	
2003	Explorer Semester One	Music Makers	
2004	Maestro Semester One	Music Makers	
2004	Explorer Semester Two	Music Makers	
2004	Maestro Semester Two	Music Makers	
2005	Nothing Fixed or Final	Franciscus Henri Productions	

== Compilations ==
Year	Title	Label
2002	The Best of Franciscus Henri	ABC Kids

== Singles ==
Year	Single	Chart Positions	Album	Label
Year	Single	AUS	Album	Label
1970	"Mary and Me"	-	Channel 9 'New Faces' Discoveries	Fable
1971	"All I Want"	72	Non-album single	Fable
1972	"Turn You Round"	-	Non-album single	Fable
1972	"Ding Dong Who Rang The Bell"	-	Ding Dong Who Rang The Bell	Fable
1990	"White Pyjamas"	-	White Pyjamas	ABC Kids

== Home Video ==
=== VHS ===
Year	Title
1992	OH NO! It's The Franciscus Henri Video
1994	I'm Hans Christian Andersen
1998	Hello Mister Whiskers!
2000	My Favourite Nursery Rhymes
2001	Sing a Song in Singapore

=== DVD ===
Year	Title
2008	The Franciscus Henri Collection
2008	The Mister Whiskers Collection
