= Moloi =

Moloi is a surname. Notable people with the surname include:

- Dirang Moloi (born 1985), Botswanan footballer
- Lerato Moloi, South African fashion model
- Mpho Moloi (born 1983), South African footballer
- Pontsho Moloi (born 1981), Botswanan footballer
- Precious Moloi-Motsepe, South African fashion entrepreneur and philanthropist
- Teboho Moloi (born 1968), South African footballer
- Thabo Moloi (born 1994), South African footballer
- Timothy Moloi (born 1975), South African singer
