= Kholokoe people =

South African ethnic group

The MaKholokoe are a subset of the Kgatla (Bakgatla ba Mmakau) and descend from Morena Khetsi, son of Morena Tabane. The Kholokoe people are historically found in the eastern Free State (Harrismith, Wetsieshoek, Vrede, Kestel, Deneysville, etc.), KwaZulu-Natal (in Nqutu), Mpumalanga (Daggakraal, Amersfoort), Greylingstad, Northwest, Gauteng and in Lesotho. They are the descendants of Bakgatla Chief Tabane and Princess Mathulare, daughter of the Bafokeng Chief.

Tabane fathered five sons: Diale, Kgetsi, Kgwadi (Motlôkwa), Matsiboho, and Mosia (in order of their birth). Each son broke away from the Bakgatla tribe to form their own group: Pedi (Bapedi), the Kholokoe, Batlôkwa, Maphuthing, and Basia, respectively.

The Kholokoe tribe has linguistic and cultural characteristics that distinguish them from other Bantu speakers of southern Africa. Their language shows a merger of South Sotho and Nguni languages. They also practice totemism (the Kholokoe tribe totem is the Duiker (Phuti), but some still hold on to the fowl, while others the porcupine), the preferential marriage of paternal cousins, and an architectural style characterized by a round hut with a conical thatch roof.

The senior house of the Kholokoe tribe is the house of Moduli/Molupi, son of Mokete. They are the Makholokoe a Letseba, which means "the secret that was known by Mokholoane, who died without revealing it." Tabane's first son from his senior wife, Matlaisane, remained with the Bakgatla ba Motšha group. After Tabane concurred with the Venda, he married a Venda wife and fathered a son called Vele.

== History ==
The Kholokoe tribe is a Bantu-speaking ethnic group in South Africa. They are descended from the Ba-Hurutshe clan, and their early ancestry can be traced back to Mokgatla, the founder of the Bakgatla tribe.

The Kholokoe tribe claims lineage from the Ba-Hurutshe clan, which was formed following the death of Morolong's 4th-generation great-grandson Malope of Masilo in the 14th century. The leadership crisis that resulted from Malope's death led to the formation of the Ba-Hurutshe and Ba-Kwena clans, upon the tribe got split between the daughter in the main house and the son Kwena in the 2nd house which resulted in followers of Mohurutshe called Bahurutshe and followers of Kwena as Bakwena, these are the children of Malope son of Masilo of Melore of Mhete. Malope from his father, Masilo, inherited the tribe as Baphofung confederation with Phofu as their totem only to split between his children being Mohurutshe and Kwena after his death.In their split later some Bahurutshe adopted Tshwene as new totem whereas others remain with Phofu while Bakwena discarded Phofu and adopted Kwena.

Around 1560, Kgetsi/Khetsi (Lekholokoe), son of Tabane, married Mabale and fathered Moloi. Moloi married Maleseha and fathered Hlabathe. Hlabathe fathered Sehoala/Sehoele. Sehoala married Malekoesa and fathered Tjale. Tjale fathered Tsholedi. Tsholedi married Malekunya and fathered Motsoane. Motsoane fathered Mokholoane. Mokholoane fathered Matsemela, who married Madiale and fathered the five known houses of Kholokoe: (Leubane, Lehasa, Maphale, Tsele, Motaoane) and Matsholedi.

Before the birth of Kgetsi/Khetsi, his father Tabane and other Bakgatla lived around "Thaba tsa Mohale," known today as Magaliesberg. During the 1600s, Kgetsi/Khetsi took his group and moved eastward and north of Lekoa (Vaal), settling near Seratoe, today Standerton, at a mountain that, since their occupation, became Thaba Kholokoe. This is where the Kholokoe tribe lived for over 200 years, about eight to nine generations, until the attacks of Matiwane in 1822 and Mzilikazi in 1823. It is considered the birthplace of the Kholokoe tribe.

Some of the Kholokoe tribe kings or chiefs that lived in Thaba Kholokoe were: Kgetsi Moloi, Hlabate, Sehoaba/Sehoele, Tyale, Tsholedi, Motsoane, Mokholoane, and Matsemela.

From Thaba Kholokoe, the Kholokoe tribe spread to many areas around the Free State and Natal. One group under the leadership of Morena Wetsi (Oetsi) went to Natal Nqutu and settled in today's Wetsieshoek, where many of the Kholokoe were killed inside a cave during a war against the Boers. The other group went with Tsuisi to Harrismith, another to Thaba-Kholo in Bethlehem, another group under Popo son of Wetsi (Oetsi) settled in Daggakraal, while the other broke into a clan called Makgolokwe-a-Mafehleng under Sebobane son of Selotolotsa of Polane went to Tebang, Tshenyane, Lekoa, then Limpopo, and the North West.

== Land ==
Although one would love to hear the anecdotal side of the Kholokoe Tribe history, it is unfortunately heavily clouded by the ever-present and festering issue of land and property dispossession and subsequent brutal oppression and painful suffering of the Kholokoe Tribe, first from the Dutch ―Boer‖ Government (Volksraad) of the Free State, and subsequently from the British Orange River Colony Administration and even in the modern times, especially under the Bantustan (Native Homelands) system of the nineteen seventy's and the nineteen eighty's, during which period people like the late Qwaqwa Homeland Prime Minister T.K.Mopeli, ruthlessly sought to and nearly achieved destroying the Kholokoe Tribe! Much of the history written today states that Qwaqwa, formerly known as Wetzieshoek was the residence of only two Basotho tribes, Bakoena and Batlokoa, completely ignoring the presence of the Kholokoe tribe.

Like many other tribes, the kholokoe tribe was dispossessed of their land, leading to their traditional leaders, the Batlokoa traditional leaders, and the then secretary of the kholokoe traditional council, JT Gumede, going to England in 1906 to protest the kholokoes and Batlokoa losing their ancestral land to the former Boer republics.

As early as 1837, the Kholokoe tribe was already resident in the northern Free State around the Maluti region, Northern Natal around the Klip River region, and the Vaal River region, notably in the areas of the Witsieshoek district and the Harrismith district. In 1856, the Kholokoe tribe, under Morena Wetsi, was forcefully dispossessed of this part of their territory by the Free State Dutch Government, on wholly unjustifiable pretenses, only two years after the Convention of Bloemfontein of 1854.

In 1866 Commandant C. de Villiers, also popularly known as Masoothonyane, who was then in charge of the Thaba Nchu, i.e., Harrismith district, and a member of the Volksraad, requested the tribes to assist the Free State Government in the war against Moshoeshoe. They rendered military service as the Free Burgher Natives, and their armed contingents were known as the Witlaps and the Ringhals. The services were rendered firstly in consideration to secure and confirming the Tribes in free possession of the lands they then occupied, and secondly, after the successful conclusion of that war in 1868, for the payment of 9450 head of cattle to Commandant De Villiers acting for his Government, he agreed to the enlargement of the lands occupied by the Tribes. He, De Villiers, actually promised them that the land, approximately 2130 square miles (551 667 hectares), which the tribes were already occupying, would be secured for them. This is war talk since, in a way, he was indirectly saying that this land that they were occupying could at any time be expropriated, if need be, by forceful declaration and action. This is still one of the case studies about land dispossession even today, as seen in the book called The land is ours

At least up to and according to the guarantees of the Proclamation of 1848, no land occupied by these Tribes had been encroached upon by any Europeans, so De Villiers appeared to be acting in good faith based on that Proclamation. After the conclusion of the war in 1868, for the payment of 9450 cattle, it was agreed that all the land occupied mainly by two tribes, the BaTlokoa and the Kholokoe, who assisted Commandant De Villiers and the Boers in the war against Moshoeshoe, would then be given to them, after it had also been enlarged. There were three payments made for the purchase of three different areas of land: 2450 cattle paid for the Halspruit area, made by the BaTlokoa tribe; 4000 cattle paid for the Kliprivier area, the land situated in the Vrede and Harrismith Districts, also made by the BaTlokoa tribe; and 3000 cattle paid for the Mill River Valley in the Harrismith district, made by the Kholokoe tribe. The payments for the land of the Ba-Tlokoa tribe were made by Morena Lesisa Tsotetsi, who was representing the heirs of Morena Letika and Morena Lesala, both of whom were the late Marena (Chiefs) of the Ba-Tlokoa tribe. He paid a combined 7,000 cattle for both the Halspruit and Klip Rivier areas, which were largely occupied by the Ba-Tlokoa tribe. The Halspruit area was home to the Ba-Tlokoa tribe under the late Morena Lesala, and the Klip Rivier area was under the late Morena Letika, both of whom were now represented by Morena Lesisa. The payment for the Mill River Valley land, which covered both Thabantsu and Witsieshoek districts of the Kholokoe Tribe, was made by Morena Letlatsa Moloi, who was representing the heirs of the Late Morena Hlomise, son of the late Morena Oetsi (Witsie) of the Kholokoe Tribe. However, in 1888, the Kholokoe Tribe, after having received notice to leave the land, was forcibly evicted without any compensation. The struggle to regain their land had begun.

Chief Letlatsa Moloi of the Kholokoe Tribe became a thorn in the flesh for Captain John Quayle Dickson, the Advisor for Native Affairs in the British Colonial Orange Free State government. On the 5th of September 1903, Captain John Quayle Dickson wrote to Sir Harry Smith from his office in Bloemfontein indicating that he had visited Thabantsu, where he and the Regional Magistrate of the Thaba Nchu territory had personally met and informed Paramount Chief Letlasa of the Kholokoe Tribe that from then onwards he would be granted no special privileges whatsoever and that he was now stripped of his position as one of the well-known and respected Morena oa Kholokoe, declaring him to be just another native and therefore, in his opinion, Paramount Chief Letlatsa will give no further trouble. Yet more trouble from the cheated and dispossessed tribes was coming! The boundaries of these areas were well defined, as verified at the inquiry held in Harrismith by Captain John Quayle Dickson, Advisor for Native Affairs, and Magistrate Leary, as reported in Captain Dickson's letter of 23 June 1906. Mr. F. Van Reenen also testified to the fact that Commander De Villiers had cheated these native Chiefs in dealing with them, and when this was brought to the knowledge of the Free State government, it forced his resignation from the Volksraad.

== Battles fought by Makholokoe ==
Some of the history states that the Makholokoe were not great warriors, but according to the battles fought, won, and lost, the Kholokoes were as good warriors as any other tribe that lived in that era. Many Battles were fought at Thaba Kholokoe, and Mzilikazi attacked the Kholokoes a number of times.

In 1821, the battle between (Mahlapo) of Chief Mofeli and the Kholokoes under Chief Polane saw Polane and his Son Selotolotsa Killed, along with many others, and their cattle taken.

In 1856/7, the battle of the Kholokoes under Chief Wetsi/Oetsi and the Boers saw many of the Kholokoes killed in the cave while Wetsi (Oetsi) managed to escape to Lesotho.

== Genealogical tree of the kholokoe tribe ==
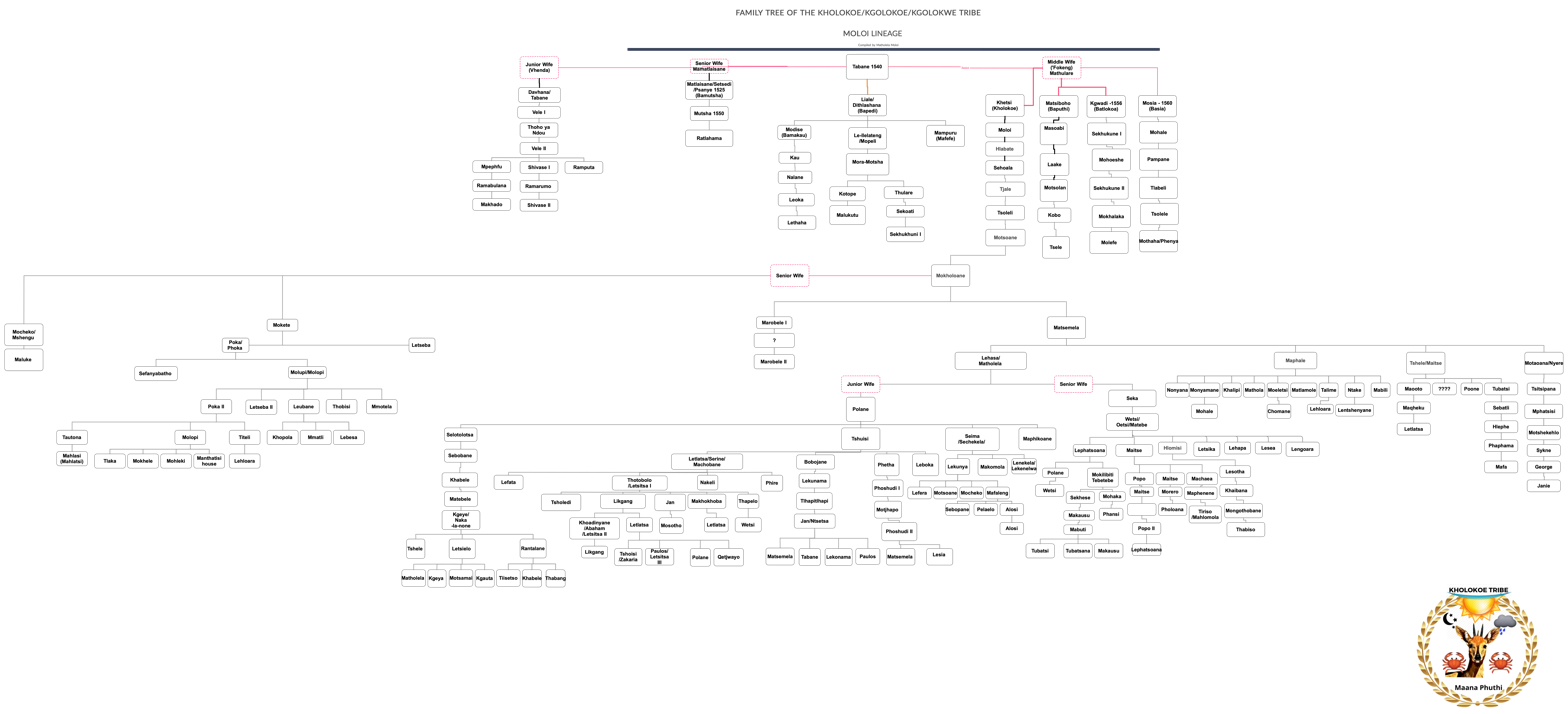
Family Tree of Kholokoe/Kgolokoe/Kgolokwe Tribe

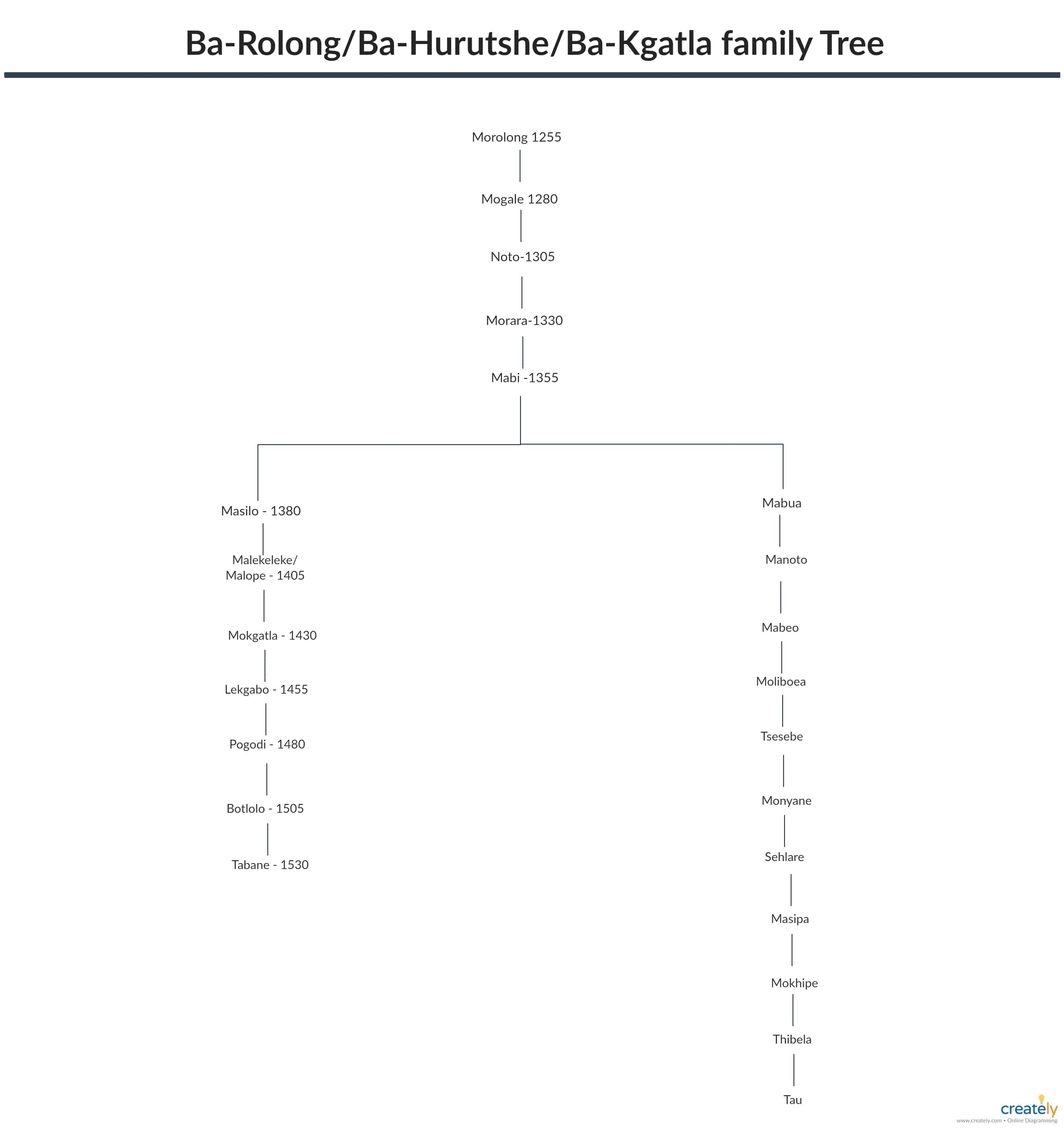
Genealogy of Bakgatla from Morolong

== Notable Kholokoe ==
- Precious Moloi-Motsepe is a medical doctor, entrepreneur and wife of billionaire Patrice Motsepe
- Malik Mogale, Water Industry
- Teboho Moloi a former soccer star
- Timothy Moloi, singer
- Lerato Moloi, media personality
- Onicca Moloi, politician
- Thabo Moloi, soccer player
- General Lambert Lehlohonolo Moloi is a South African military commander and a former commander of the African National Congress's military

== See also ==
- Sotho-Tswana peoples
