= Penitent thief =

Thief pardoned by Jesus on the cross

Saint Dismas
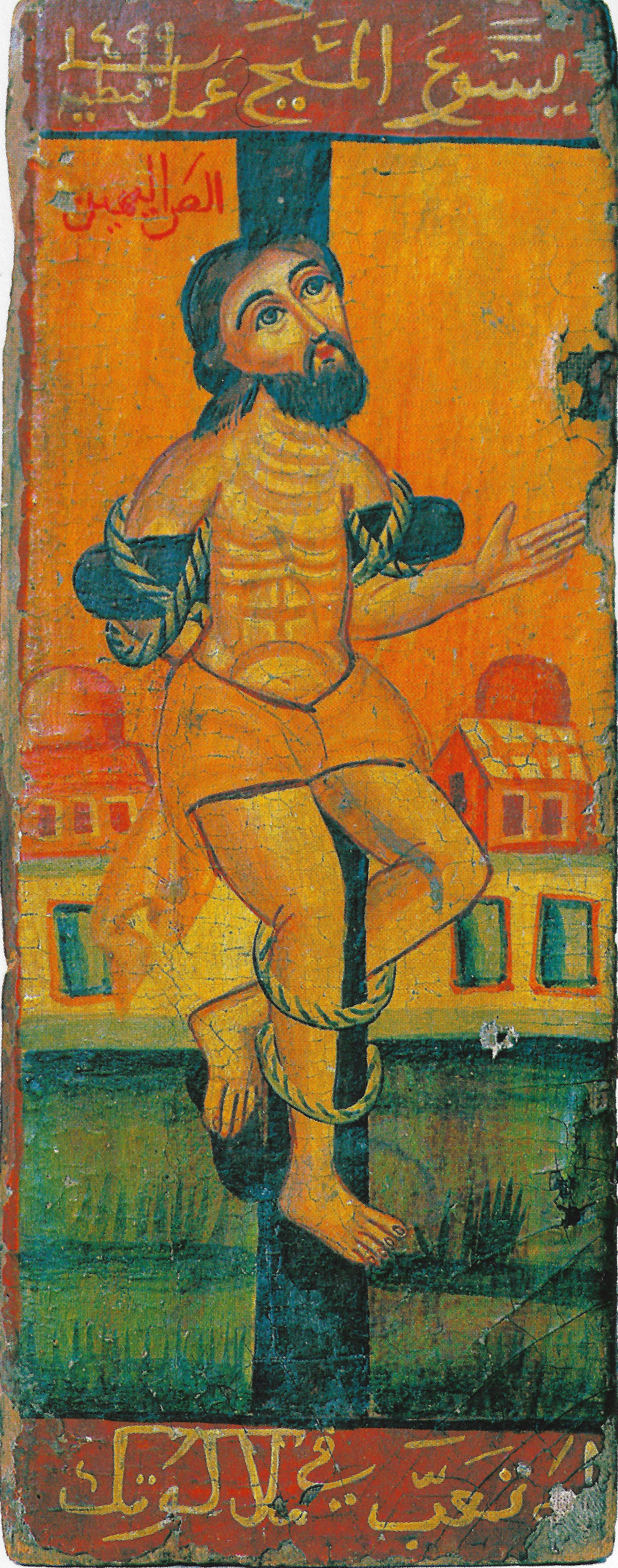
- 15th-century Arab Christian icon of Saint Dismas from the Berlin State Museum, reading "Jesus, remember me when you come into your kingdom".

The Penitent Thief
- Born: Galilee, Herodian Kingdom of Judea, Roman Empire
- Died: c. 30–33 AD; Golgotha Hill outside Jerusalem, Judea, Roman Empire
- Cause of death: Crucifixion
- Venerated in: Eastern Orthodox Church; Catholic Church; Oriental Orthodox Church
- Canonized: Pre-Congregation
- Major shrine: Chapel of Saint Helena, Church of the Holy Sepulchre, Jerusalem
- Feast: 25 March (Roman Catholic), 26 March (Poland); Good Friday (Eastern Orthodox)
- Attributes: Wearing a loincloth and either holding his cross or being crucified; sometimes depicted in Paradise
- Patronage: Prisoners (especially condemned); Funeral directors Repentant thieves Merizo, Guam; San Dimas, Mexico; Church of St. Dismas, the Good Thief, United States

The penitent thief, also known as the good thief, wise thief, grateful thief, or thief on the cross, is one of two unnamed thieves in Luke the Evangelist's account of the crucifixion of Jesus in the New Testament. The Gospel of Luke describes him asking Jesus to "remember him" when Jesus comes into his kingdom. The other, as the impenitent thief, challenges Jesus to save himself and both of them to prove that he is the Messiah.

Later Christian tradition named him Dismas, and he is venerated as a saint in the Eastern Orthodox Church, Catholic Church and Oriental Orthodox Church. The Roman Martyrology places his commemoration on 25 March, together with the Feast of the Annunciation, because of the ancient Christian tradition that Christ (and the penitent thief) were crucified and died exactly on the anniversary of Christ's incarnation.

== Name ==
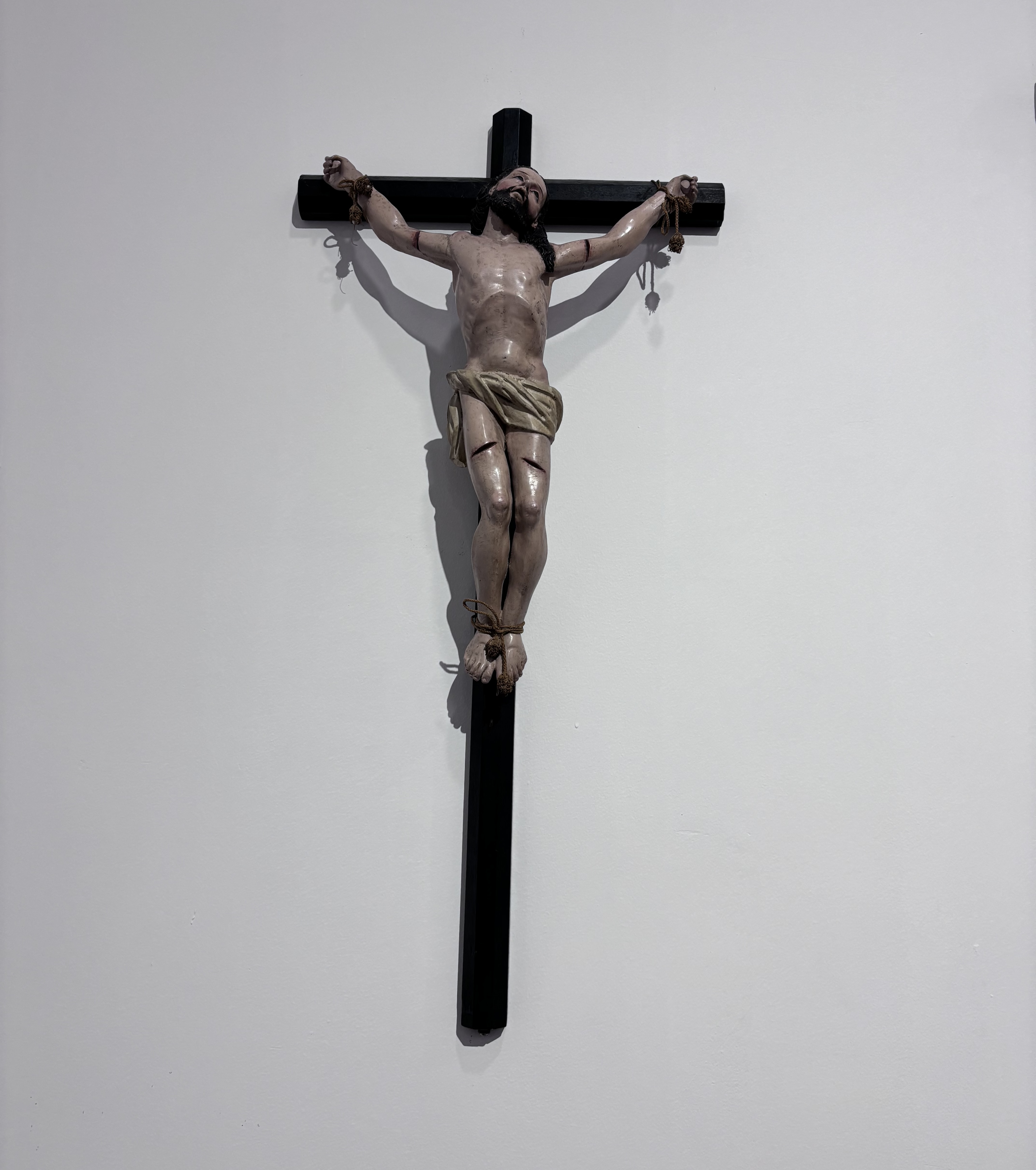
Penitent Thief (anonymous, 18th century), Santo Domingo Convent, Quito

The penitent thief is unnamed in the canonical gospels. The name Dismas was assigned later, in an early Greek recension of the Acta Pilati and the Latin Gospel of Nicodemus, portions of which may date to the late fourth century; it may derive from a Greek word meaning "dying". He is traditionally known in Catholicism as Saint Dismas (sometimes Dysmas; in Spanish and Portuguese, Dimas), while the other thief is named Gestas. Other traditions give other names:

- In Coptic Orthodox tradition and the Narrative of Joseph of Arimathea, he is named Demas.
- In the Codex Colbertinus, he is named Zoatham or Zoathan.
- In the Arabic Infancy Gospel, he is named Titus and the other thief Dumachus; it adds a tale in which Titus prevented his companions from robbing Mary and Joseph during the flight into Egypt.
- In Russian Orthodox tradition, he is named Rakh (Russian: Рах).

Legendary elaborations grew around the figure. The devotional Life of the Good Thief (Histoire du Bon Larron, French 1868, English 1882) recounts that as a child he addressed the child Jesus: "O most blessed of children, if ever a time should come when I shall crave Thy Mercy, remember me and forget not what has passed this day." Anne Catherine Emmerich described the Holy Family as "exhausted and helpless" when, according to Augustine of Hippo and Peter Damian, they met Dismas. A Coptic Homily on the Crucifixion and the Good Thief is traditionally attributed to Theophilus of Alexandria (385–412), though scholarship regards it as pseudonymous; it survives in Sahidic Coptic.

== Gospels ==
=== Narratives ===
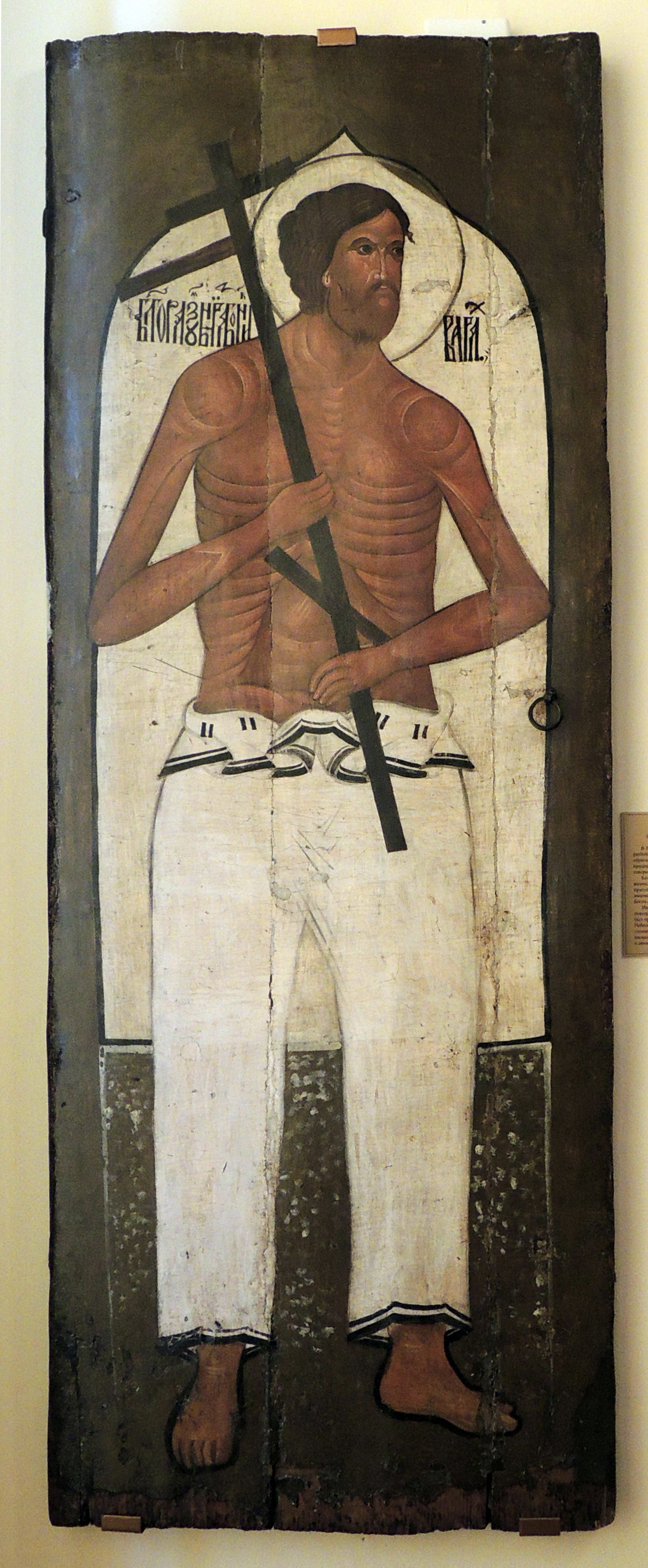
Russian icon of the good thief in paradise, c. 16th century in Rostov Kremlin

Two men were crucified at the same time as Jesus, one on his right and one on his left, which the Gospel of Mark interprets as fulfillment of the prophecy of Isaiah 53:12 ("And he was numbered with the transgressors"). According to the Gospels of Matthew and Mark, both of the thieves mocked Jesus; Luke 23, however, relates:

^{39} Now one of the criminals hanging there reviled Jesus, saying, "Are you not the Messiah? Save yourself and us."

^{40} The other, however, rebuking him, said in reply, "Have you no fear of God, for you are subject to the same condemnation? ^{41} And indeed, we have been condemned justly, for the sentence we received corresponds to our crimes, but this man has done nothing criminal." ^{42} Then he said, "Jesus, remember me, when you come into your kingdom."

^{43} He replied to him, "Amen, I say to you, today you will be with me in Paradise."

The Gospel of John mentions the two without naming them or their crimes, calling them simply "two others".

=== Harmonizations ===
Various attempts have been made to reconcile the apparent contradiction between the account in Luke and the overlapping account in Mark and Matthew. Tatian omitted/rejected the Markan/Matthean tradition in his Diatessaron, and Ephrem the Syrian apparently followed suit. Origen of Alexandria, Eustathius of Antioch, and Epiphanius of Salamis described the differences as reflections of different, yet complementary authorial intent. Origen and his many heirs promoted a chronological harmonization, wherein both thieves at first reviled Jesus, only for one thief to repent on the spot. Epiphanius, followed by Ambrose of Milan and Augustine of Hippo, contended that Mark and Matthew, for the sake of concision, employed a figure of speech called syllepsis whereby the plural was used to indicate the singular. Later commentators, such as Frederic Farrar, have drawn attention to the difference between the Greek words used: "The two first Synoptists tell us that both the robbers during an early part of the hours of crucifixion reproached Jesus (ὠνείδιζον), but we learn from St Luke that only one of them used injurious and insulting language to Him (ἐβλασφήμει)."

=== "Amen ... today ... in paradise" ===
The phrase translated "Amen, I say to you, today you will be in paradise" in Luke 23:43 ("Ἀμήν σοι λέγω σήμερον μετ' ἐμοῦ ἔσῃ ἐν τῷ παραδείσῳ." Amén soi légo sémeron met' emoû ése en tôi paradeísoi) is disputed in a minority of versions and commentaries. The Greek manuscripts are without punctuation, so attribution of the adverb "today" to the verb "be", as "Amen I say to you, today you will be with me in paradise" (the majority view), or the verb "say", as "Amen I say to you today, you will be with me in paradise" (the minority view), is dependent on analysis of word order conventions in Koine Greek. The majority of ancient Bible translations also follow the majority view, with only the Aramaic language Curetonian Gospels offering significant testimony to the minority view. As a result, some prayers recognize the good thief as the only person confirmed as a saint (that is, a person known to be in Paradise after death) by the Bible, and by Jesus himself. Thomas Aquinas wrote:

The words of The Lord (This day ... in paradise) must therefore be understood not of an earthly or corporeal paradise, but of that spiritual paradise in which all may be said to be, who are in the enjoyment of the divine glory. Hence to place, the thief went up with Christ to heaven, that he might be with Christ, as it was said to him: "Thou shalt be with Me in Paradise"; but as to reward, he was in Paradise, for he there tasted and enjoyed the divinity of Christ, together with the other saints.

=== Unnamed ===
Only the Gospel of Luke describes one of the criminals as penitent, and that gospel does not name him.

Augustine of Hippo does not name the thief, but wonders if he might not have been baptized at some point. In On Baptism, Against the Donatists, Augustine took up Cyprian's argument from the thief, who was promised paradise though unbaptized, to distinguish "the sacrament of baptism" from "the conversion of the heart", which he held could suffice for salvation when baptism was impossible. In late medieval preaching the good thief became a stock example of conversion in extremis, cited in debates over the salvation of those who repent only at the point of death.

According to tradition, the good thief was crucified to Jesus's right and the other thief was crucified to his left. For this reason, depictions of the crucifixion of Jesus often show Jesus's head inclined to his right, showing his acceptance of the good thief. In the Russian Orthodox Church, both crucifixes and crosses are usually made with three bars: the top one, representing the titulus (the inscription that Pontius Pilate wrote and was nailed above Jesus' head); the longer crossbar on which Jesus' hands were nailed; and a slanted bar at the bottom representing the footrest to which Jesus' feet were nailed. The footrest is slanted, pointing up towards the good thief, and pointing down towards the other.

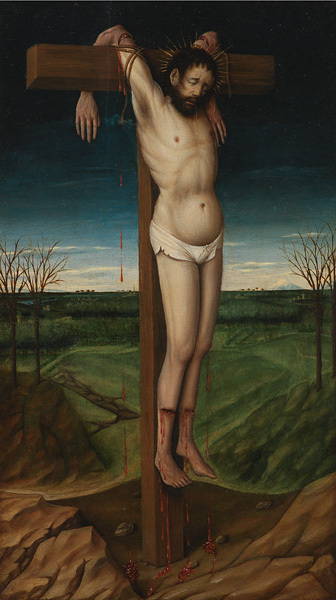
Painting from c. 1450

=== Thief or revolutionary ===
According to the United States Conference of Catholic Bishops commentary on John 18:40, the term commonly translated as thief – léstés – can also mean "a guerrilla warrior fighting for nationalistic aims".

== Sainthood ==
The Catholic Church remembers the Good Thief on 25 March. In the Roman Martyrology, the following entry is given: "Commemoration of the holy thief in Jerusalem who confessed Christ on the cross and was canonized by Jesus himself at that moment, and merited to hear from him: 'Today you will be with me in Paradise.'" A number of towns, including San Dimas, California, are named after him. Also, parish churches are named after him, such as the Church of the Good Thief in Kingston, Ontario, Canada (built by convicts at nearby Kingston Penitentiary), Saint Dismas Church in Waukegan, Illinois, the Old Catholic Parish of St Dismas in Coseley and the Church of St. Dismas, the Good Thief, a Catholic church at the Clinton Correctional Facility in Dannemora, New York.

The Eastern Orthodox Church remembers him on Good Friday, along with the crucifixion. The Synaxarion offers this couplet in his honor:

Eden's locked gates the Thief has opened wide,
By putting in the key, "Remember me."

== Prayer and music ==
He is commemorated in a traditional Eastern Orthodox prayer (the troparion tou deipnou) said before receiving the Eucharist: "I will not speak of Thy Mystery to Thine enemies, neither like Judas will I give Thee a kiss; but like the thief will I confess Thee: Remember me, O Lord in Thy Kingdom." According to the liturgical scholar Robert Taft, this hymn was inserted into the Holy Thursday liturgy in Constantinople in the late 6th century. In the Eastern Orthodox Church, one of the hymns of Good Friday is entitled, "The Good Thief" (or "The Wise Thief", Church Slavonic: "Razboinika blagorazumnago"), and speaks of how Christ granted Dismas Paradise. Several compositions of this hymn are sung at the Matins service on Good Friday in the Russian Orthodox Church.

== Art ==
The earliest depiction of the thief may be the wooden relief of the doors of Saint Sabine in Rome. Here the good thief is apparently located to the right side of Jesus, similar to the famous late sixth-century depiction of the crucifixion in the Rabbula Gospels.

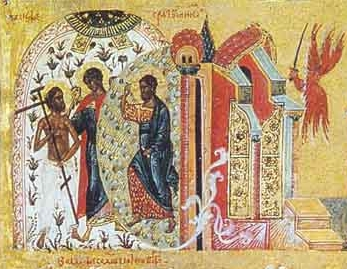
An icon showing Christ (center) bringing Dismas (left) into Paradise: At the right are the Gates of Paradise, guarded by a seraph (Solovetsky Monastery, 17th century).

In medieval art, St Dismas is often depicted as accompanying Jesus in the Harrowing of Hell as related in 1 Peter 3:19–20 and the Apostles' Creed (though neither text mentions the thief). Books on the good thief in art include monographs by Mitchell Merback (The Thief, the Cross, and the Wheel), Mikeal Parsons and Heidi Hornik (Illuminating Luke, vol. 3), and Christiane Klapisch-Zuber (Le voleur de paradis).

== Drama ==
In Samuel Beckett's Waiting for Godot, the main characters Vladimir and Estragon briefly discuss the inconsistencies between the Four Evangelists' accounts of the penitent and impenitent thieves. Vladimir concludes that since only Luke says that one of the two was saved, "then the two of them must have been damned [...] why believe him rather than the others?"

== Missionary work ==
Dismas Ministry, a national Catholic prison outreach founded in 2000, distributes scripture and religious materials to incarcerated people and prison chaplains across all 50 US states.

== Anne Catherine Emmerich's visions ==
According to the visions attributed to Anne Catherine Emmerich, the Holy Family encountered a group of robbers while travelling toward Egypt. The robbers initially intended to attack them, but Emmerich described a ray striking the heart of their leader when he saw the infant Jesus, after which he ordered his men not to harm the family.

The robbers subsequently took the family to their dwelling. There, Emmerich described a child belonging to the robbers' family who was suffering from leprosy. According to her account, Mary instructed that the water used to wash the infant Jesus be used to wash the child, after which the child was miraculously cured.

The Holy Family then continued their journey. Emmerich described the robber and his wife providing them with provisions and assisting them on their journey. As they departed, the robber said with deep emotion, "Remember us wherever you go."

Immediately, in a vision of the crucifixion, Emmerich identified the child who had been cured with the penitent thief traditionally known as Dismas. She connected the robber's earlier request to be remembered with the thief's words to Jesus at the crucifixion: "Lord, remember me when thou shalt come into thy kingdom."

== In popular culture ==
=== Literature ===
In Poul Anderson's Technic History, the trader Nicholas van Rijn makes a show of revering Saint Dismas.

Dismas Hardy is the main protagonist in a series of legal and crime thriller novels by John Lescroart.

=== Music ===
The thief features in Christian popular music, as in Christian rock band Third Day's 1995 song "Thief", and the name of the Christian rock band Dizmas. The thief is the narrator in Sydney Carter's controversial song "Friday Morning".

In "Vida Loka, Pt. 2", the Brazilian rap group Racionais MC's, refer to Dismas as a "first thug life of all time".

The rapper Ka's final album prior to his death was titled The Thief Next to Jesus.

=== Film ===
Dismas is prominently mentioned throughout the 1946 film The Hoodlum Saint starring William Powell, Esther Williams and Angela Lansbury.

In the 1967 romantic comedy caper film Fitzwilly, butler mastermind Claude Fitzwilliam (Dick Van Dyke) and his larcenous staff operate St. Dismas Thrift Shoppe in Philadelphia, a fictional charity where they send and store their stolen loot.

San Dimas, California and San Dimas High School are featured in the Bill & Ted media franchise.

He is portrayed by Stelio Savante in the Good Friday film Once We Were Slaves, directed by Dallas Jenkins.

In the 2022 film Clerks III, Elias mentions the Good Thief multiple times, quoting him as saying "Jesus did no wrong, whereas we are but thieves". In a running gag, everybody hears "but thieves" as "butt thieves" and wonders out loud what that means.

In "American Me" Edward James Olmos' character is given a medal of St. Dimas by his characters mother in a jail scene.

=== Games ===
Saint Dismas acts as the inspiration for the Highwayman character in Darkest Dungeon and its sequel Darkest Dungeon II. The primary inspiration for this character comes from the title "Penitent Thief" that was given to Saint Dismas.

Saint Dismas also appears in the Naughty Dog game Uncharted 4: A Thief's End, as a major story point for protagonist Nathan Drake to travel to his cathedral in Scotland.

== See also ==
- Impenitent thief – Gestas, the other thief crucified alongside Jesus
- Life of Jesus in the New Testament
- Passion (Christianity)
- List of names for the biblical nameless
- Saint Dismas, patron saint archive
