= Treehouse (disambiguation) =

A treehouse, tree house, or treefort is a habitable structure built in trees.

Treehouse may also refer to:

== Structures ==
- Tree House, Crawley, a listed 14th-century building in Crawley, West Sussex, United Kingdom; originally the manor house
- The Tree House, a 21-story student residence at Massachusetts College of Art and Design

== Entertainment ==
=== Music ===
- Treehouse (The Grapes of Wrath album), 1987
- Tree House (Franciscus Henri album), 1987
- Treehouse (I See Stars album), 2016
- Treehouse (Sofi Tukker album), 2018
- "Treehouse" (song), a 2019 song by James Arthur and Ty Dolla Sign featuring Shotty Horroh
- Treehouse, a 2011 single by Alex G and Emily Yacina

=== Film and television ===
- Treehouse (film), 2014 released horror film
- Treehouse TV, a Canadian preschool television station owned by YTV (Corus Entertainment)
- "Treehouse" (Into the Dark), an episode of the first season of Into the Dark
- "Treehouse" (Modern Family) an episode of the American sitcom Modern Family
- "Tree House" an episode of the Nickelodeon sitcom Drake & Josh

== Other ==
- The Treehouse (video game), an educational game by Brøderbund Software
- Treehouse (company), a for-profit education company
- TreeHouse School, a special school in London, United Kingdom that specialises in educating children and young people with autism
- Tree House Brewing Company, a brewery in Charlton, Massachusetts
- TreeHouse Foods, food processing company
- Treehouse (game), a boardgame using Icehouse pieces
- "Treehouse", a hackers' paradise from the book Otherland: City of Golden Shadow by Tad Williams

== See also ==
- Treehouse of Horror, the annual Halloween special on the television series The Simpsons
- Creepy treehouse, a social media term
- Magic Tree House, series of children's books by Mary Pope Osbourne
- Magic Tree House (film) anime film based on the children's books
