= Teboho =

Teboho is a masculine given name.

== List of people with the given name ==
- Teboho Loate, South African politician
- Teboho MacDonald Mashinini (1957–1990), South African anti Apartheid activist
- Teboho Mathibeli (born 1970), Lesotho boxer
- Teboho Mokgalagadi, South African Paralympian
- Teboho Mokoena (various people)
- Teboho Mohoje (born 1990), South African rugby union player
- Teboho Moloi (born 1968), retired South African professional footballer
