= Walking on the Milky Way =

Walking on the Milky Way can refer to:

- Walking on the Milky Way (album), album by Franciscus Henri
- Walking on the Milky Way (song), song by Orchestral Manoeuvres in the Dark (OMD)
