= Lerato =

Lerato is of Sotho-Tswana origin, stemming from the verb "rata," meaning "to love". Notable people with the name include:

- Lerato Chabangu (born 1985), South African footballer
- Lerato Kganyago (born 1982), South African actress and model
- Lerato Kgoatle (born 1993), South African cricketer
- Lerato Lamola (born 1986), South African footballer
- Lerato Makua (born 1999), South African rugby player
- Lerato Manzini (born 1991), South African footballer
- Lerato Mbele, South African journalist and broadcaster
- Lerato Moipone Molapo (born 1979), South African singer known as Lira (singer)
- Lerato Moloi, South African model
- Lerato Nxumalo (born 1999), South African actress and influencer
- Lerato Sechele (born 1994), Lesotho triple jumper
- Lerato Walaza, South African actress
