= List of Sotho-Tswana clans =

The Sotho-Tswana peoples are a meta-ethnicity of southern Africa and live predominantly in Botswana, South Africa and Lesotho.

== List of clans and kingdoms ==
Clan	Language	Country	Totem	Totem in English	Region
Bakgalagadi-Batlhaping	Setswana	Botswana	Thlapi	Fish	Batlhaping Kurumane South Africa
Babirwa	Setswana	Botswana	Nare	Buffalo	
Batabe	Setswana	Botswana	Tshipi	Iron	
Bafokeng	Sesotho, Setswana	Lesotho, South Africa	Mutla, Koena, Phoka	Hare, Crocodile, Dew	North West, Free State
Bafula	Sesotho	Lesotho, South Africa	Kolobe	Wild Hog	Free State
Bagananwa/Bahananwa	Sesotho sa Leboa	South Africa	Tshwene	Baboon	Bahurutshe, Limpopo
Bahlakoana	Sesotho	Lesotho, South Africa	Free State, Koena, families descending from Disema and Molapo, second and third born sons of Napo a Koena.	Crocodile	Bakoena
Bahurutshe	Setswana	Botswana, South Africa	Tshwene	Baboon	North West
Bakgaga/ Bakone	Sesotho sa Lebowa	South Africa	Kwena, Phuti, Kgaga	Crocodile, Duiker	Limpopo
Bakgalagadi	Setswana	Botswana			
Bakgalagadi – Baboalongwe	Setswana	Botswana	Nare	Buffalo	
Bakgalagadi – Bangologa	Setswana	Botswana, Namibia			
Bakgalagadi – Baphaleng	Setswana	Botswana			
Bakgalagadi – Bashaga	Setswana	Botswana		Bakgalagadi – Batlhaping Setswana Botswana South Africa Taung Tlhapi	
Bakhatla/ Bakgatla	Sesotho, Setswana	Lesotho, Botswana, South Africa	Kgabo, Eagle	Monkey	Bahurutshe
Bakhurutshe	Setswana	Botswana	Tshwene/Phofu	Baboon/Elands	Bahurutshe
Bakone	Sesotho sa Leboa	South Africa Limpopo	Hlagahlagane (Tlhantlhagane), Phuti	Guineafowl, Scaly feathered finch	
Bakubung	Setswana		Kubu	Hippopotamus	Barolong
Bakoena	Sesotho, Setswana		Koena	Crocodile	
Bamalete	Setswana	Botswana	Nare	Buffalo	
Banareng	Sesotho, Setswana	Botswana	Nare	Buffalo	Bahurutse,
Bangwaketse	Setswana	Botswana	Kwena	Crocodile	Bakwena
Bangwato	Setswana	Botswana	Phuti	Duiker	Bakwena
Bapai	Sesotho ba Leboa/ Sepulane	South Africa Limpopo/ Mpumalanga	Tswhene	Baboon	Sepulane, Swazi
Bapedi	Sepedi	South Africa/Botswana	Noko, tlou, tau, phuti, kwena, chuene, phiri	Porcupine, elegant, lion, duiker, crocodile, baboon, wolf	limpopo, mpumalanga, Gauteng
Baphalane	Sesotho		Kwena	Crocodile	Bakwena
Baphiri	Setswana		Phiri	Hyenna	
Baphuthing	Sesotho		Phuthi	Duiker	
Bapo	Setswana/Matebele a Mmusi		Tlou	Elephant	Northwest
Barokologadi	Setswana		Noko	Porcupine	
Batlharo	Setswana		Tshwene	Baboon	
Batswapong	Setswana	Botswana		Hare or Kgope	Bapedi
Makgolokwe/Makholokoe	Sesotho/Sekholokoe		Phuthi	Small buck	
Makhoakhoa	Sesotho	South Africa, Lesotho	Koena, descendants of Napo via third born Molapo. Grandchildren of Molapo named Kherehloa and Mahlatsi began this tribe.	Crocodile, Lephutse	Telle River and Matatiele, Butha-buthe, Makhoakhoeng and sporadic parts of Lesotho; R.S.A: Vaal, Tshwane, Qwaqwa and the greater Free State and parts of North West Province.
Mandoro/Makololo	Sesotho/-	Lesotho, South Africa, Zimbabwe, Zambia	Kwena	Crocodile	Bafokeng
Mapulane	Sesotho ba Leboa/ Sepulane	South Africa Limpopo/ Mpumalanga	Tau	Lion	Bammangwato, Barolong
Barolong	Setswana	North West	Tholo	Kudu	Mahikeng
Basia	Sesotho		Katse	Wild Cat	Bakgatla
Batau	Sesotho ba Leboa	South Africa Limpopo	Tau	Lion	
Bataung	Sesotho, Setswana, Sesotho sa Lebowa	South Africa	Tau	Lion	Bahurutshe
Batawana	Batswana	Botswana	Phuti	Duiker	Bangwato
Batlhako	Setswana	South Africa	Tlou	Elephant	Rustenburg, Mabeskraal
Batlhaping	Setswana	South Africa, Namibia	Tholo ba nina Tlhapi	Kudu/Fish	Barolong
Batlhware	Setswana		Tshwene	Baboon	
Batlokoa	Sesotho, Setswana, Sesotho sa Leboa		Noko, Nkoe, Thakadu	Wild Cat	Bakgatla
Batloung	Setswana, Sesotho		Tlou	Elephant	
Batsatsing			Letsatsi	Sun	
Batšoeneng	Sesotho, Setswana, Sesotho sa Leboa		Tšoene	Baboon	Bahurutshe
Bakopa	Sesotho ba Leboa	South Africa Limpopo	Kwena	Crocodile	BaKwena
Bakutswe	Sesotho ba Leboa/Sepulane	South Africa Limpopo/Mpumalanga	Kwena	Crocodile	Barolong
Bahwaduba	Setswana	South Africa, Kgwadibeng-Mathibestad	Nare (Kgomo ya naga) Buffalo	Bakgatla/Matebele	
Baroka ba Lebole/Bakone	Sesotho sa Leboa	South Africa, Limpopo	Phuthi	Duiker	
Baroka	Sesotho sa Lebowa	South Africa, Limpopo	Tlou	Elephant	
Bakwena Ba Ma-Thebe (also known as Bantwane or Bantoane)	Setswana	South Africa	Kwena, Tholo, Kgabo	Crocodile	Bammangwato, Barolong, Bakgatla, Musane-Dikwena, Mmusane Kotu
Banogeng	Setswana	South Africa	Noga	Snake	North West, Mahikeng, Matile
