= Burn Out (Sipho Mabuse song) =

Single by Sipho Mabuse
- Released: 1984
- Genre: Township Jive, Pop
- Length: 4:00
- Label: Gallo Music
- Songwriter(s): Sipho Mabuse

"Burn Out", a song by Sipho Mabuse, became one of the first major crossover hits in South Africa during the early 1980s, selling more than 500,000 copies.

This song paved the way for a distribution deal with Virgin Records in order for it to be released in the UK. It was also released in Germany, Japan and the US.

Over the years the song has been remixed and covered by other artists, such as Timothy Moloi on the album Love That Music.
