= Don't Tell Me It's Over =

Don't Tell Me It's Over may refer to:

- "Don't Tell Me It's Over", a 1985 song by Michael Bolton off the album Everybody's Crazy
- "Don't Tell Me It's Over", a 1995 song by Samson off the re-release of the 1990 album Refugee
- "Don't Tell Me It's Over", a 2001 song by Blink-182 off the album Take Off Your Pants and Jacket
- "Don't Tell Me It's Over", a 2008 song by Gym Class Heroes off the album The Quilt
- "Don't Tell Me It's Over", a 2009 song by Timothy Moloi off the album Love That Music
- "Don't Tell Me It's Over", a 2010 song by Amy McDonald off the album A Curious Thing

== See also ==
- "Don't Tell Me It's Over Now" (song), a 2010s song by Bonnie Tyler cut from and not released on the album Rocks and Honey
- "Tell Me It's Over", a single by Avril Lavigne
