= Hans Christian Andersen (film) =

1952 film by Charles Vidor

- Theatrical release poster
- Directed by: Charles Vidor
- Screenplay by: Moss Hart
- Story by: Myles Connolly
- Produced by: Samuel Goldwyn
- Starring: Danny Kaye; Farley Granger; Jeanmaire
- Cinematography: Harry Stradling
- Edited by: Daniel Mandell
- Music by: Frank Loesser (words and music); Walter Scharf (musical direction)
- Production company: Samuel Goldwyn Productions
- Distributed by: RKO Radio Pictures
- Release dates: November 25, 1952 (New York City); December 19, 1952 (United States)
- Running time: 112 minutes
- Country: United States
- Language: English
- Budget: $4 million
- Box office: $6 million (US rentals)

Hans Christian Andersen is a 1952 American musical film directed by Charles Vidor, produced by Samuel Goldwyn, and starring Danny Kaye, Farley Granger, and Jeanmaire. The screenplay by Moss Hart is based on a story by Myles Connolly.

Although the film is nominally about 19th-century Danish author Hans Christian Andersen, the film is a romantic fiction and does not follow his actual life. Andersen is portrayed as a small-town cobbler with a childlike heart and a vivid imagination.

A large part of the narrative is told through ballet and song, with music and lyrics by Frank Loesser. Many of Andersen's most famous stories, such as "The Ugly Duckling", "Thumbelina", "The Emperor's New Clothes", and "The Little Mermaid" are referenced. The film was an international success at the box office. It was Kaye's final film to be produced by Goldwyn.

== Plot ==
In the 1830s, in the Danish village of Odense, cobbler Hans Christian Andersen spends his day spinning fairy tales for the village children. One day, the stern schoolmaster implores the burgomaster and councilmen to curtail Hans' habit of distracting the students with his storytelling. Hans finally returns to his shop, where his teenage assistant, the orphan Peter, begs him to stop causing trouble.

When the children do not arrive at school the next day, the schoolmaster deduces that Hans is distracting them again, and Hans is banished from the town. Peter tries to save Hans by suggesting that they travel to Copenhagen.

After a sea voyage, Hans and Peter arrive in Copenhagen. When Hans stands on a statue of the king, police arrest him for defaming the image of their leader. Peter, who escaped the police by hiding by the back entrance of the Royal Theatre, overhears choreographer Niels demand that a company producer summon a cobbler and convinces them to bail Hans out of jail.

Hans is freed and taken to the theater, where he becomes entranced by the beauty and talent of a Royal Danish Ballet rehearsal. Lead ballerina Doro, whose slippers need adjustment, gives them to Hans, who is immediately smitten with her. Peter learns that Niels and Doro are happily married despite their theatrical quarrels. Hans writes a love letter to Doro in the form of a fable called "The Little Mermaid", telling her that she has chosen the wrong man. That night, while Peter surreptitiously reads the letter, a gust of wind whisks it from his hands and carries it into the theater, where a stage doorman delivers it to Doro.

The next day, the entire ballet company embarks on their annual tour, leaving Hans bereft, but he soon finds comfort entertaining a new group of children with his stories. Lars, a sad boy with a shaved head, remains behind after the other children tease him. Hans tells him the story of an ugly duckling who is ostracized by his peers until he becomes a handsome swan.

Lars' father, a newspaper publisher, thanks Hans for helping his son and offers to publish "The Ugly Duckling" in the newspaper. Hans is overjoyed and asks to be credited as "Hans Christian Andersen" instead of "Hans the Cobbler", running in the street singing his full name with pride.

When the ballet company returns, Doro tells Hans that they have created a ballet based on his story "The Little Mermaid", which Hans believes is a sign of her love for him. Peter warns Hans that Doro will humiliate him. At the opening of the new ballet, Hans tries to deliver numerous pairs of brightly colored satin slippers he had made for Doro backstage, but Niels locks him in a closet to prevent him from disrupting the performers. While Hans listens to the music and dreams of his story, the performance opens on the stage.

The next morning, Doro summons Hans and discovers that he is in love with her and has misunderstood her relationship with Niels. When Niels insults Hans by offering to pay him for "The Little Mermaid", Hans refuses and claims his writing was a fluke. Doro accepts the slippers and allows Hans to leave, upset that she has unwittingly broken the heart of such a kind and gifted man. On the road to Odense, Hans encounters Peter and rekindles their friendship. Upon reaching town, Hans is greeted as a celebrity and regales the citizens, including the schoolmaster, with his moral tales.

== Cast ==
- Danny Kaye as Hans Christian Andersen
- Farley Granger as Niels
- Jeanmaire as Doro
- Joey Walsh as Peter
- Philip Tonge as Otto
- Erik Bruhn as the hussar
- Roland Petit as the prince in "The Little Mermaid" ballet
- John Brown as schoolmaster
- John Qualen as burgomaster
- Jeanne Lafayette as Celine
- Robert Malcolm as stage doorman
- George Chandler as Gerta's father
- Fred Kelsey as first gendarme
- Gil Perkins as second gendarme
- Peter Votrian as Lars
- Barrie Chase and Sylvia Lewis as ballerinas (uncredited)
- Beverly Washburn as girl outside jail window (uncredited)

== Production ==
Producer Samuel Goldwyn conceived the idea for the film in 1936 and employed numerous writers to work on early drafts of the screenplay over the years. In 1941, he was reportedly in discussions with Walt Disney Studios to produce the film, but the deal did not materialize.

The film was eventually produced in the spring of 1952. As Danish authorities were not consulted on the film, there were complaints from Denmark that the film was a fairy tale rather than the true story of Andersen's life, and the Danish Foreign Office considered issuing a formal protest against the film.

== Soundtrack ==
The soundtrack features eight songs, all with words and music by Frank Loesser.

- "The King's New Clothes"
- "The Inch Worm"
- "I'm Hans Christian Andersen"
- "Wonderful Copenhagen"
- "Thumbelina"
- "The Ugly Duckling"
- "Anywhere I Wander"
- "No Two People"

A studio cast recording of was released by Decca Records and includes two Sylvia Fine originals written specifically for the album, "Uncle Pockets" and "There's a Hole at the Bottom of the Sea", as well as Danny Kaye's narration of two "Tubby the Tuba" stories by Paul Tripp. The songs were originally released as a series of four 78-rpm singles, with two songs per disc, a 45-rpm album and a 10" LP.

The music for The Little Mermaid ballet incorporates passages from various pieces by Franz Liszt, including "Gnomenreigen" and the Mephisto Waltzes.

== Release ==
The film premiered in New York City on November 25, 1952, at the Paris Theatre and Criterion Theatre, and received a wide release in both the United States and United Kingdom on December 19. The film opened in Copenhagen on September 6, 1953.

== Reception ==
=== Box office ===
Hans Christian Andersen grossed $6 million in North America, making it one of the top-ten grossing films of the year. In its first six days at two theaters in Copenhagen, the film grossed $80,000.

=== Critical response ===
In a contemporary review for The New York Times, critic Bosley Crowther called the film "as pretty and graceful a picture as has come down the rocky pike this year" and wrote: "Mr. Hart has not created a character for Mr. Kaye to play, let alone a credible reflection of the famous Danish teller of tales. His Hans Christian Andersen is lumpish, humorless and wan. No wonder Mr. Kaye is unable to stoke up magnetism in the role. However, he does bravely manage to make merry with Mr. Loesser's songs and convey something of the jovial spirit of a musical fairy tale. ... Withal, the staging is handsome, in a story-book cut-out style, and even though the motif isn't Danish, exactly, it has a cheerful air."

=== Accolades ===
Award	Category	Recipient(s)	Result	Ref.
Academy Awards	Best Art Direction – Color	Art direction: Richard Day and Antoni Clavé; Set decoration: Howard Bristol	Nominated	
Academy Awards	Best Cinematography – Color	Harry Stradling	Nominated	
Academy Awards	Best Costume Design – Color	Antoni Clavé, Mary Wills and Barbara Karinska	Nominated	
Academy Awards	Best Scoring of a Musical Picture	Walter Scharf	Nominated	
Academy Awards	Best Song	"Thumbelina"; Music and lyrics by Frank Loesser	Nominated	
Academy Awards	Best Sound Recording	Gordon E. Sawyer	Nominated	
Directors Guild of America Awards	Outstanding Directorial Achievement in Motion Pictures	Charles Vidor	Nominated	
Golden Globe Awards	Best Motion Picture – Musical or Comedy	Hans Christian Andersen	Nominated	
Golden Globe Awards	Best Actor in a Motion Picture – Musical or Comedy	Danny Kaye	Nominated	
Writers Guild of America Awards	Best Written American Musical	Moss Hart and Myles Connolly	Nominated	

In 2004, "Thumbelina" was nominated for inclusion in the American Film Institute's AFI's 100 Years...100 Songs list. In 2006, the film was nominated for inclusion in the AFI's Greatest Movie Musicals list.

== Legacy ==
The film was first telecast by ABC in 1966. Because the film is too long for a two-hour time slot, ABC presented it as a family special with Dane Victor Borge as host, padding the telecast to 150 minutes.

"Inchworm" was featured in a Season 3 episode of The Muppet Show in which Danny Kaye appeared as the guest star.
