= Children's Christmas Songs =

Studio album by Franciscus Henri

Studio album by Franciscus Henri
- Released: 1981
- Recorded: Dex Studios, Melbourne
- Label: John Bye

Franciscus Henri chronology
Sunshine Rainbows and Violins (1981)	Children's Christmas Songs (1981)	Fifty Golden Nursery Rhymes (1981)

Children's Christmas Songs is the sixth studio album by Dutch-Australian children's music performer Franciscus Henri.

The album was issued in 1981 under John Bye Records on cassette; and then re-released by Move Records on CD in 1989. The rights then belonged to Franciscus Henri Productions.

== Track listing ==
1. Christmas Bells (F.Henri)
2. Away in a Manger (Trad - F.Henri)
3. Hey, Hey It's Cold Tonight (F.Henri)
4. Silent Night
5. Twinkle, Twinkle, Little Star
6. My Sweet Santa
7. Isn't He a Lovely Baby (F.Henri)
8. I Saw Three Ships
9. Children from One to Ninety Four (F.Henri)
10. Jingle Bells
11. Borning Day
12. While Shepherds Watched
13. Hark in the Stable (F.Henri)
14. It's a Long Way (F.Henri)
15. We Three Kings
16. We Wish You a Merry Christmas
17. Ding Dong Who Rang the Bell
18. Once in Royal David's City
