= Stories and Songs (Franciscus Henri album) =

Studio album by Franciscus Henri
- Released: 1993
- Recorded: 1993
- Studio: Sully Studios, Melbourne
- Genre: Children's
- Length: 35:27
- Label: ABC
- Producer: Franciscus Henri

Franciscus Henri chronology
My Favourite Nursery Rhymes (1993)	Stories and Songs (1993)	I'm Hans Christian Andersen (1994)

Stories and Songs is a spoken word children's album, released in 1993 by Australian-based artist, Franciscus Henri, under ABC Music's ABC for Kids label on compact disc.

== Track listing ==
All tracks written by Franciscus Henri

1. "Go Wrong Day" / "The Awful Adventures of Andy the Angry Ant" / "Go Wrong Day": – 18:14
2. "Long Way to Go" / "Benjamin Snail's Christmas" / "Away in a Manger" / "Long Way to Go": – 17:13
