= Love That Music =

Studio album by Timothy Moloi
- Released: 1 July 2009
- Recorded: 2009
- Genre: pop, soul
- Length: 47:30
- Label: Thatch Music
- Producer: James F. Bassingthwaighte

Singles from Love That Music
- 1. "Friday Morning" Released: June 01, 2009

Love That Music is the 2009 debut album by the South African recording artist Timothy Moloi.

== Recording ==
First released by Thatch Music on 1 July 2009, Love That Music, was recorded at Undahaus Studios in Johannesburg, South Africa.

In 2010 the album was nominated for two South African Music Awards, namely Best Producer (James Bassingthwaighte and Jaydine Baron) and Best Engineer (Robin Walsh).

== Reception ==
- The Star: "probably the most feel good album of the year" - Therese Owen, The Star Tonight
- The Herald: "one of the most exciting new vocal talents to hit the scene in recent years" - Leon Muston, CD Scene
- Daily Sun: "This is talent at its best... the velvet-voiced youngster is going places with this debut solo album" - Mathews Mpete
- City Press: "Love That Music is something different, well mixed and has a vintage feel to it" - Luyanda Longwe, City Pulse

== Track listing ==
1. "Love That Music" – 00:38
2. "Friday Morning" – 04:37
3. "Don't Tell Me It's Over" – 03:47
4. "Don't You Worry About A Thing" – 03:49
5. "Give Me Your Love" – 03:29
6. "Keeps Getting Better" – 03:52
7. "Close Your Eyes" – 03:57
8. "Won't Turn Back" – 04:57
9. "Feel Me Smile" – 03:42
10. "Burn Out" (Thatch Remix)" – 04:18
11. "Come To Me" – 03:10
12. "Memories" – 04:29
13. "Pretty Necklace" (Hidden Track) – 02:15

== Production ==
- Produced by James Bassingthwaighte
- Co-produced by Jaydine Baron and Michael Bester for Thatch Music
- Mixed by Robin Walsh at Undahaus Studios, Johannesburg
- Engineered by Robin Walsh at Undahaus Studios, Johannesburg
- Mastered by Geoff Pesche at Abbey Road Studios, London
