= Sipho Mabuse =

South African musician (born 1951)

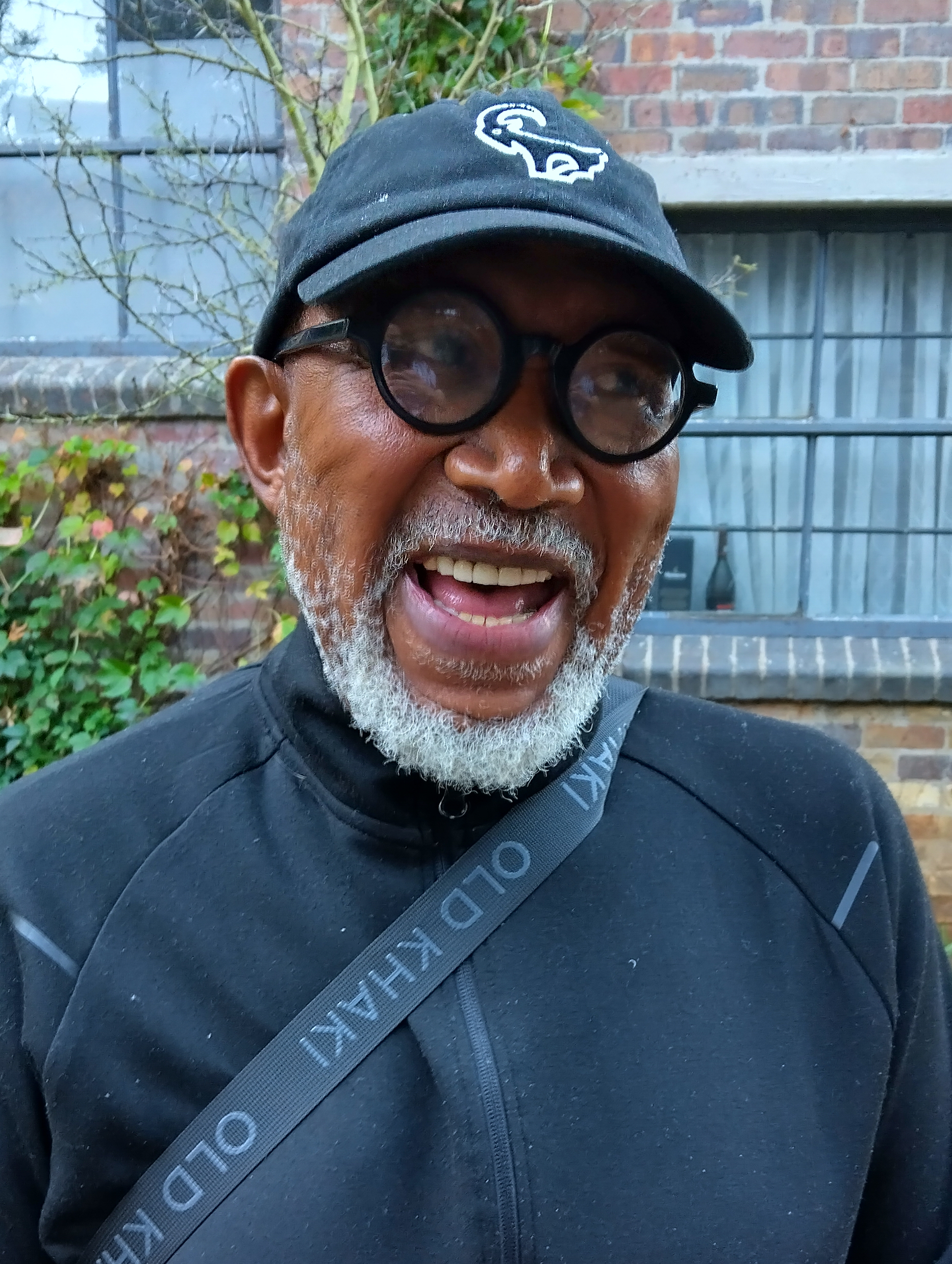
- Mabuse at a Freedom Day event in Johannesburg, 27 April 2026.

Background information
- Born: Sipho Cecil Peter Mabuse; 2 November 1951 (age 74); Soweto, Johannesburg, South Africa
- Genres: Afro pop
- Years active: 1970–present
- Website: hotstixmabuse.co.za
- Children: Mpho Skeef (daughter)
- Awards: Order of Ikhamanga (Silver)

Sipho Cecil Peter Mabuse (born 2 November 1951), known professionally as Sipho "Hotstix" Mabuse, is a South African singer-songwriter.

Mabuse grew up in Soweto. His mother was Zulu and his father was Tswana. Sipho and his band used to be managed by Solly Nkuta. After dropping out of school in the 1960s, Mabuse got his start in the Afro-soul group the Beaters in the mid-1970s. After a successful tour of Zimbabwe they changed the group's name to Harari, an afrosoul band led by Mabuse. When they returned to their homeland in South Africa they began to draw almost exclusively on American-style funk, soul, and pop music, sung in Zulu and Sotho as well as English. He has also recorded and produced for, among others, Miriam Makeba, Hugh Masekela, Ray Phiri and Sibongile Khumalo.

Mabuse is responsible for the song "Burn Out", which in the early 1980s sold more than 500,000 copies, and the giant (Disco Shangaan) hit of the late 1980s, "Jive Soweto".

His daughter is the singer Mpho Skeef.

Mabuse returned to school at the age of 60, completing his matric (grade 12) in 2012 at Peter Lengene Community Learning Centre. He stated that he intended to continue on to college and study anthropology. President Jacob Zuma praised him for giving "inspiration to all of us by showing us that one is never too old for education".

== Allegations of unlawful enrichment at SAMRO ==
In 2019, the Southern African Music Rights Organisation (SAMRO) sued Mabuse for unlawful enrichment. According to the lawsuit, Mabuse and a number of other members of the leadership of SAMRO overpaid themselves by more than R1.6 Million rand. Mabuse was allegedly irregularly overpaid by R171 000.

SAMRO would later become the centre of a scandal regarding the underpayment of royalties to artists, much of this taking place during Mabuse's time working for the organisation.

== Biography ==
Sipho Cecil Peter Mabuse was born on 2 November 1951 in Masakeng (Shantytown), Orlando West. At the age of eight he began playing drums, which he went on to master, earning the nickname "Hotstix" by which he is still known. He went on to become a multi-instrumentalist, learning and mastering other instruments including the flute, piano, saxophone, kalimba, timbales and African drums.

Mabuse's music career began when he formed a group called The Beaters with two of his friends, Selby Ntuli and "Om" Alec Khaoli, when he was 15 years old. After touring Zimbabwe (Rhodesia) in 1974, and dedicating a song called "Harari" to the people of that town, the group later changed its stage name to Harari –and went on to gain acclaim as one of the most successful acts that dominated the local music scene in the 1970s with its "feel good vibes of Afro-rock spiced with some get down boogie woogie space jabs", "vibrating in percussion in toto, conga drumming and some breath taking wailing of flutes and pennywhistles". In 1978, Harari was invited to perform in the USA with fellow musician Hugh Masekela, but the band's leader Selby Ntuli died, leaving Mabuse as the new leader. Under the new front man, the group went on to support and back renowned musicians such as Percy Sledge, Timmy Thomas, Letta Mbulu, Brook Benton, and Wilson Pickett on their South African tours. In 1982, the group split, giving Mabuse a chance to launch his solo career, making him one of the pioneers of township pop, while riding the wave of disco music.

In 1983, Mabuse released his crossover hit "Burn Out", which catapulted his solo career to stardom, selling an excess of half a million copies, and which remains popular today. Some of his other popular songs include his 1986 hit "Jive Soweto" and the 1989 anti-apartheid anthem "Chant of the Marching".

During his 50-plus year-long music career, Mabuse has performed across Africa, Europe and the USA. He has recorded and produced legendary artists such as Miriam Makeba, Hugh Masekela, Ray Phiri and Sibongile Khumalo. He was the owner of the legendary Kippies nightclub and sat on the boards of The National Arts Council and SAMRO (South African Musicians Rights Organisation).

He has also collected many accolades during his career. In 2005, he received a South African Music Award Lifetime Achievement Award, and in 2018 he was bestowed with the Silver Order of Ikhamanga for his contribution to the field of music.

In 2013, Gallo Records released a new "greatest hits" collection on CD and DVD.

On 2 November 2021, Mabuse celebrated his 70th birthday, and he continues to perform regularly.
