= I'm Hans Christian Andersen =

Studio album by Franciscus Henri
- Released: 1994 - re-released 1998
- Recorded: Sully Studios, Melbourne

Franciscus Henri chronology
Stories and Songs (1994)	I'm Hans Christian Andersen (1994)	Hello Mister Whiskers (1997)

I'm Hans Christian Andersen was released in 1994 by Australian children's musician, Franciscus Henri, via ABC Music's (ABC for Kids) on compact disc. It received an ARIA Music Award nomination in 1995 for Best Children's Album.

== Track listing ==
1. "I'm Hans Christian Andersen"
2. "The Ugly Duckling"
3. "Sunshine, Rainbows and Umbrellas" (F.Henri)
4. "An Old Tin Can" (F.Henri)
5. "Scarecrow" (F.Henri)
6. "Three Little Sparrows" (F.Henri)
7. "When the Train Comes Along"
8. "Piggy on the Railway"
9. "Bessie the Steam Train"
10. "Phone Call to Grandma" (F.Henri)
11. "Old People" (F.Henri)
12. "My Bag of Lollies" (F.Henri)
13. "The Green Eyed Dragon"
14. "Jellybean Street" (F.Henri)
15. "Lighthouse"
16. "Baby Beluga"
17. "The Albatross Song" (Pacific Blue) (F.Henri)
18. "School Days" (F.Henri)
19. "Fishes Wishes" (F.Henri)
20. "Inch Worm"
21. "Thumbalina"
22. "Tick Tock" (F.Henri)
23. "Mummy Give Me a Drink of Water"

== Video ==
Franciscus Henri sings I'm Hans Christian Andersen and other songs
- Directed by: Lindesay Dresdon
- Produced by: Lindesay Dresdon
- Starring: Franciscus Henri
- Distributed by: Roadshow Entertainment / ABC Video (#14475)
- Release date: 26 September 1994
- Running time: 30 minutes
- Country: Australia

Franciscus Henri sings I'm Hans Christian Andersen and other songs is a Franciscus Henri video that was released in 1994.

=== Songs ===
1. "Phone Call to Grandma"
2. "I'm Hans Christian Andersen"
3. "The Ugly Duckling"
4. "Four Rubbish Bins"
5. "My Bag of Lollies"
6. "The Little Red Car Song"
7. "Sea Dreams"
8. "Sailing"
9. "At the Bottom of the Sea"
10. "Three Jellyfish"
11. "Thumbalina"
12. "Mummy Give Me a Drink of Water"

=== Releases ===
==== VHS ====
- Australia: 26 September 1994
