= Franciscus Henri =

- Also known as: Professor Henri, Mister Whiskers
- Born: Franciscus Henricus Antheunis; 7 August 1947 (age 79); The Hague, Netherlands
- Origin: Melbourne, Victoria, Australia
- Genres: Folk, children's, gospel, pop
- Occupations: Musician, songwriter, children's entertainer, teacher
- Instruments: Vocals, guitar
- Years active: 1969–present
- Label: Fable

Franciscus Henricus Antheunis, professionally known as Franciscus Henri (born 7 August 1947, in The Hague, The Netherlands), is a musician and children's entertainer. He has dual Dutch and Australian nationality. In 1970 he gained national prominence when he competed in the TV talent quest New Faces, which led to a recording contract with the Melbourne-based independent label Fable Records. From 1997, he also performs as Mister Whiskers, a travelling singer who loves children and performs for them with his dog companion, Smiggy.

== Biography ==
Franciscus Henricus Antheunis Jr. was born on 7 August 1947 in The Hague, The Netherlands. In 1956, his father, Franciscus Henricus Antheunis Sr., (born 25 October 1914) and his mother Pietertje (née Van Der Pol, born 21 September 1919) migrated to Australia on board the Dutch ship Johan van Oldenbarnevelt with his older brother Roelof A (born 8 November 1943), Franciscus Henri and his younger sister Maria T (born 28 June 1950). Henri finished his education in Australia and became a qualified secondary arts and craft teacher. In October 1969, Henri performed at the 1st Annual Festival of Gospel Music with Faye Meadows, David Meadows, Leonie Hawthorn and 3-in-1 Gospel Jazz Trio.

In 1970 he gained national prominence when he competed as a folk musician on a TV talent quest, New Faces, which led to a recording contract with the Melbourne-based independent label Fable Records – label boss, Ron Tudor, was a judge on New Faces. In September 1970 Henri's debut single, "Mary and Me" was issued by Fable and he recorded further singles and an LP, Ding Dong Who Rang the Bell (1972). His second album, Gabriel's Mother's Highway (1972) is described as "a refreshing folk album ... a slightly religious but innocent era".

In 1972 Henri toured with English poet Sydney Carter, and in 1973 he left teaching to join the Monash University Theatre company as a set designer, actor and musician. He participated in the Alexander Theatre productions of Puckoon, Under Milkwood (both 1974), Laertes (1970s) and Giant John (1975). In 1976 he toured throughout Australia and New Zealand supporting the English-Irish comedian Spike Milligan. Henri formed a production company in that year, and began producing performances throughout Australia in conjunction with state arts councils.

From 1979 to October 1980, Henri was a member of the original cast of Shirl's Neighbourhood, a children's television show, presenting his own segments as himself and, as an early alter-ego, Professor Henri.

By 1982, Henri was married.

It was around this time that Henri started to perform children's concerts.

Henri also wrote and presented a series of programs and ads for the Victorian Christian Television Association. He also appeared on the Q7 program filmed in London, England.

In 1997 he started performing to children as his new character, MISTER WHISKERS, and released his first album under his new moniker, Hello Mister Whiskers, which was nominated for the Best Children's Album Aria Award.

He has performed across the globe, including festivals such as: the Vancouver International Children's Festival and Port Fairy Folk Festival (seven times); and (as MISTER WHISKERS) is the only performer to have played at every Warrnambool Fun 4 Kids Festival since its inception 1998. He has also performed in Singapore a number of times with the Singapore Symphony Orchestra.

From 1989 to 2002 he was a recording artist for ABC Music (ABC for kids), as well as a creator and producer of cover designs, for his own and other releases.

He is the writer of the popular song 'Ducks Like Rain' a cover version recorded by Canadian entertainer Raffi

His most recent work is Nothing Fixed or Final, the words and music of Sydney Carter, as performed by Henri. He has presented it throughout Victoria and recently in Boston US. In London UK. he performed in the Sydney Carter memorial concert(Oct 2007)

He has so far received seven ARIA award nominations for his various recording work.

Franciscus is also an exhibiting painter.

== Discography ==
- 1972 Ding Dong Who Rang the Bell
- 1972 Gabriel's Mother's Highway
- 1975 Pigtails
- 1976 Lord of the Dance
- 1981 Sunshine Rainbows and Violins
- 1981 Children's Christmas Songs
- 1985 Fifty Golden Nursery Rhymes
- 1988 Tree House

=== Releases on CD ===
Year	Album name	Distributor	Other notes
1989	Tree House	ABC Music (ABC for Kids)	
1990	White Pyjamas	ABC Music (ABC for Kids)	
1991	Dancing in the Kitchen	ABC Music (ABC for Kids)	Nominated for Aria: Best Children's Album
1992	Walking on the Milky Way	ABC Music (ABC for Kids)	Nominated for Aria: Best Children's Album
1993	Merry Christmas	ABC Music (ABC for Kids)	
1993	My Favourite Nursery Rhymes	ABC Music (ABC for Kids)	Nominated for Aria: Best Children's Album
1994	Stories and Songs	ABC Music (ABC for Kids)	(Spoken Word) album
1994	I'm Hans Christian Andersen	ABC Music (ABC for Kids)	Nominated for Aria: Best Children's Album
1997	Hello Mister Whiskers	ABC Music (ABC for Kids)	Nominated for Aria: Best Children's Album
1998	Hooray for Mister Whiskers	ABC Music (ABC for Kids)	Nominated for Aria: Best Children's Album
1998	Mister Whiskers: My Favourite Nursery Rhymes	ABC Music (ABC for Kids)	A re-release of My Favourite Nursery Rhymes
1999	Mister Whiskers: Monkey Business	ABC Music (ABC for Kids)	Nominated for Aria: Best Children's Album
1999	Board of Studies "Street Sense" - Road Safety Songs	ABC Music (ABC for Kids)	
2002	The Best of Franciscus Henri	ABC Music (ABC for Kids)	
2003	Explorer Semester One	Music Makers	
2004	Maestro Semester One	Music Makers	
2004	Explorer Semester Two	Music Makers	
2004	Maestro Semester Two	Music Makers	
2005	Nothing Fixed or Final	Franciscus Henri Productions	

=== Videos/DVDs ===
- OH NO! It's The Franciscus Henri Video (1992)
- I'm Hans Christian Andersen (1994)
- Hello MISTER WHISKERS! (1998)
- My Favourite Nursery Rhymes (2000)
- Sing a Song in Singapore

== Awards and nominations ==
=== APRA Music Awards ===
Year	Nominated works	Award	Result	Ref	Notes
1995	"We Like Wearing Pyjamas"	Most Performed Children's Work	Nominated		Nominated as songwriter

=== ARIA Music Awards ===
Year	Nominated works	Award	Result
1992	Dancing in the Kitchen	Best Children's Album	Nominated
1993	Walking on the Milky Way	Best Children's Album	Nominated
1994	My Favourite Nursery Rhymes	Best Children's Album	Nominated
1995	I'm Hans Christian Andersen	Best Children's Album	Nominated
1997	Mr Whiskers	Best Children's Album	Nominated
1999	Hooray for Mr Whiskers	Best Children's Album	Nominated
2000	Monkey Business	Best Children's Album	Nominated
