= Hooray for Mister Whiskers =

Studio album by Franciscus Henri
- Released: 1998
- Recorded: Sully Studios, Melbourne
- Genre: Children's music
- Label: ABC For Kids

Franciscus Henri chronology
Hello Mister Whiskers (1997)	Hooray for Mister Whiskers (1998)	Mister Whiskers: My Favourite Nursery Rhymes (1998)

Hooray for Mister Whiskers is a children's music album released by Franciscus Henri in 1998. It is his second album under the character Mister Whiskers and includes his dog, Smiggy. It was nominated for the 1999 ARIA Music Award for Best Children's Album but lost to the Hooley Dooleys Pop. In July 2001 it was re-released on both CD and music cassette formats.

== Track listing ==
All songs written by Franciscus Henri unless otherwise noted. All arrangements by Franciscus Henri.

1. "Hooray for Mister Whiskers"
2. "Mister Whiskers Here, Mister Whiskers There"
3. "My Dog Smiggy"
4. "I Tricked You" (G Eastoe)
5. "Little Red Wagon" (Traditional)
6. "E Compare" (Traditional)
7. "Can I Go Outside?"
8. "Tricycle Song"
9. "Freddie Frog" (Traditional)
10. "Little Bird Tapping" (Traditional)
11. "I Have a Little Dog"
12. "Down by the Bay" (Traditional)
13. "Bugs and Beetles"
14. "The More We Get Together" (Traditional)
15. "Skippity Hop" (Z R Mchenry)
16. "Merry-Go-Round" (Z R Mchenry)
17. "If I Had"
18. "Are You in the Mood?"
19. "Sunrise"
20. "Tick-Tock Big Clock" (Z R Mchenry)
21. "Tick-Tock Baby Clock" (Z R Mchenry)
22. "Rock-A-Bye Lullaby"
