= Mister Whiskers: My Favourite Nursery Rhymes =

Studio album by Franciscus Henri
- Released: 1998 (re-release)
- Recorded: Sully Studios, Melbourne
- Genre: Children's music
- Label: ABC for Kids

Franciscus Henri chronology
Hooray for Mister Whiskers (1998)	Mister Whiskers: My Favourite Nursery Rhymes (1998)	Mister Whiskers: Monkey Business (1999)

Mister Whiskers: My Favourite Nursery Rhymes is the 1998 re-release children's album of My Favourite Nursery Rhymes (originally released in 1993) by Franciscus Henri, both under Australian Broadcasting Corporation (ABC) Music's ABC for Kids. It achieved Gold sales certification due to sales in excess of 35,000 units in Australia. Notably, the album contains 23 separate tracks, but 17 of these are medleys ranging between two and four rhymes each, totalling fifty-five for the album, though many only go through a single chorus. At the ARIA Music Awards of 1994 the original version received a nomination for Best Children's Album.

== Track listing ==
1. Medley 1:
  1. "Sing a Song of Sixpence"
  2. "Old King Cole"
  3. "I'm The King of the Castle"
2. "There Was a Crooked Man"
3. Medley 2:
  1. "To Market to Market"
  2. "This Little Pig"
4. "Tom, Tom the Pipers Son"
5. Medley 3:
  1. "Little Bo Peep"
  2. "Mary Had a Little Lamb"
  3. "Baa, Baa Black Sheep"
6. Medley 4:
  1. "Hickory Dickory Dock"
  2. "Three Blind Mice"
  3. "Ring-A-Ring-A-Rosie"
7. "Aikin Drum"
8. Medley 5:
  1. "Jack and Jill"
  2. "Old Mother Hubbard"
  3. "Oh, Where Has My Little Dog Gone?"
9. Medley 6:
  1. "I Have a Dolly Dressed In Blue"
  2. "Polly Put the Kettle On"
10. Medley 7:
  1. "Miss Polly Had a Dolly"
  2. "Hush Little Baby"
  3. "Lady Bird Lady Bird"
11. Medley 8:
  1. "Six Little Ducks"
  2. "Hickety Pickety My Black Hen"
  3. "Goosey, Goosey Gander"
12. Medley 9:
  1. "Rub a Dub, Dub"
  2. "Row, Row, Row Your Boat"
  3. "I Saw a Ship"
13. "Oranges and Lemons"
14. Medley 10:
  1. "There Was an Old Woman"
  2. "Boys and Girls Come Out to Play"
  3. "Georgie Porgie"
15. Medley 11:
  1. "See Saw Marjorie Daw"
  2. "Rock A Bye Baby"
16. Medley 12:
  1. "I Love Little Pussy"
  2. "Three Little Kittens"
  3. "Hey Diddle, Diddle"
  4. "Pussy Cat, Pussy Cat"
17. Medley 13:
  1. "I Had a Little Nut Tree"
  2. "Here We Go Round the Mulberry Bush"
  3. "Mary, Mary, Quite Contrary"
18. Medley 14:
  1. "Twinkle, Twinkle, Little Star"
  2. "Wee Willy Winky"
19. Medley 15:
  1. "Humpty Dumpty"
  2. "Grand Old Duke of York"
  3. "London Bridge Is Falling Down"
20. Medley 16:
  1. "Little Miss Muffet"
  2. "Ipsy Wipsy Spider"
  3. "It's Raining, It's Pouring"
21. "Cock-A-Doodle Doo"
22. Medley 17:
  1. "Muffin Man"
  2. "Pat–A-Cake"
  3. "Simple Simon"
  4. "Pop Goes the Weasel"
23. Yankee Doodle

== Certifications ==
Region	Certification	Certified units/sales
Australia (ARIA)	Gold	35,000^{^}
^{^} Shipments figures based on certification alone.
