= Tree House (Franciscus Henri album) =

Studio album by Franciscus Henri
- Released: 1988
- Recorded: 1987 Timbertop Studios, home recording
- Genre: Children's
- Length: 35:00
- Labels: Pickwick, ABC

Franciscus Henri chronology
Fifty Golden Nursery Rhymes (1985)	Tree House (1988)	White Pyjamas (1991)

Tree House or Treehouse is a children's music album which was recorded in 1987 by Dutch-Australian musician Franciscus Henri backed by The Lightning Creek Band. It was released in 1988 by ABC Records (ABC for Kids) and distributed by Pickwick Music on 33 rpm vinyl record, cassette and CD. The Lightning Creek Band's Scott Browne wrote nine of the tracks and arranged five traditional songs. Tree House was re-issued in 2007 on FHP Records under the name Mr Whiskers and The Lightning Creek Band. Mr Whiskers is Henri's alter-ego.

== Track listing ==
1. "Come to My Island" (Scott Browne) (Control)
2. "Listening to the Sea" (Browne) (Control)
3. "Sailing" (Browne) (Control)
4. "Down by the Station" (Lee Ricks, Slim Gaillard; arranged by Browne and Franciscus Henri) (Control/Albert Music)
5. "Gardening Song" (Henri) (Albert music)
6. "Flower Song" (Henri) (Albert music)
7. "Bugs and Beetles" (Henri) (Albert music)
8. "Strathbonkle" (Browne) (Control)
9. "Animal Fair" (Traditional; arranged by Browne and Henri) (Albert music)
10. "Mr. Frog" (Traditional; arranged by Browne and Henri) (Control/Albert Music)
11. "Um-Stick-a-Bubble" (Browne) (Control)
12. "Tree House" (Browne) (Control)
13. "Bubbles" (Browne) (Control)
14. "Are You Ticklish?" (Browne) (Control)
15. "At the Bottom of the Sea" (Henri) (Albert music)
16. "Three Jellyfish" (Henri) (Albert music)
17. "Horn Pipe" (Browne) (Control)
18. "Five Brightly Coloured Shining Fish" (Henri) (Albert music)
19. "Tigalayo" (Traditional; arranged by Browne and Henri)
20. "Kitchen Song" (Henri) (Albert music)
21. "Michael Finnegan" (Traditional; arranged by Browne and Henri) (Control/Albert Music)
