= Creepy treehouse =

Slang term about social media usage

Creepy treehouse is a social media term, or internet slang, referring to websites or technologies that are used for educational purposes but regarded by students as an invasion of privacy.

== History ==
The term was first described in 2008 by Utah Valley University instructional-design services director Jared Stein as "institutionally controlled technology/tool that emulates or mimics pre-existing [sic] technologies or tools that may already be in use by the learners, or by learners' peer groups." This was when social media such as Facebook was starting to become mainstream and professors would try and get students to interact with them on the site for educational purposes. Some professors would require their students to use Facebook or Twitter as part of class assignments.

== Usage ==
The term was first described as "technological innovations by faculty members that make students’ skin crawl." The term also refers to online accounts and websites that users tend to avoid, especially young people who avoid visiting the pages of educators and other adults. Author Martin Weller defines creepy treehouse as a digital space where authority figures are viewed as invading younger people's privacy. One such example is a professor giving his students an option to use a popular video game to learn about history instead of writing an essay. Students in that class chose to write the essay instead as the method was previously unmentioned and it was not an unnatural method of interaction. Another example given was Blackboard Sync, a feature that was used to connect the school website Blackboard with students' Facebook accounts.

== Solutions ==
University of Regina professor Alec Couros suggests that instead of "forcing" student participation with their own digital platforms, professors should use methods like online forums. Jason Jones of chronicle.com suggested letting students create social media groups for the class themselves and explaining why using technologies is required and important.

== See also ==
- Web 2.0
- Discussion boards
- Digital learning
