= Sunshine Rainbows and Violins =

Studio album by Franciscus Henri
- Released: 1981
- Recorded: Dex Studios, Melbourne
- Genre: Children's
- Length: 40:00
- Labels: John Bye, Move
- Producer: John Bye

Franciscus Henri chronology
Lord of the Dance (1976)	Sunshine Rainbows and Violins (1981)	Children's Christmas Songs (1982)

Sunshine Rainbows and Violins is the fifth studio album by Dutch-Australian children's musician Franciscus Henri. It was recorded with John Bye and the Kinder Players and was released in 1981 by John Bye Productions and distributed by Move Records on 33 rpm vinyl record and cassette. In 2011, it was remastered and re-released on CD with 28 tracks on FHP Records.

== Track listing ==
All tracks are written by Traditional (arranged by Franciscus Henri), unless otherwise shown.

No.	Title	Length
1.	"It's Raining" (Franciscus Henri (aka Franciscus Antheunis))
2.	"Singing in the Rain"
3.	"Water in My Shoes"
4.	"The Large Umbrella (Silly Billy Blunder)"
5.	"Sunshine Rainbows and Violins"
6.	"Ducks Like Rain"
7.	"Five Little Ducks"
8.	"Lots of Animals"
9.	"Hey De Ho (The Elephant)"
10.	"Jimmy Monkey (The Monkey)"
11.	"The Monkey Band"
12.	"Five Little Frogs"
13.	"Mr. Frog"
14.	"Three Little Sparrows"
15.	"Swinging on a Star"
16.	"Barnacle Bill"
17.	"I Saw a Ship"
18.	"Happy Sad Song"
19.	"When I Was Five"
20.	"Down by the Station"
21.	"Bessie the Steam Train"
22.	"Piggy on the Railway"
23.	"When the Train Comes"
24.	"Little Red Car Song"
25.	"I Have a Dolly"
26.	"Hush-a-Bye"
27.	"Miss Polly"
28.	"The Oogoo Tree"
