= Thumbelina (Frank Loesser song) =

Song by Danny Kaye

from the album Hans Christian Andersen
- Released: November 25, 1952
- Recorded: 1951
- Studio: Pythian Temple (New York City, New York)
- Genre: Showtune, Children's music
- Length: 1:50
- Label: Frank Music Corp; Decca Records
- Composer: Frank Loesser
- Producer: Samuel Goldwyn Productions

"Thumbelina" is a show tune from the 1952 film Hans Christian Andersen written by American songwriter Frank Loesser and performed by Danny Kaye. It was nominated for the Academy Award for Best Original Song at the 25th Academy Awards.

== Background ==
The song is based on the titular character of Danish fairy tale Thumbelina, who is the size of a thumb. In the song, a morose Thumbelina is encouraged to sing and dance ("Thumbelina dance, Thumbelina sing") despite being a "tiny little thing", and when her "heart is full of love" she becomes "nine feet tall".

According to Susan Loesser, the daughter of Frank Loesser, her father didn't have much regard for this song, referring to it as an "insignificant little ditty, not a real song", where he would use this song as an example when it came to poor music, whether his own or someone else's. Loesser never gave himself much credit for this song, although the song was created in a way it was meant to be – A "little ditty" that is aimed to entertain a young child.

=== Composition ===
The song is written in the key of D major with a tempo of 100 beats per minute (although the tempo in the actual record plays at 132 BPM). It features the use of a ninth chord, major seventh chord and as well as a diminished chord.

== Covers ==
- It was also recorded in 1952 by Jimmy Boyd, accompanied by The Norman Luboff Choir, as the B-side to his hit single “I Saw Mommy Kissing Santa Claus”.
- Roger Snoeck has produced an instrumental version of the song in 1953.
- It was part of a medley performed by conductor Arthur Fiedler in 1963.
- Canadian singer-lyricist Raffi covered the song in 1982, which appears in his album Rise and Shine. Having a polka influence, the song features backup vocals by a children's choir and instrumental music by Ken Whiteley, in addition to having a tempo of 102 BPM, slower than the original.
- ABC Kids covered this song in 2010 along with Scott Alplin and Phil Barton, and posted it on YouTube in 2021. In the early May of 2024, a viral video was posted on TikTok featuring a 3-year-old girl soloing the song by first jumping from a chair and then dancing on the stage. Other users would then post videos of themselves or their friends making their own solos of the song.
