= The Best of Franciscus Henri =

Compilation album by Franciscus Henri
- Released: 2002
- Recorded: Melbourne, Australia
- Genre: Children's
- Producer: Franciscus Henri

Franciscus Henri chronology
Board of Studies "Street Sense" – Road Safety Songs (1999)	The Best of Franciscus Henri (2002)	Explorer Semester One (2003)

The Best of Franciscus Henri is a children's album released in 2002, under ABC Music's ABC For Kids label on compact disc.

== Track listing ==
1. "White Pyjamas" (F. Henri)
2. "Zoo in My House" (S. Browne)
3. "Taking Us to The Carnival" (F. Henri)
4. "Five Coconuts" (F. Henri)
5. "Baked Beans" (F. Henri)
6. "Walking on The Milkyway" (F. Henri)
7. "Little Red Car Song" (F. Henri)
8. "Happy, Sad Song" (I.Catchlove - F. Henri)
9. "Give My Things Back" (F. Henri)
10. "Doctor, Doctor" (F. Henri)
11. "Dancing in The Kitchen" (F. Henri)
12. "Five Currant Buns" (F. Henri)
13. "Silly Billy" (F. Henri)
14. "I’m Hans Christian Andersen"
15. "Bag of Lollies" (F. Henri)
16. "Three Little Sparrows" (F. Henri)
17. "Piggy on The Railway" (trad - F. Henri)
18. "Bessie The Steam Train" (I.Catchlove - F. Henri)
19. "Old Tin Can" (F. Henri)
