= Dancing in the Kitchen =

Studio album by Franciscus Henri
- Released: 24 October 1991
- Studio: Sully Studios and Sing Sing, Melbourne
- Genre: Children's
- Label: Franciscus Henri

Franciscus Henri chronology
White Pyjamas (1991)	Dancing in the Kitchen (1991)	Walking on the Milky Way (1992)

Dancing in the Kitchen is an album by Franciscus Henri and was released in 1991 under ABC Music (ABC For Kids) on compact disc. At the ARIA Music Awards of 1992, it received a nomination for Best Children's Album. The music video for the title track, "Dancing in the Kitchen", was compiled into ABC for Kids Video Hits Volume 2, a various artists' video released in 1992.

== Track listing ==
1. "Happy Feet" (F.Henri)
2. "Dancing in the Kitchen" (F.Henri)
3. "Silly Billy" (F.Henri)
4. "Weekends"
5. "I'll Tell My Ma"
6. "Why's It Always Me?" (I. Catchlove, F.Henri)
7. "Sea Dreams"
8. "Five Currant Buns" (F.Henri)
9. "Mix a Pancake" (F.Henri)
10. "Flim Flam" (F.Henri)
11. "On the Sunny Side of the Street"
12. "Paintbox" (S.Brown, F.Henri)
13. "Hungry Song"
14. "Pizza Song" (F.Henri)
15. "Sha La, La, La Hello" (F.Henri)
16. "Big Umbrella"
17. "Mahogany Ship" (F.Henri)
18. "The Sneezing Fisherman"
19. "Bad Captain Shark" (I. Catchlove, F.Henri)
20. "Freight Train (F.Henri)
21. "It's Only a Paper Moon"
22. Going to the Circus" (F.Henri)
23. "Circus Band"
24. "Clowns"
25. "Clean the House" (I. Catchlove, F.Henri)
26. "Calypso Cat"
27. "Busy Day" (F.Henri)
28. "Autumn Leaves" (F.Henri)
29. "Yume Miru Hito" (F.Henri)
30. "Star Bright Lullaby"
