= Homily on the Crucifixion and the Good Thief =

The Homily on the Crucifixion and the Good Thief is a classic of Coptic literature written by Patriarch Theophilus I of Alexandria (385–412).
