= Walking on the Milky Way (album) =

Studio album by Franciscus Henri
- Released: 16 April 1992
- Recorded: Sully Studios Melbourne
- Genre: Children's music
- Length: 59:32
- Label: Franciscus Henri/ABC

Franciscus Henri chronology
| Dancing in the Kitchen (1991) | Walking on the Milky Way (1992) | Merry Christmas (1993) |

Walking on the Milky Way was released in April 1992 by Franciscus Henri, under ABC Music's ABC for Kids sub-label, as his sixth album. It received a nomination for Best Children's Album at the ARIA Music Awards of 1993. The music video for the title track, "Walking on the Milky Way", was compiled into ABC for Kids Video Hits Volume 2, a various artists' video released the same year.

== Track listing ==
1. Hello (S Browne)
2. Walking on The Milky Way (F. Henri)
3. Oopy Goopy (F. Henri)
4. I Can't Sit Still (F. Henri)
5. Little Lily Lilly Legs (F. Henri)
6. Water in My Shoes (F. Henri)
7. Here Comes That Day (F. Henri)
8. Ducks Like Rain (F. Henri)
9. Oh Sophia (F. Henri)
10. Monkey Band (I. Catchlove, F. Henri)
11. Oogoo tree (F. Henri)
12. Friday Night (S. Browne)
13. Oold Dark House (I. Catchlove, F. Henri)
14. Doctor, Doctor (F.Henri)
15. Happy, Sad Song (F.Henri)
16. Little Red Car Song (I. Catchlove, F. Henri)
17. Give My Things Back (F. Henri)
18. Don't You Wish You Were a Cowboy Too (F. Henri)
19. Junk (S. Browne)
20. Four Rubbish Bins (F. Henri)
21. My Back Yard
22. River Boat
23. Pelican Pete (F. Henri)
24. Going Fishing (AJ Leonard)
25. Jumping Jack
26. Teddy Bear
27. Wooden Heart
