= Nothing Fixed or Final =

Studio album by Franciscus Henri
- Released: 2005
- Label: Franciscus Henri Productions

Franciscus Henri chronology
Maestro Semester Two (2004)	Nothing Fixed or Final (2005)

Nothing Fixed or Final, released in 2005 under Franciscus Henri Productions, is a collection of songs and poems written by poet Sydney Carter, performed by Franciscus Henri.

== Track listing ==
=== Songs ===
1. The Candle Light
2. Bell of Creation
3. My Mum was a Woman
4. Silver in The Stubble
5. Mixed-up Old Man
6. Coming and Going Away
7. Green Like The Leaves
8. Feeling Sad and Lonely
9. Creator of The Living
10. Crow on The Cradle
11. Bird of Heaven
12. Shake and Shiver
13. Lord of The Dance
14. Come Holy Harlequin
15. The Devil
16. Every Star Shall Sing a Carol
17. Travel on
18. Julian of Norwich

=== Poems ===
1. Run The Film Backwards
2. Child
3. The Burden
4. The Rat Race
5. The Sin of Being
6. Anonymous
7. Interview
