= Teboho Mokoena =

Teboho Mokoena may refer to three South African soccer players:

- Teboho Mokoena (born 1974)
- Teboho Mokoena (born 1997)
- Aaron Mokoena (born 1980), South African former footballer
