= White Pyjamas =

Studio album by Franciscus Henri
- Released: 10 January 1991
- Recorded: Essex Street Studios Sydney
- Genre: Children's music
- Label: Franciscus Henri
- Producer: Franciscus Henri

Franciscus Henri chronology
Tree House (1988)	White Pyjamas (1991)	Dancing in the Kitchen (1991)

White Pyjamas is a studio album performed and produced by Franciscus Henri. It was released in 1991 under ABC Music (ABC For Kids) on compact disc. The music video for the title track, "White Pyjamas", was compiled into ABC for Kids Video Hits, a various artists video released the same year.

== Track listing ==
1. White Pyjamas (F.Henri)
2. Zoo In My House (S Browne)
3. Holiday (S Browne)
4. Pineapple Jack (S Browne)
5. My Uncle's A Sailor (S Browne)
6. Come Cycling (F.Henri)
7. Lizzie Come Out And Play (F.Henri)
8. Five Coconuts (F.Henri)
9. Shopping List (S Browne)
10. 18th Egg Overture (F.Henri)
11. Taking Us To The Carnival (F.Henri)
12. Merry-Go-Round (S Browne)
13. Merry-Go-Round The World (S Browne)
14. Catch A Falling Star
15. Captain Snowball (F.Henri)
16. Baked Beans (F.Henri)
17. Bedroom Window (F.Henri)
18. Kite Song (F.Henri)
19. Dance With The Dolly (Eaton/Leader/Shand)
20. Where Does The Moon Go? (S Browne)
