= It Was on a Friday Morning =

Song by Sydney Carter

- by Sydney Carter
- Key: C-sharp minor
- Year: c. 1959
- Meter: Irregular
- Melody: Friday Morning

"It Was on a Friday Morning", sometimes called "Friday Morning", is a song by Sydney Carter about the crucifixion of Jesus. It is written from the perspective of the Thief on the Cross, who blames God for the injustice of the situation with ironic lyrics such as "It's God they ought to crucify / Instead of you and me, / I said to the carpenter / A-hanging on the tree." Citing lines like "To hell with Jehovah," critics branded the song blasphemous; controversies arose on several occasions, most notably when it was included in the 1974 government-published Book of Worship for United States Forces. In that instance, congressmen demanded the song's removal, and conservative Christian groups organized mass letter-writing campaigns against it. The military chaplains responsible for the hymnal resisted these calls, which they viewed as demands for censorship that threatened the separation of church and state and their independence from political pressure. The song was not excised from most copies of the hymnal, although it was replaced in subsequent printings. For his part, Carter saw "Friday Morning" as "a device to make something happen" rather than a hymn appropriate for congregational singing.

== Background and content ==
Sydney Carter was an English songwriter who played a significant role in the folk revival of the 1960s and 70s. He is known for religious songs (most notably "Lord of the Dance") and protest tunes that convey strong social or political messages. Carter regularly attended an Anglican church but never sought "to hide the fact that his own faith was often frail", according to an obituary in The Times; he doubted church doctrines and found inspiration in Eastern philosophy. His religious music used satire and irony to express both faith and doubt, often resisting conservative tendencies in Christianity.

It Was on a Friday Morning
The refrain of "Friday Morning", sung by the group Reflection

"It Was on a Friday Morning" was first sung in 1959 at Cecil Sharp House. It is written from the perspective of the penitent thief who the Bible says was crucified beside Jesus. The thief reflects on the injustice of an innocent Jesus's crucifixion and blames God for allowing it, saying that responsibility rests not with the Devil, Pilate, the Jews, or original sin—but rather with the all-powerful God whose plan for the world contained such a wrong. The fourth verse and refrain are as follows:

To hell with Jehovah,
To the carpenter I said,
I wish that a carpenter
Had made the world instead.
Goodbye and good luck to you,
Our ways will soon divide. (Note: Alternatively "The road will soon divide.")
Remember me in heaven,
The man you hung beside.

Refrain: It's God they ought to crucify
Instead of you and me,
I said to the carpenter
A-hanging on the tree.

The irony stems from the Christian belief that the carpenter being crucified was God.

Carter described "Friday Morning" as "probably the most religious song I've ever written". He wrote that it was "not a hymn" but instead "a device to make something happen". Its real meaning, he felt, was not in the words themselves: "it is a negative, from which to print a positive...the carol is (or could be) in the silent part, sounding in the listener." He asked listeners to consider what Jesus might have said to the thief in response.

== Reception ==
For the English hymnologist Erik Routley, "Friday Morning" – a "theological exploration that opens up a terrifying vision of the real source of human grievance" – was "without question" Carter's greatest song. The theologian N. T. Wright wrote that it was among his finest works. The Methodist academic Gordon Wakefield, referring to the lines "I wish that a carpenter / Had made the world instead", said they "pierce to the marrow. One could pause on them for hours."

But "Friday Morning" was most noteworthy for the criticism it faced. Paul Oestreicher wrote that as a young producer, he "had to fight the BBC management" in order to air the song. The issuance of Donald Swann's 1964 record Songs of Faith and Doubt, which included "Friday Morning", was delayed for more than a year out of concern that the lyrics were blasphemous. The song's use in a youth songbook published by the World Council of Churches led to criticism in the United States; a 1968 editorial in a Kentucky newspaper reprinted the lyrics and asked: "Would you look forward to having your children or grandchildren singing this blasphemy at a church camp or conference?" A representative of the Council responded that it was intended "to arouse thought" about the question of why God allows evil. In 1972, a parent aggrieved by the Kidbrooke School's use of a hymnbook containing the song wrote to Enoch Powell, who vowed to pursue the matter with the Inner London Education Authority. Later that year, the Church of Scotland's General Assembly narrowly voted against giving its endorsement to a songbook containing "Friday Morning"; an opponent said it "would cause confusion and distress...no matter how exquisite the irony may be to enlightened spirits", while a supporter said the line "to hell with Jehovah" had been taken out of context.

=== Book of Worship for United States Forces controversy ===
The Book of Worship for United States Forces was a hymnal for the United States military prepared at the direction of the Armed Forces Chaplains Board. It contained 611 songs drawn from a range of religious traditions. A task force of chaplains voted five to one in 1970 to include "It Was on a Friday Morning"; in a 1971 internal memorandum, the executive director of the Chaplains Board defended the selection, writing that "if we remove hymns from the manuscript because they are objectionable to one or another of the involved religious denominations, we are going to have a thin hymnal indeed!" The hymnal was published in December 1974, with Carter's song included in the Lent section as hymn 286.

Some reviews of the hymnal in early 1975 expressed discomfort with the selection. J. Edward Moyer, a Methodist professor of church music, contended that the song could have "no salutary effect on any human soul", asking: "Can any congregation worship with such blasphemous words as 'To hell with Jehovah'?" And Routley questioned whether the song "is wisely included as a congregational hymn, great though it is". In a 1975 bulletin published by the United States Air Force's Chaplain Board, James W. Chapman sought to defend what he labeled "the most controversial hymn in the book". According to Chapman, it raised meaningful questions about the Crucifixion and spoke to important Christian truths; in the chorus, he said, the thief "stumbles onto the glorious solution. God is being crucified instead of you and me! That is the Gospel!"

Senator Strom Thurmond complained about the hymn's inclusion to Secretary of Defense James Schlesinger in the fall of 1975, but most opposition did not arise until mid-1976. In a June 4, 1976, speech in the House of Representatives, John T. Myers, a Republican congressman from Indiana, denounced the "so-called hymn" and urged listeners to write to the President about it, saying that "we should be on our knees praying for our country" if the Chaplains Board "has reached this low." Later that month, Myers called for the hymnal to be withdrawn from use until the "blasphemous" song was removed. Conservative Christian organizations initiated letter-writing campaigns against the hymn, and several congressmen's wives joined the effort. The wife of Melvin Price, an Illinois Democrat who chaired the House Armed Services Committee, said the song "could very well be used for a black mass"; her husband initiated an inquiry. Some opponents called for the song to be cut out of the hymnal with razor blades, and congressmen said it was "blasphemous and offensive" (William Hughes) and "composed in a spirit of hate" (Jim Collins). By July 2, the Chaplains Board had reconvened the task force and asked it to investigate the concerns.

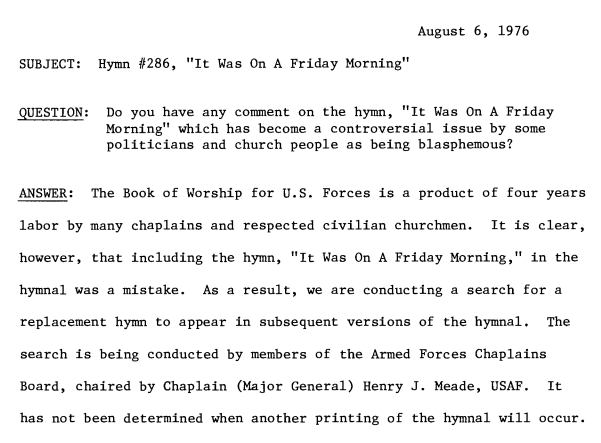
Excerpt from a Department of Defense briefing book used by Gerald Ford to prepare for the second 1976 presidential debate

On July 9, the chief chaplain of the Veterans Administration, James Rogers, issued a memorandum ordering: "Hymn No. 286 shall be removed from all new Books of Worship within 24 hours." In comments to the press, he described Carter's song as "sacrilegious" and inappropriate for "a hospital where there are sick people." Rogers defended himself against accusations of censorship by saying that "there's nobody in the world more liberal than I am." He said the decision was entirely his own, but Henry J. Meade, the Air Force Chief Chaplain, later claimed that Rogers was acting on an order from the agency's administrator. To comply with Rogers's order, chaplains at some of the 71 affected VA hospitals cut the hymn out, while others covered it with adhesive paper; one blotted the words out with a marker. Cutting out the song's two pages also removed some or all of four other hymns, including "There Is a Green Hill Far Away", a favorite of religious conservatives. Rogers's decision sparked protest from mainline denominations: an official of the United Church of Christ said that the VA had "crumbled before the petty religious opinions of the politically powerful", while a representative of the American Baptist Churches criticized what he described as government censorship. The former threatened a class-action lawsuit for First Amendment violations and defacement of government property. The order applied only to the VA, and Myers insisted that the Department of Defense too needed to ban the hymn.

In a July 20 memorandum, Meade wrote that it would damage the "delicate two-institution foundation" of the military chaplaincy if the Department of Defense overrode the "church side" on a purely theological matter, although he indicated a willingness to make revisions in later editions. Secretary of Defense Donald Rumsfeld said in a July 23 letter to Myers that the song's inclusion had been a mistake and that it would be replaced in subsequent printings. A Pentagon spokesman announced in late August that the hymn would not be removed from hymnals already printed. That November, Meade announced that in deference to "the great number of sincere individuals offended by its presence, this hymn will not be included in subsequent editions of the Book of Worship". In 1977, "Are Ye Able" by Earl Marlatt was selected as the replacement hymn; it was included in a second printing that year.

Over the course of the controversy, the Department of Defense received 15,000 letters objecting to "It Was on a Friday Morning", including from at least 49 members of Congress. An October 1976 article in The Saturday Evening Post quipped that the song was "almost as explicit as Matthew, Mark and Luke" and suggested that "if Congress is concerned with morality, Congressmen should start with themselves". Carter said that until he was told his song was being removed, "I didn't even know it was there". Speaking in 1978, Meade said he had been "absolutely correct" to resist political pressure to excise the hymn. In 1993, the church music professor Don Hustad described the incident as "an example of a communication gap caused by the failure to distinguish between imagination-stirring art and functional church music"; he saw the song (which was not included in any later hymnals) as theologically sound but poorly suited for congregational use. The scholar Jacqueline E. Whitt wrote in a 2014 book that the controversy illustrated how rising conservative influence on the military could clash with an institutional chaplaincy committed to pluralism and ecumenism.
