= Sydney Carter =

English poet and songwriter (1915–2004)

Sydney Bertram Carter (6 May 1915 – 13 March 2004) was an English poet, songwriter, and folk musician. He is best known for the song "Lord of the Dance" (1963), whose music is based on the Shaker song "Simple Gifts", and for the song "The Crow on the Cradle", which was recorded by Jackson Browne and used on the soundtrack to the film In the King of Prussia (1983) and No Nukes (1980).

His other notable songs include "Julian of Norwich" (sometimes called "The Bells of Norwich"), based on words of Julian of Norwich, "One More Step Along the World I Go", "When I Needed a Neighbour", "Friday Morning", "Every Star Shall Sing a Carol", "The Youth of the Heart", "Down Below", "Sing John Ball" and "Walk In The Light" (a Quaker song also known as “The Ballad of George Fox song”) (1964).

== Biography ==
Born in Camden Town, London, Carter was educated at Montem Street Primary School in Finsbury Park, before winning a scholarship to Christ's Hospital school in Horsham, West Sussex. He read Modern History at Balliol College, Oxford, graduating in 1936.

He taught at Frensham Heights School in Surrey. A committed pacifist, he registered as a conscientious objector in the Second World War and joined the Friends' Ambulance Unit. He served in Egypt, Palestine and Greece alongside Donald Swann, who became a friend and collaborator.

In 1952 he married Natalia Benckendorff, a Russian emigre from St Petersburg. She died soon afterwards in a climbing accident on Minorca.

In 1964 he married his second wife Leela Nair, with whom he had a son, the neurosurgeon Michael Carter. He died in March 2004 aged 88, having suffered Alzheimer's disease since 1999.

== Career ==
Carter worked as a lyricist for Donald Swann's revues and musicals in the 1950s and in 1962 produced an album, Putting out the Dustbin, with Sheila Hancock. "Last Cigarette", a song from the album about failing to give up smoking became a minor hit. In 1968, rock band Reflection released The Present Tense (Songs of Sydney Carter), incorporating his poetry and songs.

In 1972, a collection of his poems, Love More or Less, was described in a review by Michael Grosvenor Myer in the EFDSS magazine English Dance and Song as the work of "an impressive spokesman for the believer in an age of general unbelief".

He continued to work with Donald Swann, writing six songs for the 1964 Swann EP, Songs of Faith and Doubt. In the 1960s he also worked as a critic for Gramophone magazine. In 1965 Carter wrote the six-song EP album Lord of the Dance with Martin Carthy on guitar, the Johnny Scott Trio and the Mike Sammes singers. He also worked with Nadia Cattouse and Jeremy Taylor.

In 1972 Carter presented a series of concerts in Australia. Franciscus Henri who accompanied him recorded an anthology of Carter's songs and poems (Nothing Fixed or Final) in 2005. Also in 1972, Bob and Carole Pegg recorded a collection of his songs with him, And Now It Is So Early.

In 1981, a collection of English folk musicians released Lovely in the Dances, a compilation of his songs. Performers included Shusha, Maddy Prior and John Kirkpatrick.

== Bibliography ==
- Nothing Fixed or Final (1969)
- Love More or Less (1971)
- The Two-Way Clock (Nothing Fixed or Final and Love More or Less with 29 additional poems (1974)
- The Rock of Doubt (1978)
- Dance in the Dark (1980)
