= Ding Dong Who Rang the Bell =

Ding Dong Who Rang the Bell?

Studio album by Franciscus Henri
- Released: 1972
- Recorded: Armstrong Studios, South Melbourne
- Genre: Folk
- Length: 29:15
- Label: Fable
- Producer: Franciscus Henri

Franciscus Henri chronology
Ding Dong Who Rang the Bell? (1972)	Gabriel's Mother's Highway (1972)

Ding Dong Who Rang the Bell is the debut album by Franciscus Henri, released in 1972 by Fable Records, on 33 rpm vinyl record. Henri himself painted the album's jacket and he recorded the album at top Melbourne studio Armstrong Studios, who by now had relocated to 180 Bank Street, South Melbourne and had taken over a former butter factory.

== Track listing ==
No.	Title	Writer(s)	Length
1.	"How Have You Been?"	John Sebastian
2.	"When I First Came to This Land"	Oscar Brand
3.	"Don Gato"	Jeffrey Leask
4.	"Lavender Blue"	Traditional
5.	"Sun Magic"	Donovan Leitch
6.	"Hairy Scary"	Leask
7.	"Ding Dong Who Rang the Bell"	Hans Poulsen, Bruce Woodley
8.	"The Fox"	Traditional, Franciscus Henri (aka Franciscus Antheunis)
9.	"Fiddle Dee, Dee"	Leask
10.	"Swim Little Fish"	Leask
11.	"The Turtle"	Lindsay, Hague
12.	"Tick Tock"	Henri

== Personnel ==
- Franciscus Henri - vocals, guitar
- Geoff Cox - drums, percussion, quacking
- Rick Berger - bass
- Phil Gardiner - guitar
- Nick Alexander - keyboards, recorder
