= Thabo Moloi =

South African soccer player

Personal information
- Full name: Thabo Joy Moloi
- Date of birth: 23 March 1994 (age 32)
- Place of birth: Vereeniging, South Africa
- Position: Right back

Team information
- Current team: JDR Stars

Youth career
- 2006–2012: SuperSport United

Senior career*
Years	Team	Apps	(Gls)
2013–2017	SuperSport United	45	(0)
2015–2016	→ AmaZulu (loan)	17	(0)
2016–2017	→ Tuks (loan)	9	(0)
2019–2021	Pretoria Callies	40	(0)
2022–	JDR Stars	1	(0)
- * Club domestic league appearances and goals as of 1 August 2022

Thabo Joy Moloi (born 23 March 1994) is a South African soccer player who plays for JDR Stars as a defender.

== Club career ==
Moloi joined the SuperSport United academy in 2006 and was promoted to the first-team squad in January 2013. He made his league debut against Orlando Pirates on 13 February 2013. Moloi was awarded the club's Young Player of the Season award for the 2013–14 season.
