= Lerato Moloi =

South African fashion model

- Born: 13 January 1985 (age 40); Limpopo River
- Citizenship: South Africa
- Occupation(s): Model, Actor, Television producer, Entrepreneur, Film director

Lerato Moloi is a South African fashion model who, in 2009, became the first black face for the cosmetics brand Elizabeth Arden. Initially, Moloi had been interested in psychology, but after visiting a modeling agency with her mother and younger sister, she became interested in modeling. Her modeling career officially began at the age of 17 and her first professional photo shoot was for Elle Magazine.

Controversy erupted in 2000 when a New York modeling agency told Moloi that she needed to lose weight before modeling. The incident sparked international debate over the use of underweight models in the Fashion Industry.

Moloi told BBC News, "Young girls in Africa are increasingly concerned with being thin-the more exposed we are to western media-the more we buy into". In 2002, she participated in the M-Net Face of Africa pageant and became a finalist.

Moloi modeled for Elizabeth Arden's "Eight Hour Cream"skin care line. As the first black face for Elizabeth Arden, Moloi has stated that she wants to dispel the myth that UV protection is not essential for women of color.

Moloi was a contestant on Celebrity MasterChef South Africa in 2015.

== Personal life ==
Moloi was married to Sibusiso Hlatshwayo, her longtime boyfriend from high school, for a year before their divorce in 2011. She has 1 child with him, Muhle, born in 2010, and her eldest child from a previous relationship, is Keoratile.

In July 2020, Moloi was reportedly arrested for being in contempt of court after she refused to remove a tweet in which she alleged she had been sexually assaulted by three men, one of whom she named was comedian Mongezi "Tol Ass Mo" Ngcobondwane. Ngcobondwane reportedly took legal action and she was ordered by the court to remove the tweet. On 19 June she had tweeted: "Moment's ago, I've just signed for & received the lawyer's letters of demand, interim protection order; etc, from the man that raped me in 2014. I am still not afraid! I will not go silent!".Toll Ass Mo was later vindicated and acquitted of the false charges laid against him by lerato moloi, who has since not apologized for the false claims laid against him.
