= Teboho Moloi =

South African soccer player and manager

Personal information
- Full name: Teboho Claude Moloi
- Date of birth: 2 July 1968 (age 58)
- Place of birth: Soweto, South Africa
- Position: Midfielder

Senior career*
Years	Team	Apps	(Gls)
1987–1997	Orlando Pirates	159	(33)
1993–1994	Gaziantepspor	15	(1)
1995–1996	Once Caldas	18	(5)

International career
1993	South Africa	2	(0)

Managerial career
- 2011–2016: Orlando Pirates (assistant)
- 2016–2017: Buya Msuthu FC
- 2017: Chippa United (assistant)
- 2017–2018: Chippa United (caretaker)
- 2020–2022: Linare F.C.
- * Club domestic league appearances and goals

Teboho Moloi (born 2 July 1968) is a South African professional soccer manager and former player who managed the South Africa U17 national team. He is the son of former footballer Percy “Chippa” Moloi.

== Club career ==
Moloi spent most of his career playing as a midfielder for Orlando Pirates. He had a spell with Gaziantepspor in the Turkish Süper Lig during the 1993–94 season and a spell with Once Caldas in 1995 and 1996, where he became the first South African to score a goal in the Colombian top flight.

== International career ==
Moloi appeared in two matches for the senior South Africa national team during 1993.

== Coaching career ==
Moloi coached Linare F.C. of Lesotho from 2020 until 2022, when he instead took up an advisory role at the club. He had left that position by October 2022.
