= ABC Commercial =

Commercial arm of the Australian Broadcasting Corporation

- Type: Division
- Industry: Media
- Predecessor: ABC Enterprises
- Founded: 1974; 52 years ago
- Headquarters: Sydney, Australia
- Parent: Australian Broadcasting Corporation
- Website: abc.net.au/commercial

ABC Commercial, formerly ABC Enterprises Limited, is the revenue-earning division of the Australian Broadcasting Corporation, one of the two national public broadcasters. ABC Commercial has operated in various forms since its establishment in 1974, with its primary purpose to generate income for the ABC, which is then invested in content production.

The national network of retail ABC Shops closed down in 2015, with the digital and few remaining brick-and-mortar retail sites having been retired at the end of 2018. ABC Commercial continues to do business in content sales and distribution; music and events; publishing and licensing; and the ABC Studios and Media Production.

== History of the organisation ==
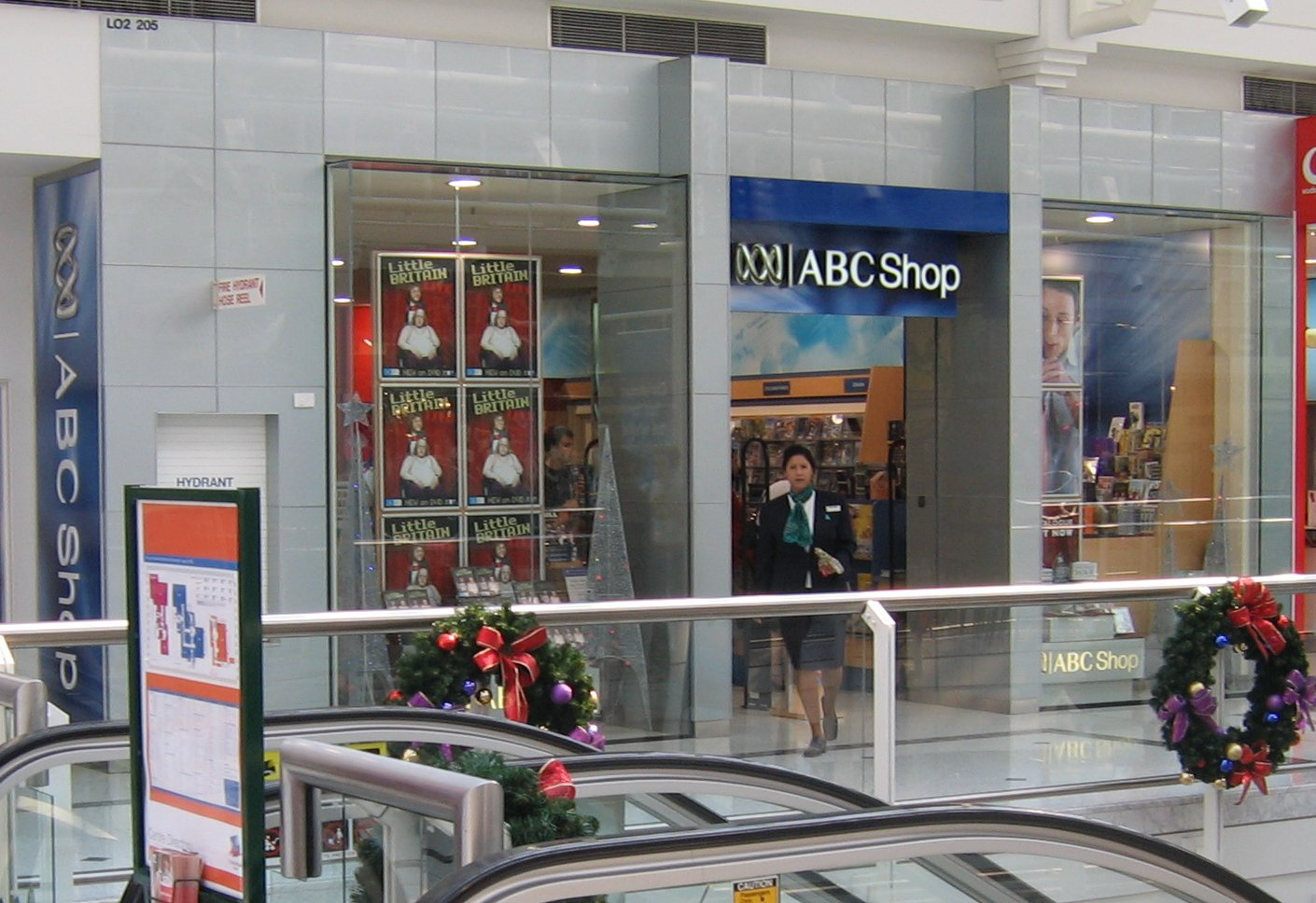
ABC Shop in Charlestown Square, Charlestown, New South Wales, 2006

The commercial arm of the ABC was established in 1974 under the name ABC Enterprises as a self-funding unit, marketing products relating to the ABC's activities. It was renamed in 2007 to ABC Commercial, with the former director of New Media and Digital Services, Lynley Marshall, appointed as director of the new division, which would investigate new avenues to earn revenue in digital technology.

The aim of the renamed division was "to create, market and retail high quality consumer products which reflect and extend the scope of the ABC’s activities". At this time it comprised the ABC Shop, ABC Consumer Publishing and Content Sales (which included various sales, events, and licensing operations), ABC Resource Hire (costumes and minicam), and ABC Content Services (Archives).

ABC Commercial was registered as a business name under Australian Broadcasting Corporation on the Australian Business Register in April 2007, and continues to exist as of June 2021, along with ABC Shop, ABC Music Publishing, ABC Young Performers' Award and Happy Body at Work as other business names.

Until early 2019, ABC Commercial was part of the Finance division; it then became an independent business unit of the ABC.

== Description ==
ABC Commercial's primary purpose is to generate income for the ABC through the sale of ABC and third-party content and intellectual property. It creates, licenses, and markets both physical and digital products globally through its business divisions as well as its own business affairs, rights clearance, royalties and finance support functions.

ABC Commercial is fully self-financed through its operations and does not receive public funding.

In the financial year 2018–2019, ABC Commercial turned a profit of A$4.4 million, which was invested in content production. Of its gross revenue, 54.5% of its revenue came from sales of ABC content, 23.8% from music 9.4% from investment agencies, 6.2% from studio and media production and 5.7% from publishing.

== Business units ==
As of 2021 the main business units of ABC Commercial are: Content Sales, Content Acquisitions, ABC Music, Events, ABC Studios and Media Production, ABC Books and Magazines, and ABC Library Sales.

These units are grouped by activities as: ABC Content Sales and Distribution; ABC Music and Events; ABC Publishing and Licensing; ABC Studios and Media Production; and ABC Retail.

=== ABC Retail ===
ABC Shops were managed under the ABC Retail department. ABC Shops operated over 40 retail shops and 80 centres, an international delivery service on the internet as well as developing and licensing ABC brands and programs, and providing production resource hire to the general public and industry alike.

The national network of ABC Shops closed down late 2015 and moved to an online only model, with the ABC Centre franchise network still operational within other retailers.

The continued decline of physical product sales as customers moved to digital consumption of content together with global competition in the retail sector led to the closure of the ABC Shop Online. In August 2018, Andrew Lambert, general manager of ABC Commercial, announced that ABC Shop Online would be wound up by the end of the year, and the in-store ABC Centres would also be closed, marking the end of ABC Retail.

The last ABC Centre franchises closed at the end of February 2019; licensed ABC products are still available from approved ABC retailers.

=== ABC Studios and Media Production ===
ABC Studios and Media Production existed as a separate business entity between 2015 and 2018. As of June 2021 the ABC Studios and Media Production website advertises "studios and sound stages available for hire across the country", operating as part of ABC Commercial. The studios for hire are in Sydney (Studios 21, 22, 16), Melbourne (31), Adelaide (51B) and Perth (61).

In Melbourne, the old Studio 31, known as the Ripponlea studio (although situated in Gordon Street in the adjoining suburb of Elsternwick in Melbourne) and nicknamed "The Dream Factory", closed in November 2017, after the new Studio 31 was relocated to the new refurbished ABC studios which had opened in August of that year in the Melbourne Arts Precinct in Southbank.
