= Timothy Moloi =

Background information
- Born: Kgutlisi Timothy Moloi; 15 August 1975 (age 51)
- Origin: Soweto, Gauteng, South Africa
- Genres: R&B, soul, adult contemporary
- Occupation: Singer
- Years active: 1999–present
- Label: Thatch Music (2009–2011)
- Website: Official website

Timothy Moloi (born 15 August 1975) is a South African singer and recording artist.

== Education ==
Schooled in South Africa, Timothy Moloi went on to complete a Bachelor of Arts degree at Ohio Wesleyan University in Delaware, Ohio, in the United States.

== Music career ==
Timothy Moloi has performed at the 16th South African Music Awards, Africa Day, at two Miss South Africa Pageants, at the Africa Peace Initiative Awards and at the Closing Ceremony of the 1999 All-Africa Games in Johannesburg, South Africa. He has also performed the National Anthem of South Africa at the Tri Nations Rugby and at the Send-Off telecast for the South Africa national rugby union team for the 2007 Rugby World Cup.

During the Earth Summit 2002, Timothy Moloi performed for former South African President Nelson Mandela, Graça Machel, Prince Willem-Alexander and Princess Máxima of the Netherlands.

Timothy Moloi released his debut solo album Love That Music in July 2009, which was recorded at Undahaus Studios in Johannesburg and mastered at Abbey Road Studios in London. In 2010, Love That Music was nominated for two South African Music Awards.

On 11 June 2010 he performed at the 2010 FIFA World Cup opening ceremony.

== Discography ==
=== Solo albums ===
- 2009: Love That Music
