= Big Red Car =

1995 studio album/video by The Wiggles

Studio album by the Wiggles
- Released: 1995 (AUS); 2001 (USA)
- Recorded: 1994–1995
- Studios: Tracking Station Studios and Struggle Street Studios
- Genre: Children's music
- Length: 35:38
- Labels: ABC, EMI Music Group Australasia (AUS); Lyrick Studios / Koch Records (USA)
- Producer: The Wiggles

The Wiggles chronology
Yummy Yummy (1994)	Big Red Car (1995)	Wake Up Jeff! (1996)

Big Red Car is the fifth album by Australian band the Wiggles, released in 1995 by ABC Music distributed by EMI. This album won the ARIA Award for Best Children's Album in 1995.

== Track listing ==
All tracks are written by (or trad. arr. by) Murray Cook, Jeff Fatt, Anthony Field, Greg Page except spoken or listed below.

No.	Title	Writer(s)	Length
1.	"Wags the Dog"	Cook, Fatt, Field, Page, John Field	2:42
2.	"Henry's Dance"		1:51
3.	"Five Little Joeys"		1:48
4.	"Can You (Point Your Fingers and Do the Twist?)"		1:34
5.	"Di Dicki Do Dum"		1:33
6.	"Cows" (spoken)		0:20
7.	"I'm a Cow"		0:31
8.	"Bouncing Ball" (spoken)		0:12
9.	"Brown Girl in the Ring"		1:35
10.	"Dorothy's Dance Party"	John Field	2:15
11.	"The Four Presents"		2:39
12.	"My Holiday at the Beach" (spoken)		0:10
13.	"On Your Holiday" (Not featured on the North American release)	Matthew Perry	1:33
14.	"Teddy Bear Hug" (Not featured on the North American release)	Raffi, Bonnie Simpson	1:55
15.	"Big Red Car"		1:49
16.	"My Hat" (spoken)		0:08
17.	"Hat on My Head"	Cook, Fatt, Field, Page, John Field	1:11
18.	"Here We Go Dorothy"		2:41
19.	"Do the Flap"	Cook, Fatt, Field, Page, John Field, Anthony Henry	2:26
20.	"Pufferbillies"		0:40
21.	"Joannie Works with One Hammer"		0:47
22.	"Nicky Nacky Nocky Noo"		1:14
23.	"My New Shoes"		0:42
24.	"I Am a Dancer"		0:58
25.	"Look at Baby" (spoken)		0:09
26.	"Georgia's Song"		0:43
27.	"Sanctissima"		0:45
Total length:			35:38

== Personnel ==
Adapted from the album booklet.

The Wiggles

- Murray Cook – vocals, bass, guitar, vibraslap
- Jeff Fatt – backing vocals, piano, Lowrey Colour Glow organ, vibraslap, lead vocal on "I'm a Cow"
- Anthony Field – vocals, acoustic guitar, vibraslap coordinator
- Greg Page – lead vocals, Hammond B-3, vibraslap

Additional musicians

- Terry Murray – guitar
- Tony Henry – drums on "Brown Girl in the Ring", "Big Red Car", "Five Little Joeys", "Can You.."
- Andrew Bignall – drums on "Wags the Dog", "Henry's Dance", "Hat on My Head", "Do the Flap", "Teddy Bear Hug"
- Greg Truman – backing vocals on "Wags the Dog", "Henry's Dance", "Do the Flap", "Hat on My Head", "Teddy Bear Hug"
- Gerry Brady – backing vocals on "The Four Presents" and guitar on "Pufferbillies"
- Emma Buter – Character voice
- John Field – sequencing and guitar on "Dorothy's Dance Party"

== Video ==
Big Red Car
- VHS cover
- Directed by: Phil Cullen
- Written by: The Wiggles
- Produced by: John Spence
- Starring: Greg Page; Anthony Field; Murray Cook; Jeff Fatt
- Music by: The Wiggles
- Distributed by: Roadshow Entertainment / ABC Video (#17128)
- Release date: 9 October 1995
- Running time: 40 minutes
- Country: Australia

Big Red Car was made into a video, released in 1995 by the Wiggles. It marks the first appearances of the Big Red Car and the S.S Feathersword, although they were merely cardboard props. This video also debuts Wags the Dog. In the United States, the video was marketed as Dance Party.

=== Songs and skits ===
1. Can You (Point Your Fingers and Do the Twist?)
2. Wags the Dog
3. Five Little Joeys
4. Di Dicki Do Dum
5. I'm a Cow
6. Do the Flap
7. On Your Holiday
8. Hat on My Head
9. Greg's Magic Show (The Magic Bag) (skit) (Note: The background songs played during Greg's Magic Show skit are a mashup of "Camptown Races" and "Long, Long Ago")
10. Brown Girl in the Ring
11. Georgia's Song
12. Our Boat is Rocking on the Sea
13. Nicky Nacky Nocky Noo
14. Dorothy's Dance Party
15. Big Red Car
16. Henry's Dance (Instrumental)

=== Cast ===
The Wiggles

- Murray Cook
- Jeff Fatt
- Anthony Field
- Greg Page

Also featuring

- Alex Harfield and Jacqui Field as Wags the Dog
- Emma Buter as Dorothy the Dinosaur
- Vanessa Fallon-Rohanna as Henry the Octopus
- Anthony, John, or Paul Field as Captain Feathersword (Note: Paul Field played Captain Feathersword in "Do the Flap" and the end credits and John William Field played him at "Dorothy's Dance Party".)
- Alex Harfield, Mary Ann Hull, Rhiannah Kitching as "Georgia's Song" Dancers

Choreography

- Leanne Halloran (Note: Halloran also played the girl pirate in "Our Boat Is Rocking on the Sea" and "Nicky Nacky Nocky Noo".)
- Assistants: Donna Halloran, Judy Halloran

=== Release ===
This video was released on VHS in 9 October 1995 in Australia, and 2001 to the United States. The DVD was released to the United States on 4 February 2003 under the title Dance Party. In 2018, the video was uploaded on the Wiggles' YouTube channel as the first part on 19 April, the second on 6 May, and the third on 17 May.

== Here Comes the Big Red Car ==
Here Comes the Big Red Car

Studio album by the Wiggles
- Released: 2006
- Recorded: 2005
- Studios: Tune Master Productions; Tracking Station Studios; Struggle Street Studios, Bellevue Hill, Sydney
- Genre: Children's music
- Label: ABC
- Producer: Anthony Field

The Wiggles chronology
Sailing Around the World (2005)	Here Comes the Big Red Car (2006)	It's Time to Wake Up Jeff! (2006)

Here Comes the Big Red Car is the 22nd album release from Australian children's music group the Wiggles. It contains tracks that were mostly recorded for the Big Red Car album.

=== Track listing ===
1. Big Red Car
2. Can You (Point Your Fingers and Do the Twist?)
3. Wags the Dog
4. Five Little Joeys
5. Di Dicki Do Dum
6. Brown Girl in the Ring
7. Sorry Again
8. Introduction
9. I'm A Cow
10. Do the Flap
11. Pufferbillies
12. Joannie Works with One Hammer
13. I Want to Wear the Jacket
14. Introduction
15. Hat on My Head
16. The Four Presents
17. Introduction
18. Georgia's Song
19. I am a Dancer
20. Our Boat is Rocking on the Sea
21. Nicky Nacky Nocky Noo
22. Dorothy's Dance Party
23. Henry's Dance
24. Sanctissima
25. Here We Go Dorothy
26. My New Shoes

== 2006 video ==
Here Comes the Big Red Car
- Directed by: Paul Field
- Produced by: Paul Field
- Starring: Greg Page; Anthony Field; Murray Cook; Jeff Fatt
- Edited by: Craig Abercrombie
- Music by: The Wiggles
- Distributed by: Roadshow Entertainment / ABC DVD
- Release date: 23 March 2006
- Running time: 70 minutes
- Country: Australia

The companion video was released in 2006. DVD extras include a song jukebox, photo gallery, electronic songbook, Dorothy the Dinosaur special announcements, and two episodes of "Lights, camera, action, Wiggles".

=== Song list ===
1. Big Red Car
2. Can You (Point Your Fingers and Do the Twist?)
3. Wags the Dog
4. Five Little Joeys
5. Di Dicki Do Dum
6. I'm a Cow – Wiggly Animation
7. Do the Flap
8. Hat on my Head
9. Brown Girl in the Ring
10. Georgia's Song
11. I Want to Wear the Jacket
12. Our Boat is Rocking on the Sea
13. Nicky Nacky Nocky Noo
14. Dorothy's Dance Party
15. Sorry Again
16. Henry's Dance

=== Personnel ===
- Vocals: Greg Page, Murray Cook, Jeff Fatt, Anthony Field, Paul Paddick, Emma Buter, Caterina Mete, Brett Clarke, Ryan De Saulnier and Sam Moran,
- Backing Vocals: Murray Cook, Jeff Fatt, Anthony Field, Kevin Bennett, Greg Truman and Gerry Brady
- Guitar: Murray Cook, Anthony Field, John Field, Gerry Brady and Terry Murray
- Bass: Murray Cook and Chris Lupton
- Keyboard: Jeff Fatt and Dominic Lindsay
- Piano Accordion: Dominic Lindsay
- Drums: Tony Henry and Andrew Bignall
- Bouzouki: George Tseros
