= Racing to the Rainbow =

2006 studio album/video by The Wiggles

Studio album by the Wiggles
- Released: 28 August 2006 (AUS); 13 March 2007 (US)
- Recorded: January 2006
- Studios: Tiger Sound, Sydney Australia
- Genre: Children's music
- Labels: ABC (AUS); Koch Records (US)
- Producer: Anthony Field

The Wiggles chronology
Splish Splash Big Red Boat (2006)	Racing to the Rainbow (2006)	Christmas Classics (2006)

Racing to the Rainbow is the 25th album by Australian children's music group The Wiggles. This album won the ARIA Award for Best Children's Album in 2006. It was also the last album to feature new material with Greg Page until Surfer Jeff in 2012.

== Track list ==
All tracks are written by (or trad arr. by) Murray Cook, Jeff Fatt, Anthony Field, Greg Page, except listed below.

No.	Title	Writer(s)	Length
1.	"Intro"
2.	"Here Come the Chicken"
3.	"Bump-a-Deedle"	Malvina Reynolds
4.	"Music Box Dancer"	Frank Mills
5.	"Shakin' Like a Leafy Tree"	Cook, Fatt, Field, Page, John Field, Dominic Lindsay
6.	"Teddy Bears' Big Day Out"	Cook, Fatt, Field, Page, John Field, Dominic Lindsay
7.	"Rainbow of Colours"	Cook, Fatt, Field, Page, John Field, Dominic Lindsay
8.	"Blow Up Your Balloon (Huff and Huff and Puff)"
9.	"The Chew Chew Song"	Cook, Fatt, Field, Page, Dominic Lindsay
10.	"The Princess of the Sea"	Cook, Fatt, Field, Page, Sam Moran, Brett Clarke
11.	"Polly Put the Kettle On"	(Trad arr) Cook, Fatt, Field, Page, John Field, Paul Paddick
12.	"Do the Daddy Long Legs"	Cook, Fatt, Field, Page, John Field, Dominic Lindsay
13.	"Stamp Your Feet (To the Heavy Beat)"	Cook, Fatt, Field, Page, John Field, Dominic Lindsay
14.	"He's a Bird! What a Bird!"	Cook, Fatt, Field, Page, John Field, Dominic Lindsay
15.	"The Tra-La-La Song"	Cook, Fatt, Field, Page, John Field, Dominic Lindsay
16.	"Huddle, Huddle, Huddle Along (The Football Song)"	Cook, Fatt, Field, Page, John Field, Dominic Lindsay
17.	"The Wheels on the Bus"
18.	"Go to Sleep Jeff (Brahms' Lullaby)"	Brahms/arr. Angela Lindsay, Dominic Lindsay, Margaret Lindsay, Maria Lindsay, Steve Machamer
19.	"Row, Row, Row Your Boat"
20.	"Rockin' on the Water"	Cook, Fatt, Field, Page, John Field, Paul Field
21.	"Five Little Ducks"
22.	"Everybody Dance!"	Cook, Fatt, Field, Page, John Field, Dominic Lindsay
23.	"Love Train"	Kenneth Gamble & Leon Huff

And on the DVD but not the CD:

- "Run, Run, Run Away (A Storm is on It's Way)"
- "Baa, Baa, Black Sheep"

== Video ==
Racing to the Rainbow
- Directed by: Paul Field
- Written by: Greg Truman
- Produced by: Paul Field
- Starring: Greg Page; Anthony Field; Murray Cook; Jeff Fatt; Paul Paddick; Kamahl; Georgie Parker; Smoky Dawson
- Edited by: Liam Donaghy; David Roberts
- Music by: The Wiggles
- Production company: The Wiggles Pty Ltd
- Distributed by: Roadshow/ABC DVD
- Release date: 7 September 2006
- Running time: 110 minutes
- Country: Australia

Racing to the Rainbow was released on ABC DVD in 2006.

=== Songs ===
1. "Here Come the Chicken"
2. "Bump-a-Deedle"
3. "Music Box Dancer"
4. "Shakin' Like a Leafy Tree"
5. "Run, Run, Run Away (A Storm is on It's Way)"
6. "Teddy Bears' Big Day Out"
7. "Rainbow of Colours"
8. "Blow Up Your Balloon (Huff and Huff and Puff)"
9. "The Chew Chew Song"
10. "The Princess of the Sea"
11. "Benny Put the Kettle On"
12. "Baa, Baa, Black Sheep"
13. "Stamp Your Feet (To the Heavy Beat)"
14. "He's a Bird! What a Bird!"
15. "Do the Daddy Long Legs"
16. "The Tra-La-La Song"
17. "Huddle, Huddle, Huddle Along (The Football Song)"
18. "The Wheels on the Bus"
19. "Go to Sleep Jeff (Brahms' Lullaby)"
20. "Row, Row, Row Your Boat"
21. "Rockin' on the Water"
22. "Five Little Ducks"
23. "Everybody Dance!"

=== Cast ===
The cast as listed on the video closing credits.

The Wiggles

- Greg Page
- Anthony Field
- Murray Cook
- Jeff Fatt

Also featuring

- Captain Feathersword: Paul Paddick
- Dorothy the Dinosaur: Lyn Moran and Clare Field
  - Voiceover: Zoe Velez
- Henry the Octopus: Katherine Patrick
  - Voiceover: Jeff Fatt
- Wags the Dog: Kristy Talbot
  - Voiceover: Mic Conway
- Magdalena the Mermaid: Larissa Wright
- King of the Road: Kamahl
- Smoky Dawson
- Queen of the Rainbow: Georgie Parker

== Tour ==
From 30 November 2006 – 18 November 2007 the Wiggles embarked on the Racing to the Rainbow Show tour in the USA, Europe and Australia. This tour introduced new yellow wiggle Sam Moran. Two of the shows in Australia were filmed for their DVD Wiggledancing Live in Concert.
