= Toot Toot! =

1998 studio album/video by The Wiggles

Studio album by the Wiggles
- Released: 1998
- Recorded: 1997
- Studios: Festival and Electric Avenue Studios, Sydney Australia
- Genre: Children's music
- Length: 43:09
- Labels: ABC, Lyrick Studios, Koch, Razor & Tie
- Producer: The Wiggles

The Wiggles chronology
The Wiggles Movie Soundtrack (1997)	Toot Toot! (1998)	It's a Wiggly Wiggly World (2000)

Toot Toot! is the ninth album by Australian band the Wiggles, released in 1998 by ABC Music distributed by EMI. It won the ARIA Award for Best Children's Album in 1998.

== Track listing ==
All tracks are written by (or trad. arr. by) The Wiggles except noted below

No.	Title	Writer(s)	Length
1.	"Toot Toot, Chugga Chugga, Big Red Car"		2:22
2.	"Look Both Ways"	Cook, Fatt, Field, Page, John Field	1:42
3.	"Dorothy the Dinosaur (Tell Me Who Is That Knocking?)"		1:24
4.	"Food Poem" (spoken)		0:12
5.	"Food Food Food (Oh How I Love My Food)"	John Field	2:08
6.	"John Bradlelum"		1:14
7.	"Captain Feathersword's Raincoat Story" (spoken)		0:56
8.	"Go Captain Feathersword, Ahoy!"	Cook, Fatt, Field, Page, John Field	2:13
9.	"Bathtime" (Not featured on the Lyrick/Koch release)	Raffi	2:09
10.	"Wah Hoo Hey, I'm Combing My Hair Today"		2:00
11.	"Head, Shoulders, Knees and Toes"		2:23
12.	"Silver Bells That Ring in the Night" (Not featured on the Lyrick/Koch release)		2:12
13.	"Zardo Zap"		2:41
14.	"Henry the Octopus"		1:26
15.	"Move Your Arms Like Henry"	Paul Field	1:49
16.	"Do the Wiggle Groove"	Cook, Fatt, Field, Page, John Field	2:18
17.	"Balla Balla Intro" (spoken)		0:15
18.	"Balla Balla Bambina"	Alfonso Rinaldi	2:10
19.	"I Climb Ten Stairs"		1:11
20.	"We're Dancing with Wags the Dog"		1:22
21.	"Wags the Dog, He Likes to Tango"		1:04
22.	"Captain Feathersword Fell Asleep on His Pirate Ship (Quack Quack)"		1:55
23.	"Rocket"		1:50
24.	"Officer Beaples' Dance"	Cook, Fatt, Field, Page, Dominic Lindsay	1:41
25.	"Let's Have a Ceili"	Lindsay	2:04
Total length:			43:09

== Musicians ==
- Vocals: Greg Page
- Backing Vocals: Mark Punch, Paul Paddick, Kevin Bennett, Jeff Fatt, Anthony Field, Murray Cook
- Guitars: Murray Cook, Anthony Field, Tony Douglass
- Bass: Murray Cook
- Drums/Percussion: Tony Henry, Paul Hester
- Violin: Maria Schattovits
- Cello: Margaret Lindsay
- Trumpet: Dominic Lindsay

== Release history ==
The album was released in 1998 in CD and cassette formats:

- ABC Music: 7243 4 94411 25.
- ABC Music: 7243 4 94411 49.
- ABC Music: 7243 4 96238 2 8 – CD re-release with new artwork
- Koch Records: KOC-CD-8685 – CD 2003 release with newer artwork

== Gallery ==
US cover

== Video ==
Toot Toot!
- Directed by: Chisholm McTavish
- Produced by: Paul Field
- Starring: Greg Page; Anthony Field; Murray Cook; Jeff Fatt
- Music by: The Wiggles
- Distributed by: Roadshow Entertainment / ABC Video (#101484)
- Release date: 17 October 1998
- Running time: 46 minutes
- Country: Australia

Toot Toot! is the seventh video by the children's band the Wiggles. It was released in Australia on 17 October 1998, and later re-released in 1999 to reflect set updates during production of the TV series. In the United Kingdom, the video was released under the title Big Red Car.

=== Song list ===
1. Look Both Ways
2. John Bradlelum
3. Henry's Underwater Big Band (1999 version only)
4. Head, Shoulders, Knees and Toes
5. Food, Food, Food (Oh How I Love My Food)
6. Go Captain Feathersword, Ahoy!
7. Bathtime (1998 version only)
8. Do the Wiggle Groove
9. Dorothy the Dinosaur (Tell Me Who Is That Knocking?)
10. Balla Balla Bambina
11. I Climb Ten Stairs
12. Move Your Arms Like Henry
13. Silver Bells That Ring in the Night
14. Wags the Dog, He Likes to Tango
15. We're Dancing with Wags the Dog
16. Officer Beaples' Dance
17. Zardo Zap
18. Let's Have a Ceili
19. Toot Toot, Chugga Chugga, Big Red Car

=== Cast ===
The Wiggles:

- Anthony Field
- Jeff Fatt
- Murray Cook
- Greg Page

Additional cast:

- Paul Paddick as Captain Feathersword
- Leeanne Ashley as Dorothy the Dinosaur
- Edward Rooke as Wags the Dog
- Elisha Burke as Henry the Octopus
- Leanne Halloran as Officer Beaples
- Leanne Halloran and Elyssa Dawson as Zardo Zap
- Mitchell Butel as Raiffe the Mechanic

=== Release date ===
Toot Toot! was first released on 17 October 1998.

In 1999, the Wiggles re-released the video, but made significant edits to reflect changes made in the television series. Although the general story is still about The Wiggles having to find a way to fix their Big Red Car, the scenes were redone with new animations and backgrounds. "Bathtime" and its introduction were replaced with a new version of the "Henry's Underwater Big Band" video.

The video was dedicated to the memory of Anthony's father, John Patrick Field, who played John the cook on the original 1994 version of Yummy Yummy.

The 1999 version was released to DVD in 2004 in Australia. The extras include a Wiggly Work storybook and two episodes from the Lights, Camera, Action TV series.

From November 2019–January 2020, the video was uploaded to the Wiggles' YouTube channel in multiple parts, using the 1999 version.
