= Santa's Rockin'! =

2004 studio album/video by The Wiggles

Studio album by the Wiggles
- Released: 2004
- Recorded: 2004
- Studios: Electric Avenue Studios, Sydney, Australia (Note: John Fogerty recorded at NRG Studios, Los Angeles, USA)
- Genre: Children's music
- Length: 40:40
- Label: ABC
- Producer: Anthony Field

The Wiggles chronology
Cold Spaghetti Western (2004)	Santa's Rockin'! (2004)	Live Hot Potatoes! (2005)

Santa's Rockin'! is the 20th album release from Australian children's music group, the Wiggles. It is also the third Wiggles Christmas video release. It was released in 2004 by ABC Music and distributed by Roadshow Entertainment.

== Track list ==
1. "Introduction"
2. "Ring-A-Ding-A-Ding-Dong"
3. "Introduction"
4. "Great Big Man in Red" (featuring John Fogerty)
5. "Introduction"
6. "Mary's Boy Child"
7. "Introduction"
8. "Captain Feathersword's Christmas Dance"
9. "Introduction"
10. "Rockin' Santa!" (featuring John Fogerty)
11. "Introduction"
12. "Noche De Paz" (Silent Night)
13. "Introduction"
14. "This Little Baby is Born Again" (featuring Ross Wilson)
15. "Introduction"
16. "Wags Stop Your Barking, It's Almost Christmas Day" (featuring Barry Williams)
17. "Introduction"
18. "Christmas Barcarolle" (Let the World Rejoice)
19. "Introduction"
20. "Dorothy's Christmas Roses"
21. "Introduction"
22. "Away in a Manger"
23. "Introduction"
24. "Henry the Champion Christmas Wrapper"
25. "O Come All Ye Faithful"
26. "Introduction"
27. "Day of Joy, Day of Peace" (Hamish's Lullaby)
28. "Outro"

== Personnel ==
Credits adapted from the liner notes of Santa's Rockin'.

- The Wiggles are: Murray Cook, Jeff Fatt, Anthony Field, Greg Page
- Produced by: Anthony Field
- Musical Arrangements: The Wiggles, Dominic Lindsay
- Vocals: Greg Page
- Backing Vocals: The Wiggles
- Guest Vocals: John Fogerty, Barry Williams, Ross Wilson, Santa Claus, Fernando Moguel, Fernandito Moguel, Julio Moguel
- Manzillas: Craig Abercrombie, Brett Clarke, Ryan De Saulnier, Sam Moran, Paul Paddick, Mark Punch
- Guitars: Anthony Field, John Field, Robin Gist, Mark Punch
- Bass: Murray Cook, Chris Lupton
- Keyboard: Jeff Fatt, Steve Blau, Dominic Lindsay
- Brass: Dominic Lindsay
- Drums: Tony Henry
- Percussion: Dominic Lindsay, Steve Machamer

== Video ==
Santa's Rockin'!
- Directed by: Paul Field
- Produced by: Paul Field
- Starring: the Wiggles
- Distributed by: Roadshow/ABC Video (#104331)
- Release date: 2004
- Running time: 85 minutes (including bonus features)
- Country: Australia

Santa's Rockin'! was released on video in 2004.

=== Song list ===
1. "Captain Feathersword's Christmas Dance"
2. "Ring-A-Ding-A-Ding-Dong"
3. "Great Big Man in Red" (featuring John Fogerty)
4. "Away in a Manger"
5. "Christmas Barcarolle" (Let the World Rejoice)
6. "Henry the Champion Christmas Wrapper"
7. "This Little Baby is Born Again" (featuring Ross Wilson)
8. "Noche De Paz" (Silent Night)
9. "Dorothy's Christmas Roses"
10. "O Come, All Ye Faithful"
11. "Wags Stop Your Barking, It's Almost at Christmas Day" (featuring Barry Williams)
12. "Rockin' Santa!" (featuring John Fogerty)

=== Cast ===
The cast as presented on the video:

The Wiggles are
- Murray Cook
- Jeff Fatt
- Anthony Field
- Greg Page

Additional Cast
- Captain Feathersword: Paul Paddick
- Dorothy the Dinosaur: Lyn Stuckey
- Wags the Dog: Kristy Talbot
- Henry the Octopus: Katherine Patrick

Special Guest Musicians
- John Fogerty
- Fermando Moguel Sr.
- Fermandito Moguel Jr.
- Julio Moguel
- Barry Williams
- Ross Wilson
