= Wiggly, Wiggly Christmas =

1996 studio album / 1997 video by the Wiggles

Studio album by the Wiggles
- Released: 22 November 1996
- Recorded: 1995–1996
- Studios: The Tracking Station Studios, Sydney
- Genre: Children's music
- Length: 33:27
- Labels: ABC (AUS); Lyrick Studios (US); Koch Records (US); Union Square Music (UK)
- Producer: The Wiggles

The Wiggles chronology
Wake Up Jeff! (1996)	Wiggly, Wiggly Christmas (1996)	The Wiggles Movie Soundtrack (1997)

Wiggly, Wiggly Christmas, released in 1996 by ABC Music distributed by EMI. It is the Wiggles' seventh album and the group's first Christmas album. It was made into a video the following year.

== Track listing ==
All tracks are written by (or trad arr. by) M Cook/J Fatt/A Field/G Page, except listed below.

No.	Title	Writer(s)	Length
1.	"Have a Very Merry Christmas"	John Field	0:31
2.	"Wiggly, Wiggly Christmas"	Cook, Fatt, Field, Page, Paul Paddick	2:14
3.	"With a Shiny Red Nose" (spoken)		0:07
4.	"Rudolf the Red Nosed Reindeer"	Johnny Marks	1:56
5.	"If You See Santa" (spoken)		0:11
6.	"Go Santa Go"	John Field	1:49
7.	"Ding Dong Merrily on High"		1:29
8.	"Shepherds" (spoken)		0:11
9.	"Christmas Star"		0:28
10.	"Unto Us, This Holy Night"	John Field	2:04
11.	"Feliz Navidad"	Jose Feliciano	2:20
12.	"Peace and Joy to Everyone" (spoken)		0:05
13.	"Jingle Bells"		1:52
14.	"Christmas Picnic"		2:20
15.	"Let's Clap Hands for Santa Claus"		1:32
16.	"Breebop Poem" (spoken)		0:08
17.	"Henry's Christmas Dance"		1:36
18.	"Jeff's Christmas Tune"		1:59
19.	"Pirate Food Poem" (spoken)		0:11
20.	"It's a Christmas Party on the Goodship Feathersword"		1:56
21.	"Away in a Manger"		1:03
22.	"Wags Ate the Rags" (spoken)		0:07
23.	"Wags is Bouncing Around the Christmas Tree"		1:27
24.	"Reindeer Express"		2:02
25.	"Silent Night"		2:59
26.	"We Wish You a Merry Christmas"		0:26
Total length:			33:27

== Personnel ==
Credits are taken from the album's liner notes.

The Wiggles

- Murray Cook – backing vocals, guitars, bass
- Jeff Fatt – backing vocals, organs, piano, accordion
- Greg Page – lead and backing vocals, guitars
- Anthony Field – backing vocals, guitars

Additional musicians

- Paul Paddick – backing vocals
- Terry Murray – guitars
- Rex Kellher – guitars
- Tony Henry – drums
- Peter Iacano – drums
- Dom Lindsay – trumpet, piccolo trumpet, flugelhorn
- Maria Schattovits – violin
- Angela Lindsay – viola
- Margaret Lindsay – cello

Staff

- Engineered by: Chris Brooks, Alex Keller, Roy Mollace, Aaron Ruig
- Recorded at The Tracking Station Studios, Sydney

== 2017 album ==
Wiggly, Wiggly Christmas!

Studio album by the Wiggles
- Released: 27 October 2017
- Genre: Children's Music
- Length: 43:45
- Label: ABC
- Producers: Anthony Field & Lachlan Gillespie

The Wiggles chronology
Duets (2017)	Wiggly, Wiggly Christmas! (2017)	Nursery Rhymes 2 (2018)

Wiggly, Wiggly Christmas! is a Wiggles album released on 27 October 2017.

=== Track list ===
All tracks are written by (or trad arr. by) Anthony Field, Lachlan Gillespie, Simon Pryce, Emma Watkins, Oliver Brian, Alex Keller, except listed below.

No.	Title	Writer(s)	Length
1.	"Wiggly, Wiggly Christmas"	Murray Cook, Jeff Fatt, Anthony Field, Greg Page, Paul Paddick
2.	"Here Come the Reindeer"	Murray Cook, Jeff Fatt, Anthony Field, Greg Page, John Field
3.	"Jingle Bells"
4.	"It's a Christmas Party on the Goodship Feathersword"	Murray Cook, Jeff Fatt, Anthony Field, Greg Page
5.	"A Christmas Story"
6.	"Go Santa Go"	John Field
7.	"Henry's Christmas Merengue"
8.	"Christmas Picnic"	Murray Cook, Jeff Fatt, Anthony Field, Greg Page
9.	"Dorothy's Special Christmas Cake"
10.	"Rudolph the Red-Nosed Reindeer"	Johnny Marks
11.	"Curoo Curoo"
12.	"Christmas Serenade"
13.	"Shining Around the World"
14.	"Wags is Bouncing Around the Christmas Tree"	Murray Cook, Jeff Fatt, Anthony Field, Greg Page
15.	"Away in a Manger"
16.	"Great Big Man in Red"	Murray Cook, Jeff Fatt, Anthony Field, Greg Page, John Field, Dominic Lindsay
17.	"Let's Clap Hands for Santa Claus"	Murray Cook, Jeff Fatt, Anthony Field, Greg Page
18.	"Stille Nacht"
19.	"Christmas Carol Mega Mix"

=== Personnel ===
- The Wiggles: Anthony Field, Lachlan Gillespie, Simon Pryce, Emma Watkins
- Music Produced by Anthony Field & Lachlan Gillespie
- Vocals: Lachlan Gillespie, Greg Page, Paul Paddick, Simon Pryce, Emma Watkins
- Backing Vocals: Lachlan Gillespie, Paul Paddick, Simon Pryce, Emma Watkins
- Santa: Paul Paddick
- Bass Guitar: Alex Keller
- Piano: Lachlan Gillespie
- Keyboard: Oliver Brian, Lachlan Gillespie
- Trumpet: Michael McFadden
- Drum Programming: Oliver Brian
- Sleigh Bells: Oliver Brian
- Acoustic & Electric Guitar: Oliver Brian, Anthony Field, Alex Keller
- Nylon Guitar: Oliver Brian
- Claps: Lachlan Gillespie, Simon Pryce, Emma Watkins
- Bass Drum: Anthony Field
- Marching Snare: Oliver Brian
- Character Voices: Maria Field, Lachlan Gillespie, Paul Paddick
- Bagpipes: Anthony Field
- Wags the Dog: Lachlan Gillespie
- Dialogue: Anthony Field
- Banjo: Anthony Field
- Dobro: Oliver Brian

=== Staff ===
- Music Recorded at Hot Potato Studios, Sydney, NSW
- Music Recorded & Mixed by Alex Keller
- Production Manager: Kate Chiodo
- Graphic Design: Daniel Attard
- Still Photographer: Daniel Attard

== Video ==
The album was also made into a video with the same title. It was originally released in 1997 in the Australia region. It was later edited and re-released in 1999 to account for changes made in the TV series and the addition of a "Wiggly Christmas Medley".

=== Song list ===
1. Have a Very Merry Christmas
2. Wiggly, Wiggly Christmas
3. Rudolf the Red-Nose Reindeer (1997 Version Only)
4. Here Comes Santa Claus
5. Go Santa Go
6. Ding Dong Merrily on High
7. Christmas Star
8. Unto Us, This Holy Night
9. Feliz Navidad
10. Jingle Bells
11. Christmas Picnic
12. Let's Clap Hands for Santa Claus
13. Henry's Christmas Dance
14. Jeff's Christmas Tune
15. It's a Christmas Party on the Goodship Feathersword
16. Away in a Manger
17. Wags is Bouncing Around the Christmas Tree
18. Silent Night
19. We Wish You a Merry Christmas
20. Wiggly Christmas Medley (1999 Version Only)

=== Production ===
As with The Wiggles Movie, the costumes for The Wiggles and friends were updated. It is the first video besides the movie where The Wiggles have logos on their shirts. Producer and director Dean Covell added "3D animation" to the videos.

The Christmas set was in the background during the taping of the interviews with The Wiggles and Captain Feathersword for The Wiggles Movie Soundtrack Enhance CD bonus track.

=== Release ===
In an August 1997 article by The Sun-Herald, the Wiggles planned to release the Christmas video in November, and was going to tour New South Wales and Victoria. The Powerhouse Museum website listed the video as being released in September 1997. However, The Wiggles Exhibition at the Powerhouse Museum Exhibition itself showed a video poster with a video release date of Wiggly, Wiggly Christmas On ABC Video for 13 October 1997.

=== Cast ===
The Wiggles are:

- Murray Cook
- Jeff Fatt
- Anthony Field
- Greg Page

Additional cast include:

- Paul Paddick as Captain Feathersword
- Leeanne Ashley as Dorothy the Dinosaur
  - Carolyn Ferrie provides Dorothy's voice
- Charmaine Martin as Henry the Octopus
- Edward Rooke as Wags the Dog
- Jonathon Mill as Santa Claus

=== 1999 re-release ===
The video was re-released in 1999 with the removal of "Rudolf the Red-Nosed Reindeer", and the addition of a concert track called "Wiggly Christmas Medley".

In 2018, the 1999 video version was released into multiple segments on their YouTube channel as Classic Wiggles.

=== Home release ===
A listing of release dates for the 1999 edition. The US DVD features a photo gallery.

==== VHS ====
- Region 4 (Australia): 13 October 1999 (Roadshow/ABC Video #102341)
- Region 2 (United Kingdom): 1 November 1999 (Buena Vista/Walt Disney Home Video, EAN 5017186111975)
- Region 1 (North America): 24 October 2000 (HIT Entertainment, under Lyrick Studios #2505)

==== DVD ====
- Region 1 (North America): 30 September 2003 (HIT Entertainment #24031)
- Region 2 (United Kingdom): 21 November 2005 (HIT Entertainment HIT41802 2-pack with Yule Be Wiggling)
- Region 4 (Australia): 9 October 2006 (Roadshow #102341-9)

== 2017 video ==
Wiggly, Wiggly Christmas is a Wiggles video that was released on 1 November 2017, a partial remake named after the 1997 video of the same name.

=== Song list ===
1. Wiggly, Wiggly Christmas
2. Here Come the Reindeer
3. Jingle Bells
4. It's a Christmas Party on the Goodship Feathersword
5. A Christmas Story
6. Go Santa Go (featuring Greg Wiggle)
7. Henry's Christmas Merengue
8. Christmas Picnic
9. Dorothy's Special Christmas Cake
10. Curoo Curoo (The Carol of the Birds)
11. Christmas Serenade
12. Shining Around the World
13. Wags is Bouncing Around the Christmas Tree
14. Away in a Manger
15. Great Big Man in Red
16. Let's Clap Hands for Santa Claus
17. Stille Nacht
18. Christmas Carol Mega Mix
