= The Wiggles (album) =

Studio album by the Wiggles
- Released: August 1991
- Recorded: February 1991
- Studios: Tracking Station Recording Studios, Sydney, Australia
- Genre: Children's music
- Length: 34:42
- Label: ABC Music/Phonogram
- Producer: Anthony Field

The Wiggles chronology
The Wiggles (1991)	Here Comes a Song (1992)

The Wiggles is the debut album by the Australian children's band the Wiggles, released in 1991 by ABC Music distributed by Phonogram. As a student music project at Macquarie University, the band assembled a group of songs reworked from the Cockroaches as well as arrangements of children's music. It was the only album that involved Phillip Wilcher as one of the group's members. The album sold 100,000 copies, and received Australian Record Industry Association (ARIA) and Australasian Performing Right Association (APRA) awards.

== Background and development ==
In 1990, while working with the early childhood music department at Macquarie University, Phillip Wilcher met musician and former member of the Australian rock group the Cockroaches, Anthony Field, who was studying child development. According to Wilcher, Field asked him to join the Wiggles, which would become "Australia's foremost children's entertainment act", and to help them produce the album. The album was dedicated to the memory of Paul Field's infant daughter, Bernadette, who had died of SIDS in 1988.

The band produced a folder of essays that explained the educational value of each song on the album.

They needed a keyboardist "to bolster the rock-n-roll feel of the project", so Field asked his old bandmate Fatt, for his assistance in what they thought would be a temporary project. (Note: According to Field, the four original members of the Wiggles, with Page's "mellifluous voice" and "perfect children's music instrument", Cook's knowledge of child development, Fatt's "incredible musicianship and gentle persona" that appealed to children, and Field's energy, balanced each other (Field, p. 44).) Recording sessions were held at Wilcher's home, and the album cost approximately A$4,000 to produce.

The group reworked a few Cockroaches tunes to better fit the genre of children's music; for example, according to Field, a Cockroaches song he wrote, "Mr. Wiggles Back in Town" became "Get Ready to Wiggle" and inspired the band's name because they thought that wiggling described the way children dance. There was also a piece by Phillip Wilcher, "Summer Dance", that appeared on the album, as "Archie's Theme". Likewise, the tune of another Cockroaches song, "Another Saturday Night", was reused for the song "Dorothy the Dinosaur".

== Promotion and release ==
At first, the Wiggles filmed two music videos with the Australian Broadcasting Corporation (ABC) to promote their first album; they also decided to create a self-produced, forty-minute long video version of their album. Finances were limited, so there was no post-production editing of the video project. They used Field's nieces and nephews as additional cast, and hired the band's girlfriends to perform in character costumes. Cook's wife made their first costumes. They used two cameras and visually checked the performance of each song; that way, according to Paul Field, it took them less time to complete a forty-minute video than it took other production companies to complete a three-minute music video. Jeremy Fabinyi, the Cockroaches' former manager, became the Wiggles' first manager. Using connections gained during the Cockroaches years, he negotiated with the ABC to air their TV show and to help them promote their first recording.

Field distributed copies of their album to his young students to test out the effect of the group's music on children; one child's mother returned it the next day because her child would not stop listening to it, having listened to the track Dorothy the Dinosaur 40 times.

The album sold 100,000 copies in 1991. Australian Record Industry Association (ARIA) awarded the band members, including Wilcher, with gold and platinum certificates for the album.

In 1992, Wilcher left the Wiggles and submitted a letter of resignation because he wanted to continue composing classical music. According to fellow member, Greg Page, "Archie had considerable input into the arrangement of some songs on that first CD ... he is quite a musical genius ... his creative flair suited those kinds of pieces ... However ... the musical direction of the Wiggles was changing".

== Track listing ==
No.	Title	Music	Length
1.	"Get Ready to Wiggle"	Murray Cook, Jeff Fatt, Anthony Field, Greg Page, John Field	1:57
2.	"Rock-a-Bye Your Bear"	M. Cook, J. Fatt, A. Field, G. Page	1:46
3.	"Dorothy the Dinosaur"	M. Cook, J. Fatt, A. Field, G. Page, J. Field	2:23
4.	"Mischief the Monkey"	Phillip Wilcher	0:44
5.	"Lavender's Blue"	Trad	1:32
6.	"Glub Glub Train" (spoken)	M. Cook, J. Fatt, A. Field, G. Page	0:19
7.	"Archie's Theme"	P. Wilcher	0:20
8.	"Montezuma"	Trad	0:32
9.	"Archie's Theme" (reprise)	P. Wilcher	0:20
10.	"Ducky Ducky" (spoken)	M. Cook, J. Fatt, A. Field, G. Page	0:15
11.	"A Froggy He Would A-Wooing Go"	Trad	3:36
12.	"Maranoa Lullaby"	Trad	2:04
13.	"Stars" (spoken)	M. Cook, J. Fatt, A. Field, G. Page, P. Wilcher	0:09
14.	"Star Lullaby"	Trad	1:46
15.	"Okki Tokki Unga"	Trad	1:55
16.	"O Epoe Tooki Tooki"	Trad	1:37
17.	"Vini Vini"	Michael Goldsen, Leon Pober, Yves Rocher	0:58
18.	"Spot the Dalmatian"	M. Cook, J. Fatt, A. Field, G. Page, J. Field	2:24
19.	"Johnny Works With One Hammer"	Trad	0:49
20.	"The Man on the Moon" (spoken)	P. Wilcher	0:21
21.	"This Old Man"	Trad	2:32
22.	"Suo Gan"	Trad	1:43
23.	"Wind" (spoken)	M. Cook, J. Fatt, A. Field, G. Page	0:17
24.	"Joseph John's Lullaby"	Brahms/P. Wilcher (Arr. P. Wilcher)	1:21
25.	"Desert Dreaming" (spoken)	M. Cook, J. Fatt, A. Field, G. Page, P. Wilcher	1:52
26.	"Get Ready to Wiggle" (reprise)	M. Cook, J. Fatt, A. Field, G. Page, J. Field	1:57

== Release history ==
The album was released in 1991 in CD and cassette formats:

- ABC Records: 510 082-2
- ABC Records: 510 082-4
- ABC Music: 814338 2

== Personnel ==
Credits from The Wiggles album booklet.

The Wiggles

- Phillip Wilcher – piano, vocals
- Murray Cook – guitar, bass guitar, vocals, water bubble sounds
- Gregory Page – lead vocals, guitar, hand claps
- Jeff Fatt – accordion, Emax, sequencing, Mischief's voice
- Anthony Field – tin whistle, didgeridoo, vocals, chief kabasa player

Production

- Anthony Field – producer
- Steve Pomfrett – engineer
