= The Wiggles characters =

Children's entertainment characters

The Wiggles characters are a group of characters who perform with the Wiggles, the Australian children's music group. Aside from the eight Wiggles, four secondary characters, along with a troupe of singers, actors, and dancers, appear in their television series, videos, and live concerts. These characters were developed in the 1990s and were originally played by group members and by Anthony Field's brother Paul Field, the band's manager. Later in the group's history, the characters were played by hired actors dressed in the characters' costumes.

== Dorothy the Dinosaur ==
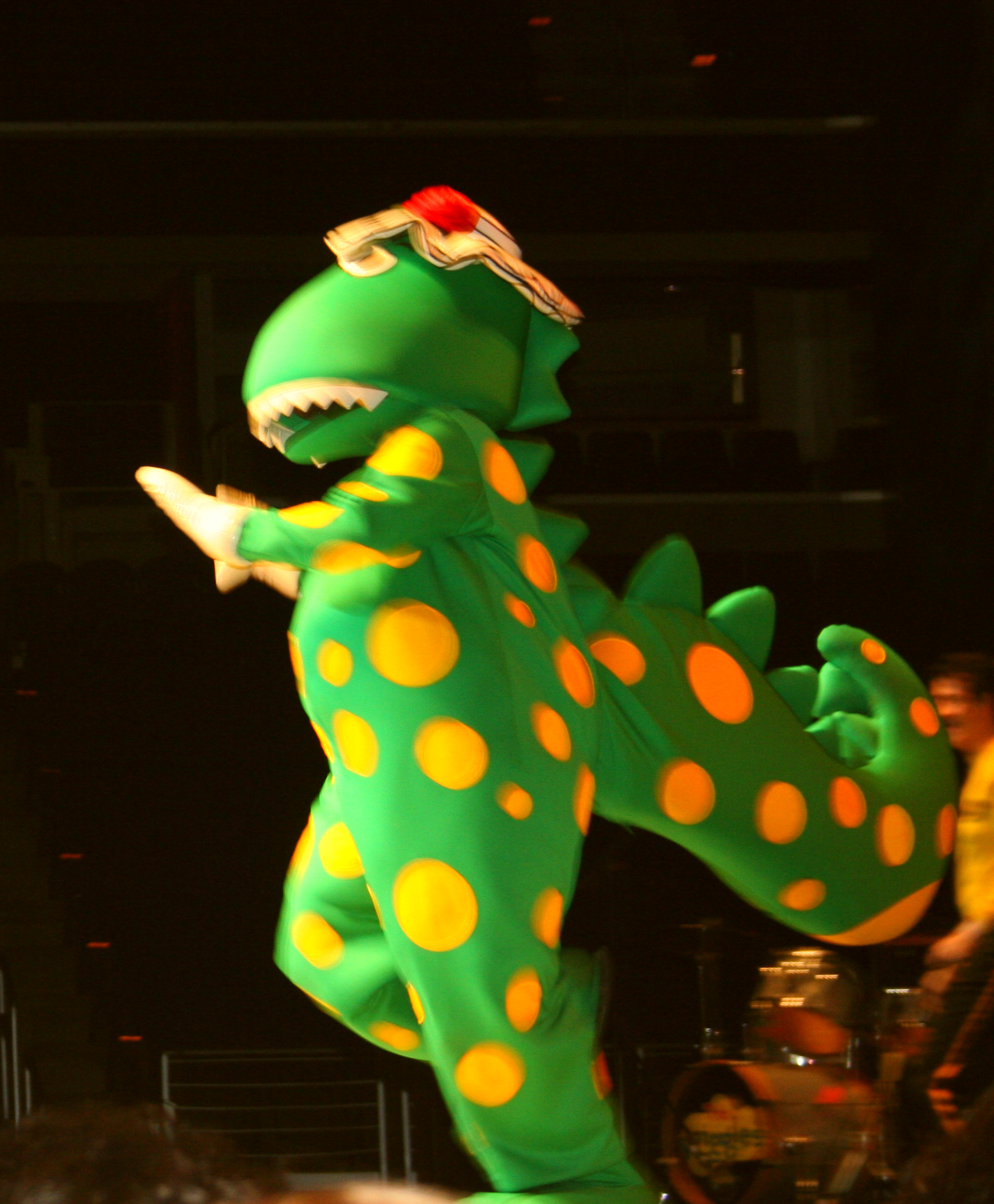
Dorothy the Dinosaur

Dorothy the Dinosaur is a "rososaurus", a "yellow-spotted green herbivorous dinosaur (ornithischian) with surprisingly scary teeth". She lives in a pink and purple house with her own Rosy Orchestra and a rose garden in her backyard. She loves to eat roses and dance the ballet. She enjoys serving guests rose-derived treats such as "rosy-posy tea". She also has a distinctive, trill-like, descending laugh. She was the first character to be introduced, in 1991.

Murray Cook created Dorothy from his experiences in working at a preschool, sensing a need to make up some good dinosaur songs. The Cockroaches song "Another Saturday Night" was reworked as her theme. Cook's wife Meg designed the first Dorothy costume. Dorothy was part of the band's early stage shows, and was originally played by Cook, then Wiggles choreographer Leeanne Ashley, and Wiggles dancers such as Caterina Mete and Lyn Stuckey. She is currently played by Caterina Mete, Chelsey Priadko, and Stephanie Di Coio.

Ashley was Dorothy's first full-time portrayer; according to Field, she "wrote the blueprint" for the character. Ashley developed movements that conveyed Dorothy's unique personality. She now works at a NSW dance studio called Squire Dance Academy.

South Australian opera singer and dancer, Carolyn Ferrie, has provided Dorothy's voice from 1997 to 2001, and again from 2004 to 2009. (Note: John Field's wife Jacqueline, provided Dorothy's voice during their Lights, Camera, Action TV series from 2002 to 2003 (as well as other media until 2005), and Emma Buter has provided singing on some of their albums prior to Ferrie.) Ferrie described Dorothy as "a dinosaur superstar … very open, friendly, and warm. She is like a mother figure even though she is only meant to be five, and kids really respond to her … She is calm and mothering but friendly as well. She's young and still playful but has got a motherly feeling to her". Ferrie insisted that Dorothy "is number one after the boys including Captain Feathersword, in terms of who kids say they love". She is currently voiced by Maria Field (the youngest daughter of Anthony Field) and Caterina Mete. Paul Paddick, who plays Captain Feathersword, has also been providing Dorothy's voice in live shows since 2018.

In 1996, shortly before moving into American markets, the Wiggles discovered that someone in Maine had registered Dorothy as a trademark, so they reached an agreement and paid a settlement. In 2007, Dorothy began to star in her own television show in Australia. The show had a distinct look and sound. Whereas the Wiggles' TV shows were "hyper-real and cartoonish" and had a pop sound, Dorothy's show was "really rich and beautiful looking" and based its sound on orchestral music.

Dorothy was the focus of her own touring production, which performed in smaller cities the Wiggles could not perform. The production, based upon the TV show, was written by Field, and Moran was the host of this show before he joined the band as the yellow Wiggle. Lyn Stuckey, who later married Moran, played Dorothy. This sub-brand was phased out in 2013 with the introduction of the new generation of Wiggles. Female Wiggle, Emma Watkins, filled this gap with her own sub-brand.

=== Dorothy the Dinosaur TV series videos ===
- Dorothy the Dinosaur's Party (2007)
- Dorothy the Dinosaur – Memory Book (2008) (known in US as The Wiggles Present Dorothy the Dinosaur)
- Dorothy the Dinosaur Meets Santa Claus (2009) (Cartoon)
- Dorothy the Dinosaur – Rockin' Christmas (2010)
- Dorothy the Dinosaur – TV Series 1 (2010)
- Dorothy the Dinosaur's Travelling Show (2011)
- Dorothy The Dinosaur's Wonderful World (2012)
- Dorothy The Dinosaur's Beach Party (2012)

== Captain Feathersword ==
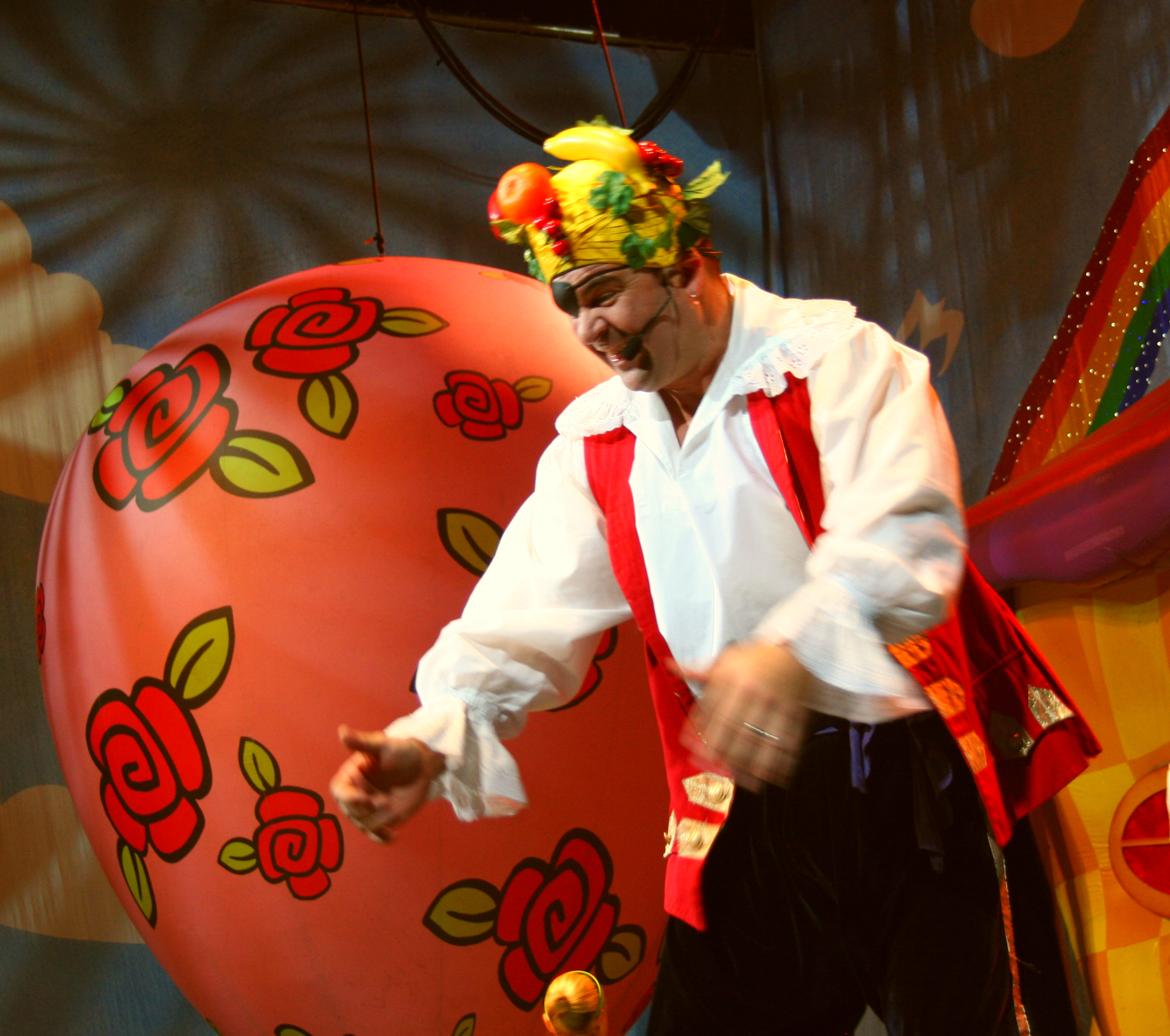
Captain Feathersword

Captain Feathersword, "the friendly pirate", wears a hat, patch, and puffy shirt and wields a "feathersword". The Captain was created because the Wiggles understood that young children like pirates; they gave him a "feathersword" because they wanted him to be non-violent, inspired by the gentleness of Murray Cook's close friend, James A Ide who often used nonviolent props to entertain young children in his local area. Field originated the role, but in 1993, when he had to undergo a hernia operation, the role, along with the Blue Wiggle and Wags the Dog, was played by Paul Paddick. Paddick would later play Captain Feathersword on a more permanent basis. At first, Paddick's role was minor, but it eventually evolved into a role so significant that he has been called "the Fifth Wiggle". Field described Paddick as "just as funny offstage as on", For many parents, his vocal impersonations were "the high point of the Wiggles stage show" and included singers Mick Jagger, Cher, Plácido Domingo and James Hetfield.

== Henry the Octopus ==
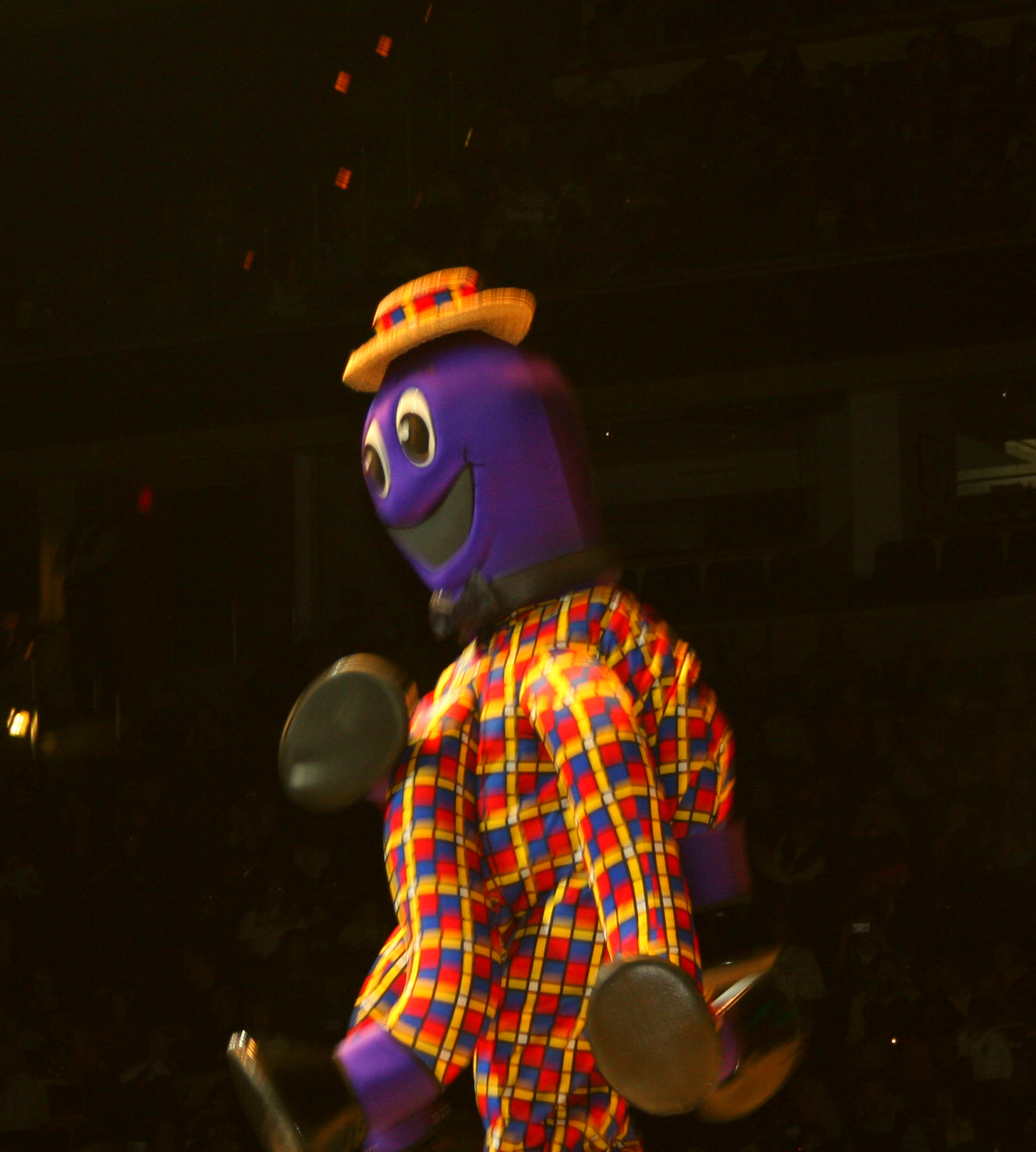
Henry the Octopus

Introduced in 1992, Henry the Octopus "directs an underwater band and loves to dance with his eight legs". He was named after Tony Henry, the drummer in The Cockroaches, who also provided the Wiggles with musical support throughout the years. The character was developed by Fatt, who originally served as Henry's voice. Paul Paddick took over the role of the voice in the mid-2000s. He has appeared as both a puppet and a mascot, the latter of which has been played by various dancers on staff.

== Wags the Dog ==
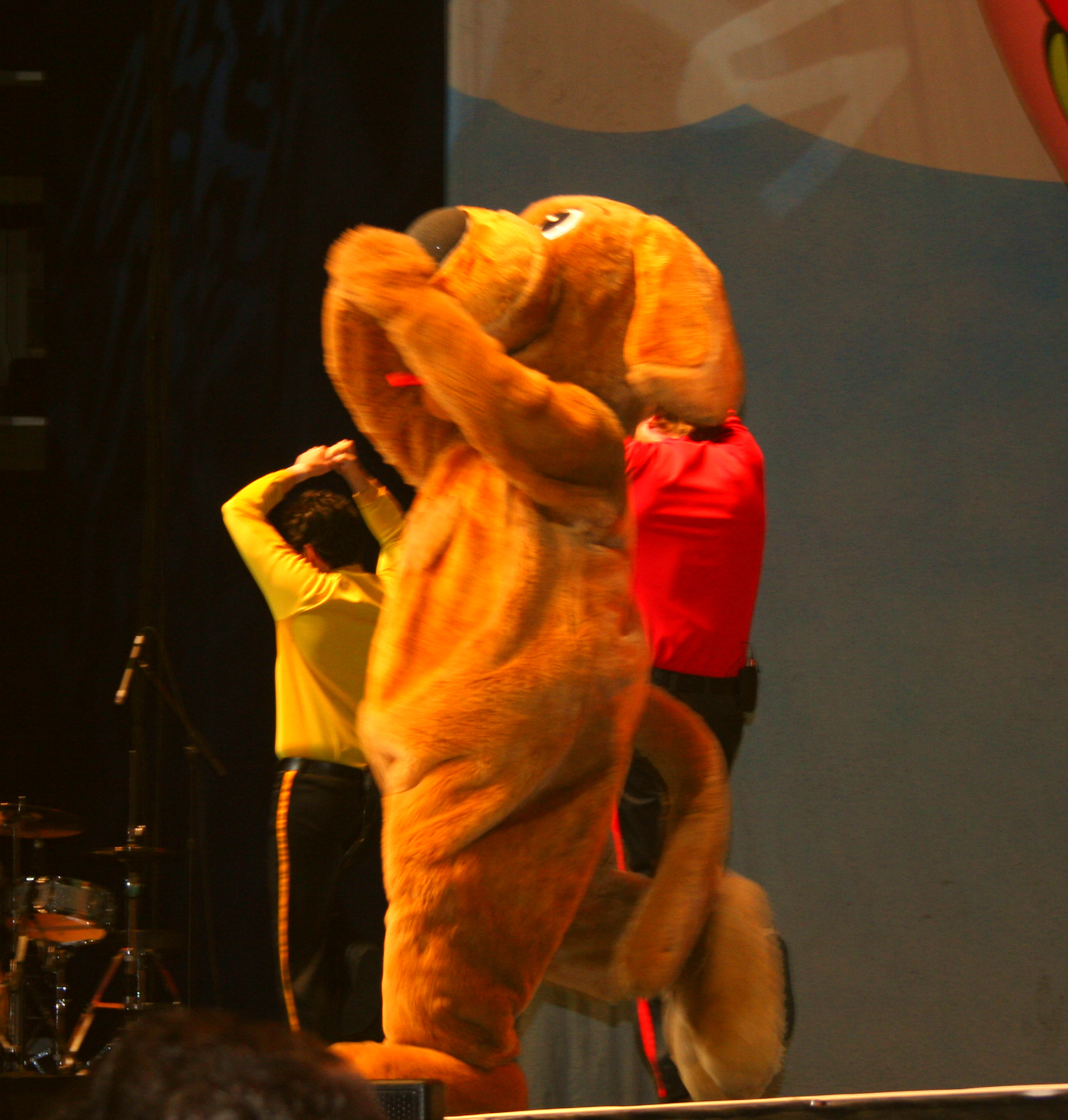
Wags the Dog

Introduced in 1995, Wags is a tall, brown, furry dog with floppy ears and a happy face. He is also Captain Feathersword's best friend and pet. He "loves to sing and dance and kids bring 'bones' that the Wiggly dancers collect from the audience". The last of the four characters to be introduced, Wags was originally played by Field. Fatt provided the original barking noises for Wags before Paul Paddick, who also plays Captain Feathersword, took over. Mic Conway of The Captain Matchbox Whoopee Band fame, has provided Wags's full-spoken dialogue before Paul Field, general manager of The Wiggles and brother of Blue Wiggle Anthony, took over. Wags has also been played by Edward Rooke, Andrew McCourt, Kristy Talbot and Paddick.

== Shirley Shawn the Unicorn ==
Shirley Shawn is a yellow unicorn who was introduced in 2019. They are a baby, who has a heart-shaped nose, purple hair, and says only one word "Scrumptious!". They love to eat rainbow coloured veggies and apples. They were voiced by former yellow Wiggle, Emma Watkins, in their debut. Introduced as female in 2019, they were confirmed to be non-binary from 2020 until 2022, before permanently reverting back to female since 2023. They have since been voiced by current yellow Wiggle, Tsehay Hawkins.

== Paloma the Mermaid ==
Paloma is a mermaid from The Wiggles. She has two different costume styles, her first being a blue and white tube top with green and blue seaweed like ribbons and the second being a pink top with a fish scale like skirt. Although the blue costume was the original design, she made her debut in the pink outfit because the Fruit Salad TV Christmas Special premiered on The Wiggles' YouTube channel before the Wiggly Fruit Salad mini-series first aired on television. She was played by Paloma Hendry-Hodsdon.

== Bok the Hand Puppet ==
Bok is a hand puppet from The Wiggles. Bok's origins date back to the early 1990s before The Wiggles started, when Anthony Field, Murray Cook, and Greg Page were studying early childhood education at Macquarie University. Their professor, Rosemary Harle, had a clown puppet named Bok (short for "Boccherini") that was used in music lessons. When Bok appears in The Wiggles concerts, a giant Bok costume was needed. It also appeared occasionally in Ready, Steady, Wiggle! Series 4.

== Minor characters ==
For the stage shows, the Wiggles have used two 16-metre (52 ft) trucks, three tour buses, a cast of 13 dancers, and 10 permanent crew members. The Wiggly TV series included Officer Beaples (played by former Wiggles choreographer Leanne Halloran) and Flora Door, a talking door in front of Wigglehouse. The "Wiggly Dancers" have always made up a major part of the Wiggles shows and TV programs and play many of the minor roles. Other characters of note include The Cook (portrayed by Anthony Field's father, John, and Crowded House drummer Paul Hester), Professor Singalottasonga (played by Sam Moran), Magdalena the Mermaid (played by Naomi Wallace in Wiggle Bay and Larissa Wright in Racing to the Rainbow).

== Works cited ==
- Field, Anthony; Truman, Greg (2012). How I Got My Wiggle Back: A Memoir of Healing. Hoboken, New Jersey: John Wiley & Sons. 272pp. ISBN 978-1-118-01933-7.
