= Fingertips (album) =

Studio album by The Cockroaches
- Released: October 1988
- Recorded: Sydney, Australia
- Genre: Pub rock, Pop rock
- Length: 34:35
- Label: Regular Records, Festival Records
- Producer: Charles Fisher

The Cockroaches chronology
The Cockroaches (1987)	Fingertips (1988)	Positive (1991)

Singles from Fingertips
- 1. "Hey What Now!" Released: July 1988; 2. "You and Me" Released: October 1988; 3. "Permanently Single" Released: January 1989

Fingertips is the second studio album by Australian pub rock band the Cockroaches. It was released in October 1988 and peaked at number 32 on the Australian ARIA Chart.

== Track listing ==
No.	Title	Writer(s)	Length
1.	"Hey What Now!"	John Field	2:37
2.	"You and Me"	J. Field	2:45
3.	"Fingertips"	Anthony Field, J. Field	2:18
4.	"Na Na"	J. Field	2:44
5.	"Caveman"	Jeff Fatt, J. Field, Tony Henry, Peter Mackie	2:39
6.	"While We're Apart"	A. Field, J. Field	2:31
7.	"Permanently Single"	J. Field, Paul Field	3:32
8.	"Sorry Again"	Fatt, J. Field	2:27
9.	"Do It"	J. Field	3:05
10.	"Out of My Head"	J. Field, P. Field	2:53
11.	"Voodoo Girl"	J. Field, Mackie	3:07
12.	"The Farmer's Daughter"	Fatt, J. Field, Charles Fisher	2:57
Total length:			34:35

== Charts ==
Chart (1988)	Peak position
Australian Albums (ARIA)	32
