= The Cockroaches (album) =

Studio album by the Cockroaches
- Released: March 1987
- Genre: Pub rock, Pop rock,
- Length: 35:03
- Label: Regular Records, Festival Records
- Producer: Charles Fisher

The Cockroaches chronology
The Cockroaches (1987)	Fingertips (1988)

Singles from The Cockroaches
- 1. "Wait Up" Released: August 1986; 2. "She's the One" Released: January 1987; 3. "Some Kind of Girl" Released: May 1987; 4. "Double Shot (Of My Baby's Love)" Released: September 1987

The Cockroaches is the debut self-titled studio album by Australian pub rock band the Cockroaches. It was released in March 1987 and peaked at number 9 on the Australian Kent Music Report.

== Track listing ==
No.	Title	Writer(s)	Length
1.	"She's the One"	John Field	2:33
2.	"It's Alright"	J. Field, Geoff Morrison	2:44
3.	"Some Kind of Girl"	J. Field, Paul Field	2:50
4.	"I'll Come Running Back"	J. Field, Jeff Fatt	2:34
5.	"Double Shot"	Cyril Vetter, Don Smith	2:40
6.	"Wait Up"	J. Field, Morrison	2:41
7.	"Is It Any Wonder?"	J. Field, P. Field	3:04
8.	"Heaven"	J. Field, Anthony Field, Fatt	4:00
9.	"She Goes On and On"	J. Field, Jack Baldwin	2:53
10.	"Pour Out My Heart"	J. Field, P. Field, Fatt	3:04
11.	"Poison Girl"	J. Field, A. Field, Morrison	3:02
12.	"Another Night Alone"	J. Field	2:58
Total length:			35:03

== Charts ==
Chart (1987)	Peak position
Australian Albums (Kent Music Report)	9

== Certifications ==
Region	Certification	Certified units/sales
Australia (ARIA)	Platinum	70,000^{^}
^{^} Shipments figures based on certification alone.
