= She's the One (The Cockroaches song) =

Single by The Cockroaches

from the album The Cockroaches
- Released: January 1987
- Recorded: 1986
- Studio: Trafalgar (Sydney)
- Genre: New wave
- Length: 2:33
- Label: Regular/Mushroom
- Songwriter(s): John Field
- Producer(s): Charles Fisher

The Cockroaches singles chronology
"Wait Up" (1986)	"She's the One" (1987)	"Some Kind of Girl" (1987)

"She's the One" is a song by Australian pub rock band the Cockroaches. It was released in January 1987 as the second single from the band's self-titled debut studio album. The song peaked at number seven in the Australian Kent Music Report singles chart.

== Background ==
Australian pub rock group the Cockroaches had issued eight non-album singles since their formation in 1979. They signed with an independent label, Regular Records, which issued their debut album The Cockroaches (March 1987). It was produced by Charles Fisher and the line-up was Jeff Fatt on keyboards, John Field on guitar and vocals, Paul Field on vocals, Tony Field on guitar and vocals, Tony Henry on drums and Phil Robinson on bass guitar. From the album they released four singles, "Wait Up" (August 1986), "She's the One" (January 1987), "Some Kind of Girl" (May) and "Double Shot (Of My Baby's Love)" (cover version, September). "She's the One" is the group's highest charting hit, which peaked at No. 7 on the Australian Kent Music Report singles chart.

== Track listing ==
7" single (K 212)'

- Side A "She's the One" (John William Michael Field) – 2:33
- Side B "Can in the Hand" (Geoffrey Vincent Morrison, J. Field)

== Charts ==
=== Weekly charts ===
Chart (1987)	Peak position
Australia (Kent Music Report)	7

=== Year-end charts ===
Chart (1987)	Position
Australia (Kent Music Report)	41
