= She's the One =

She's the One may refer to:

== Films ==
- She's the One (1996 film), an American comedy-drama film
  - Songs and Music from "She's the One", ninth studio album by Tom Petty and the Heartbreakers and soundtrack to the above film
- She's the One (2013 film), a Filipino romantic-comedy film

== Songs ==
=== Singles ===
- "She's the One" (Bruce Springsteen song), 1975
- "She's the One" (Hank Ballard song), a 1955 song covered by James Brown in 1988
- "She's the One" (The Cockroaches song) a 1987 single by the Cockroaches
- "She's the One" (World Party song), a 1997 song covered by Robbie Williams in 1998

=== From albums ===
- "She's the One", a song by Juice WRLD from his album Death Race for Love
- "She's the One", a song by Michael Fall from the 2013 album Turn on your radio
- "She's the One", a song by Roy Harper, included on some versions of his 1968 album Come Out Fighting Ghengis Smith
- "She's the One", a 1964 song by the Chartbusters
- "She's the One", a song by the Ramones from the 1978 album Road to Ruin
- She's the One, a 2004 television special show for the Irish band Westlife
