= Evie and the Birdman =

Australian musical

- Music: John Field
- Lyrics: John Field
- Book: John Field
- Premiere: 3 July 2001: Bondi Pavilion, Sydney

Evie and the Birdman (originally titled Love, Fame, Sex and Money) is an Australian musical written by John Field. It first showed at the Bondi Pavilion (Sydney) from 3–14 July 2001. It then moved to the Mittagong Playhouse for another run a month later. It is set in Tullamana, a fictional country town in Australia.

== Production ==
The cast for the Bondi Pavilion show were Anthony Cogin as "Lester's father", Benj Daddario as "the Birdman", Ryan Desaunier, Amanda Dolby, Sam Moran, Emma Pask, Katrina Retallick as "Evelyn", Alyson Standen as "Miss Yahwhohow" and Alicia Wolfe. For the CD, the part of Miss Yahwhohow was sung by Bernadette Cogin.

It was directed by Jacqueline Fallon and choreographed by Fallon and Leeanne Ashley. It was produced by Caspian Productions via Richard Fallon and Mark Mooney.

== Synopsis ==
=== Act l ===
Two young people, Lester and Evelyn, are preparing to leave their town of Tullamana; Lester is planning to sign a recording contract with the business conglomerate “B.I.G.”, and Evelyn plans to be his manager. However, B.I.G. is planning to use Lester to get out of their own financial problems by using him to crash their market share. With help from PR woman Miss Yahwhowho, they give him the alias "the Birdman", and Evelyn is pushed out of the picture. However, one of the Birdman's songs begins to rise in the charts. B.I.G., not wanting their shares to increase, fire Miss Yahwhowho and publicly ridicule the Birdman. Lester eventually fakes his own death with the help of his father in order to get out of the recording contract.

=== Act ll ===
Five years later, Evelyn has her own current affairs show. Miss Yahwhowho, meanwhile, has become wealthy after founding a "birdcult" dedicated to the supposedly dead Birdman. She uses her funds to buy B.I.G., with the plan to buy out Tullamana and build a casino there. Lester, wanting to prevent this, tries to get onto Evelyn's show to raise attention to the issue. Evelyn and Lester reunite and plan to save the town. On an episode of Evelyn's show, Lester appears as his old Birdman persona, shattering the claims of the "birdcult". Miss Yahwhowho loses her money and ownership of B.I.G is transferred to Lester.

== Musical numbers ==
Act I

- "This Is the Story"
- "What You Gonna Do"
- "A Sucker to Fit"
- "How Do I Begin To Tell You?"
- "Va Va Va Voom"
- "I'm Ready"
- "The Seduction"
- "Tullamana at Noon"
- "I'm Always Your Friend"
- "The Birdman"
- "Chocolate Is the Colour of the Blues"
- "Birdman Faces Extinction"
- "Radio Heads"
- "The Birdman Reprise"
- "Incriminate"
- "The Press Conference"
- "It's Time to Join the World"
- "I'm Going to Be Somebody"

Act II

- "Three Years Later"
- "A Little Town Called Tullamana"
- "Don't You Ever Give Up the Fight"
- "Voveni Pro Avis"
- "I'm Such a Good Bad Girl"
- "Comfortable"
- "Tullamana in Blue"
- "On TV With Evie Tonight"
- "Lights, Camera, Action"
- "One Week In Evie's Apartment"
- "These Are The People I Work For/Finale"
