= Lyn Moran =

American entertainer (born 1978)

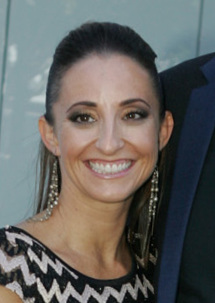
- Lyn Moran at ARIA Music Awards of 2013.
- Born: Lyn Stuckey; November 12, 1978 (age 47); Columbia, South Carolina, U.S.
- Spouse: Sam Moran (m. 2006; div. 2018)

Lyn Moran (née Stuckey born November 12, 1978) is an American entertainer best known for being a cast member of the children's performing group The Wiggles.

== Early life and education ==
Moran was born and raised in Columbia, South Carolina. She studied dance from the age of four and at the age of eight she was participating in national dance competitions.

After receiving the Palmetto Fellows Academic Scholarship in high school, Moran attended the University of Georgia and graduated in 2001 with a BS in genetics.

== The Wiggles ==
In February 2003, Moran began touring with The Wiggles on The Dorothy The Dinosaur Tour as one of the Wiggly Dancers and as Dorothy the Dinosaur. On television, Moran had a recurring role on The Wiggles as Dorothy the Dinosaur on more than twenty episodes shown on the Disney Channel between 2005 and 2006, and also as one of their Friendly Pirates. She last appeared with the Wiggles in late 2008.

== Personal life ==
She married Australian performer Sam Moran, another member of The Wiggles who was the Yellow Wiggle from November 2006 to January 2012. According to news reports, they met in 2003, while working together. Their first child was born in January 2010 in Sydney. They subsequently separated and later divorced in 2018.
