= Wait Up =

Single by The Cockroaches

from the album The Cockroaches
- Released: August 1986
- Recorded: 1986
- Venue: Trafalgar Studios, Sydney
- Label: Mushroom
- Songwriter(s): John Field; Geoff Morrison
- Producer(s): Charles Fisher

The Cockroaches singles chronology
"Another Night Alone" (1985)	"Wait Up" (1986)	"She's the One" (1987)

"Wait Up" is a song by Australian pub rock band The Cockroaches. It was released in August 1986 as the lead single from the band's self-titled debut studio album. The song peaked at number 28 in Australia.

== Track listing ==
7" single (K 72)'

- Side A "Wait Up"
- Side B "Henry's Lizard"

== Charts ==
Chart (1986)	Peak position
Australia (Kent Music Report)	28
