= Hey What Now! =

Single by The Cockroaches

from the album Fingertips
- Released: July 1988
- Recorded: 1988
- Venue: Trafalgar Studios, Sydney
- Label: Mushroom
- Songwriter(s): John Field
- Producer(s): Charles Fisher

The Cockroaches singles chronology
"Double Shot (Of My Baby's Love)" (1987)	"Hey What Now!" (1988)	"You and Me" (1988)

"Hey What Now!" is a song by Australian pub rock band the Cockroaches. It was released in July 1988 as the lead single from the band's second studio album Fingertips. The song peaked at number 28 in Australia.

== Track listing ==
7" single (K 533)'

- Side A "Hey What Now!"
- Side B "Marie"

12" single (X 13327)/ CD Maxi'

- Side A "Hey What Now!" (Extended Hey, Hey mix)
- Side B1 "Hey What Now!" (LP Version)
- Side B2 "Hey What Now!" (991/2 Dub mix)
- Side B3 "Marie"

== Charts ==
Chart (1988)	Peak position
Australia (ARIA)	28
