= The Cockroaches =

Australian pub rock band

Background information
- Origin: Sydney, New South Wales, Australia
- Genres: Pub rock; pop rock; rock & roll; R&B
- Years active: 1979–1994; 1999; 2005; 2014
- Labels: Refugee; EMI; Phantom; Powderworks; Possum; Festival; Regular; Roach
- Spinoffs: The Wiggles
- Past members: Paul Field; John Field; Anthony Field; Tony Henry; Jeff Fatt; Phil Robinson; Peter Mackie; Paul Dunworth; Bruce Hatfield; Geoff O'Reagan; Joseph Hallion

The Cockroaches were an Australian pub rock band primarily active throughout the 1980s. The band was founded in 1979 by the Field brothers—Paul (lead vocals), John (rhythm guitar, vocals), and Anthony (lead guitar, vocals)—and Tony Henry on drums and Joseph Hallion on saxophone. They were joined in 1981 by Jeff Fatt on keyboards. In 1986, they signed with an independent label, Regular Records, which issued their first three albums, including The Cockroaches (March 1987), which peaked at No. 9 on the Australian Kent Music Report Albums Chart; it sold 70,000 copies and was certified platinum by their label. The album spawned the single "She's the One", which became the band's biggest hit when it peaked at No. 7 on the Kent Music Report Singles Chart in April 1987. In 1988, The Daily Telegraph described the Cockroaches, who played over 300 gigs a year, as the "Hardest Working Rock'n'Roll Band" in the country.

In September 1988, the band was promoting their second album, Fingertips, when Paul's infant daughter died of SIDS. Although devastated, the group continued with a lower profile, and Anthony left to resume his university studies yet returned periodically to record their later studio albums. Early in 1991, Anthony and Fatt founded a children's music group, the Wiggles. The Cockroaches alumni served as musical and performing support for the new group; John wrote much of their music, Paul became their manager, and Henry performed with them. The Wiggles used many of the Cockroaches' business practices and reworked some of their songs into the children's music genre.

The Cockroaches released their third album, Positive, in June 1991 and left their label by the end of that year. In March 1994 they issued their fourth album, St. Patrick's Day 10am, on their own Roach Records. Australian musicologist Glenn A. Baker described their sound as "rangy, loose-limbed, good-natured, energetic, self-effacing, intuitive, harmonic, melodic, enduring, soused and fiercely frantic".

Members of the Cockroaches have pursued other music careers with John and Paul forming the Field Brothers, John forming his own band called the John Field Band and writing plays and musicals, and Henry working as a session musician. A compilation album, Hey Let's Go – The Best of the Cockroaches was released by Festival Records in 1999.

== History ==
=== 1979: Formation ===
The Cockroaches (also called the Cockies) were founded in 1979 by the Field brothers (Paul on lead vocals, John on rhythm guitar and vocals, and Anthony (or "Tony") on lead guitar and vocals), while they were students at St. Joseph's College, a Sydney boarding school. According to Paul Field, the Field brothers grew up in a large family, with seven children. The brothers were each born one year apart, so they were very close. Paul said that he and all their siblings were taught music from a young age. Religion was an important part of their family as well; their entire family were involved in their local Catholic parish, which included playing music for services.

Other founders of the Cockroaches were Tony Henry on drums and Joseph Hallion on saxophone; they were joined by Bruce Hatfield on bass guitar by mid-1980. After Paul introduced his brothers to the Rolling Stones, the band took their name from an obscure alias used by Keith Richards during the 1960s because, according to Anthony Field, "it sounded kind of punkish and that scene was blossoming in Sydney at the time". Australian rock historian Ian McFarlane called the band's name "a fitting choice, due mostly to the good-time R&B material that The Cockroaches played during their formative years". One of their first gigs was at their school; Paul convinced the Marist Brothers, who ran St. Joseph's, to allow a charge for the performance. Their proceeds were "donated to 'the missions'". Paul booked their initial performances at local pubs, which, despite some of the member's under-age status, allowed them to perform. Anthony later said, "It was insane, it was fantastic. It was frightening. We didn't realise our playing was so rudimentary, but it didn't matter...Our inadequacies were made up by our spirit". According to Daniel Fallon, who toured with the band, the Cockroaches honed their craft as they performed on stage.

=== 1980–1985: Beginnings ===
By early 1980, the Cockroaches began writing their own music as well as covering various 1960s rock 'n' roll artists, especially the Rolling Stones. In July 1980, they issued their debut single, "I Want a Leather Jacket", on the Refugee Records label. The song was written by Paul, was produced by Greg Owens and the band, and was recorded at their school and at Studio B in Bondi. According to Australian musicologist, Glenn A. Baker, the track provided "the aura of a rockabilly band ... [but] they have always been much closer in style to the original cocky, bluesy, strident Stones". When they recorded their second single, "Bingo Bango" in June 1981, Hatfield had been replaced by Geoff O'Reagan on bass guitar. This song was written by John and Anthony, was produced by Owens and was recorded at Wirra-Willa Studios. By August of that year Jeff Fatt had joined on keyboards and Phil Robinson became their bass guitarist. According to Anthony, Fatt had been a member of "a seminal Sydney rockabilly band called the Roadmasters", and had joined "to fight boredom". They had hired Fatt and his brother to manage their sound system during gigs. Anthony declared this began "a beautiful three-decade relationship that has made him a very wealthy man". Their early road manager was Graham Kennedy, former guitarist-vocalist for the hard rock band, Finch.

"What the Cockroaches had over many other bands was an ability to connect with their audience. John and Anthony inspired anarchy—one minute leading a scene from Les Misérables or recreating John F Kennedy's assassination on stage, and the next making up a song on the spot (such as "Do the Monkey"). Paul was a powerful singer and leader who kept the gig from descending into mayhem. Jeff was a gifted keyboard player and the rhythm section was tight. It didn't hurt that all of the band members were handsome, as well." – Cockroaches saxophonist Daniel Fallon

According to Anthony, Paul was "a picture of professional efficiency", whereas John, one of the top Under-19 New South Wales cricketers, was the showman of the group. John's performances on-stage built the Cockroaches' reputation for being a party-band, even though alcohol and drug use was not part of their personal lifestyles. Paul, who returned to St Andrews as a teacher, noted about the band's early days, "We had a good following around the unis, pubs and colleges. We had a reputation as a good live act". Anthony credited Paul and John for the band's reputation. He described Paul as "very serious, straight up and down and a really solid rock singer" who was known for his jumps and acrobatics on stage, and John as carefree, charismatic, a talented pop music writer, and a natural leader of both the band and their audience. Paul reported that the 1980s was a vibrant time for local music in Sydney, and that the group gained additional exposure by performing on TV shows like Simon Townsend and Hey, Hey it's Saturday. Their success forced Paul to give up teaching to devote his energies on touring full-time.

The group released five further singles on a range of labels: EMI, Phantom, Powderworks, and Possum Records. One of these, "See You in Spain", with Powderworks, appeared on the Australian Kent Music Report Singles Chart Top 100 in July 1984. "See You in Spain" was written by Fatt, Robinson and John; it was produced by Robert Moss at Emerald City Studios. In 1986, the Cockroaches signed with an independent label, Regular Records, and were distributed by Festival Records. At that time, Phil Carson was filling in for Robinson as their bass guitarist.

=== 1986–1987: Rise to success and The Cockroaches ===
The group's first single with Regular, "Wait Up" (August 1986), reached No. 28 on the Kent Music Report Singles Chart and No. 13 in the Sydney charts.

The band's debut album, The Cockroaches was released in March 1987 and featured Robinson on bass guitar. The album was produced by Charles Fisher, who had worked with other artists such as Radio Birdman, Hoodoo Gurus, Martin Plaza; one track was produced by Roy Nicolson. Other singles included: "She's the One", which appeared on the charts in January; "Some Kind of Girl", in May; and "Double Shot (Of My Baby's Love)", a cover version of the 1964 single by Dick Holler & the Holidays in August. The album sold 10,000 in its first 10 days after its release, reached No. 9 on the Kent Music Report Albums Chart, and in 1988, was awarded a platinum certification by their record label for sales of 70,000 copies. "She's the One" became the band's biggest hit when it peaked at No. 7 in April 1987. "Some Kind of Girl" and "Double Shot (Of My Baby's Love)" also made the Top 40. Peter Mackie became the bass guitarist in 1987. Phillip McIntyre of Texas and the Big Beat Radio website described Mackie's time with the Cockroaches as "[h]is most successful period as a player".

According to Anthony, in the late 1980s, the group averaged over 300 gigs a year throughout Australia. They performed at town halls, concert halls, Bachelor and Spinster (B&S) balls, parties, and pubs; and were "one of the biggest crowd-drawing groups in Australia". They toured with Mental As Anything, the Hoodoo Gurus, and INXS. In 1988, The Daily Telegraph surveyed booking agencies and described the band as the "Hardest Working Rock'n'Roll Band in the Country". Australian musicologist Ian McFarlane described the Cockroaches as "an in-demand pub band [that built] a sweaty, frenzied atmosphere with good old-fashioned showmanship and unpretentious, energetic rock'n'pop". Paul said that the group "rode the last wave of the pub rock era". Anthony claimed they were "shunned" by the major record companies in Australia. Even after their debut album was certified gold, they remained independent: they organised their own shows and paid expenses from their own accounts.

=== 1988–1999: Later years, Fingertips, Positive, St. Patrick's Day 10am & break up ===
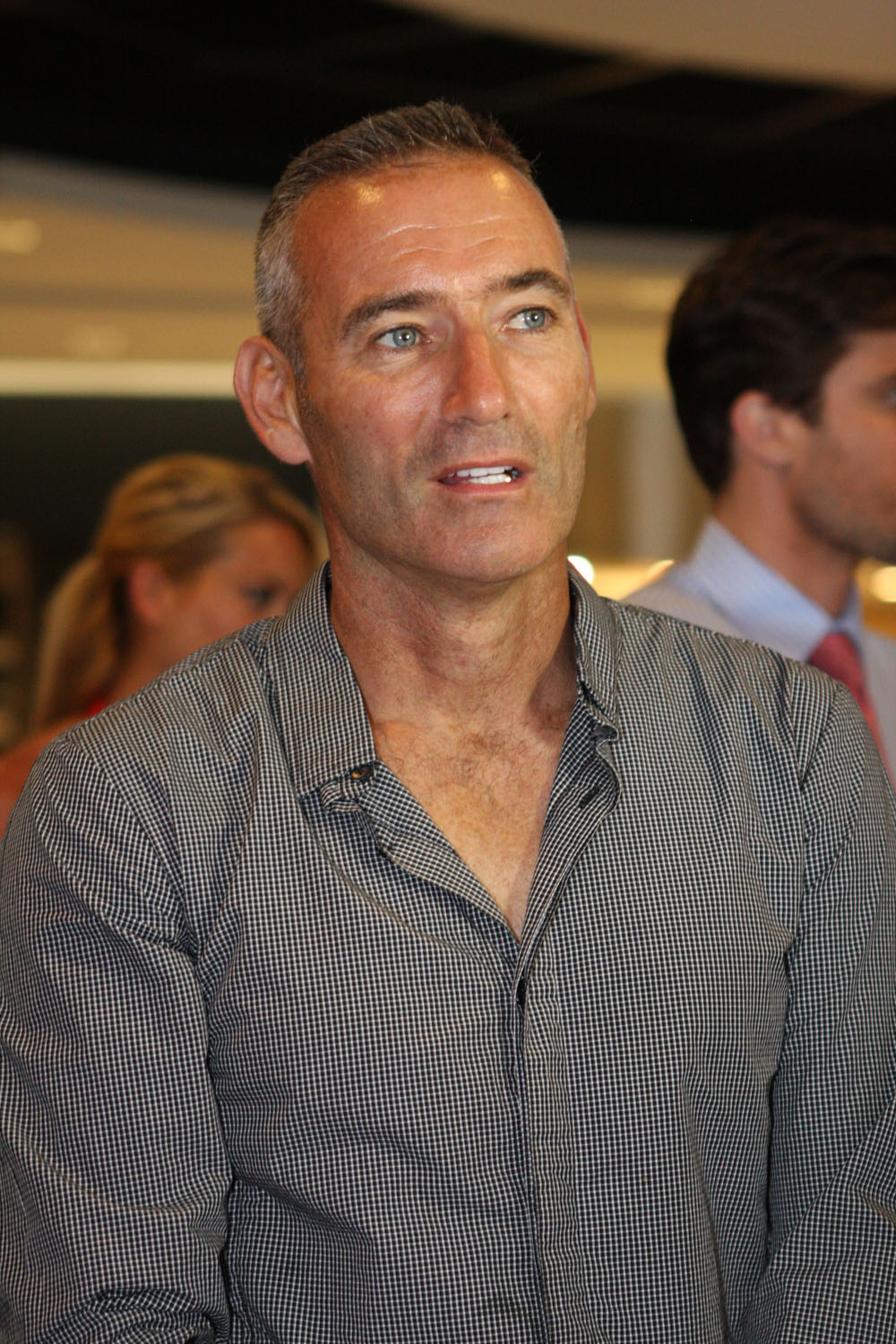
Anthony Field, pictured in 2012

The Cockroaches recorded their second album, Fingertips, in 1988. Fisher producing the album with Festival, at Alberts Digital Studios in Trafalgar. The album peaked at No. 32 on the ARIA Albums Chart. The line-up consisted of the three Field Brothers, Fatt, Henry and Mackie. According to Anthony, they were disappointed with the album and regretted giving over much of its sound to the producers, but toured heavily to promote it. Fingertips produced their next four singles, including "Hey What Now!" – written by John – which reached the Top 40. The group appeared at the World Expo 88 in May 1988, before a crowd of 92,000 attendees. In September that year, while the band were touring for the album, Paul Field's eight-month-old daughter, Bernadette, died of SIDS. Paul recalled, "Nothing was the same after [my daughter's death], it crushed me and left us all wounded". Anthony left the group to return to Macquarie University and continue his studies in early childhood education, but Paul returned to performing "in order to feed his family, sometimes with some of the original band members, other times not". Early in 1989, the Cockroaches toured in Australia with Mental As Anything, also produced by the Regular label.

The group recorded a third album, Positive, which came out in June 1991. It was produced by Mark Moffatt, who had also worked with Mental As Anything and Jenny Morris. The album produced three singles, including the gospel-flavoured track, "Hope" (August 1990), "I Must Have Been Blind" (May 1991), and a cover of the Brenda Lee song, "Here Comes That Feeling" (August 1991). Their version of the Brenda Lee song was featured in the 1990 film, The Crossing, starring Russell Crowe and Danielle Spencer. According to McFarlane, "By the end of the year ... The Cockroaches as a band concept had run its course". However, journalist Glenn A. Baker, in the liner notes for the group's March 1994 album, St. Patrick's Day 10am, states, "The Cockroaches never went away, they just keep playing, very much in the mode of their earlier days". He also declared, "The sound of the Cockies seems to embody all of the basic concepts of rock'n'roll as we've always known and loved it. Its rangy, loose-limbed, good-natured, energetic, self-effacing, intuitive, harmonic, melodic, enduring, soused and fiercely frantic". The performers for the album were: the three Field brothers; Fatt on Hammond organ, keyboards and cow noises; Henry on drums and cabasa; Mackie on bass guitar and backing vocals; with additional backing vocals by Jane Bezzina, Greg Truman and Steve Pomfrett. It was recorded at the Tracking Station and Noisegate Studios, was mixed by Pomfrett and John, was engineered by Pomfrett, and was produced by the band.

In November 1999 Festival Records issued a compilation album, Hey Let's Go – The Best of the Cockroaches, which included a newly recorded track, "Something Good This Way Comes".

== Afterwards and The Wiggles ==
In early 1991, Anthony Field founded The Wiggles, a children's music group, with fellow university students Murray Cook and Greg Page (who was the Cockroaches' roadie), Phillip Wilcher (from Macquarie University's music department) and the Cockroaches' bandmate, Jeff Fatt. In July, they issued their debut album, The Wiggles, which was dedicated to Paul Field's daughter and sold 70,000 copies. The Wiggles went on to become "a global powerhouse in children's entertainment". They used former the Cockroaches' members for musical and performing support: Paul, John, and Henry (Wiggles' character Henry the Octopus was named after him) performed with them on their CDs, DVDs, and stage shows. John helped them write many of their songs. Many early Wiggles songs were the Cockroaches' tunes reworked to fit the genre of children's music. According to Anthony, "The Wiggles music isn't all that far removed from what we did in The Cockroaches, just a different subject matter ... The Cockroaches sing about girls and love and stuff like that; The Wiggles sing about hot potatoes and cold spaghetti". Paul worked for James Roland Wood, Chief Judge at Common Law, for three years after the band stopped regularly performing and during the Wiggles' formation, which he said gave Anthony time to develop his new band alone, without much input from his brothers. In the mid-1990s, Paul became the Wiggles' talent manager.

"Do the Monkey"
"Do the Monkey", recorded by the Cockroaches in 1989. With very little changes, it is almost the same as the Wiggles' version, showing how the Wiggles revamped many songs in the Cockroaches' library

"Do the Monkey"
Originally a Cockroaches tune, one of the many songs in the Cockroaches' library that was changed from Australian pop to children's music

In addition to his work with the Wiggles, John founded the John Field Band, an eight-piece covers band with John on lead vocals, Bernadette Cogin on lead vocals (later replaced by Bronwyn Mulcahy), Dom Lindsay on trumpet, former Cockroaches member Dan Fallon on tenor saxophone, Roy Ferin on trombone, Mark Rohanna on piano, Matt Morrison on drums, and Chris Lupton on bass guitar. John wrote the musicals Evie and the Birdman (July 2001) and Who Loves Me.

Since 2006, Tony Henry has been a manager in the student services office at International College of Management, Sydney and has performed drums for the Wiggles' recordings. As a session musician Henry has worked for Ross Wilson, Slim Dusty, Crowded House and Mental As Anything. As of 2008, Peter Mackie has recorded three solo albums: What–Me Sing?! (2001), Late Starter (2003), and The Spinning Man (2006).

On 29 January 2005, the Cockroaches reunited for a one-time performance at the Hills for Hope concert as a benefit for the Boxing Day Tsunami survivors. Also on the roster were the Greg Page Band, Mental As Anything and Hush. In 2011, Paul and John Field founded the Field Brothers as a duo and recorded their debut album, 1964. Some of the Cockroaches' songs were re-recorded as country songs, including "She's Some Kind of Girl", "Rely on Me", and "Permanently Single". The album included duets with other country music artists: Troy Cassar-Daley, Shane Nicholson, Amber Lawrence, and Dianna Corcoran.

== 2014 reunion ==
The group's entire catalogue was released digitally in 2014. To mark the occasion, the original line-up of the band reunited for two shows in June 2014 at RSL clubs in Sydney. Hey Let's Go!, a greatest hits album covering their 1984–94 material, was re-released on 13 June 2014 through ABC/Universal.

== Members ==
- Paul Field – lead vocals, occasional guitar (1979–1994, 2014)
- John Field – rhythm and lead guitar, backing and lead vocals (1979–1994, 2014)
- Anthony Field – lead and rhythm guitar, backing and lead vocals (1979-1988, 1990-1991, 1994, 2014)
- Jeff Fatt – keyboards, piano, backing vocals (1981-1991, 1994, 2014)
- Tony Henry – drums, backing vocals (1979–1994, 2014)
- Phil Robinson – bass, backing vocals (1981–1988, 2014)
- Peter Mackie – bass (1988–1994), rhythm guitar (2014), backing vocals (1988–1994, 2014)
- Paul Dunworth – bass (1979–1980)
- Joseph Hallion – saxophone (1979–1985)
- Bruce Hatfield – bass (1980)
- Geoff O'Reagan – bass (1981)

== Discography ==
=== Albums ===
==== Studio albums ====
List of albums, with selected chart positions and certifications
Title	Album details	Peak chart positions	Certifications (sales thresholds)
Title	Album details	AUS	Certifications (sales thresholds)
The Cockroaches	Released: March 1987; Label: Regular Records, Festival Records (L 38709, RMC 53237, CD 53237); Formats: LP, MC, CD	9	AUS: Platinum
Fingertips	Released: 1988; Label: Regular Records, Festival Records (TVL 93270, TVC 93270, D 53270); Formats: LP, MC, CD	32	
Positive	Released: June 1991; Label: Regular Records, Festival Records (D 19737); Formats: LP, CD	121	
St. Patrick's Day 10am	Released: March 1994; Label: Roach Records (CD ROACH 001); Formats: CD	–	
"—" denotes a recording that did not chart or was not released in that territory.

==== Compilation albums ====
List of albums, with selected chart positions and certifications
Title	Album details	Peak chart positions
Title	Album details	AUS
Hey Let's Go! The Best of the Cockroaches	Released: November 1999; Label: Festival Records (D 26394); Formats: CD	236

=== Singles ===
List of singles, with selected chart positions, showing year released and album name
Title	Year	Peak chart positions	Album
Title	Year	AUS	Album
"I Want a Leather Jacket" / "Blue Moon of Kentucky"	1980	–	Non-album singles
"Through with Her" / "Bingo Bango"	1981	–	Non-album singles
"Used to Be"	1981	–	Non-album singles
"Empty Heart"	1981	–	Non-album singles
"Shake Jump and Shout"	1982	–	Non-album singles
"See You in Spain"	1984	97	Non-album singles
"My Whole World's Fallin' Down"	1985	–	Non-album singles
"Another Night Alone"	1985	–	Non-album singles
"Wait Up"	1986	28	The Cockroaches
"She's the One"	1987	7	The Cockroaches
"Some Kind of Girl"	1987	32	The Cockroaches
"Double Shot (Of My Baby's Love)"	1987	32	The Cockroaches
"Hey What Now!"	1988	28	Fingertips
"You and Me"	1988	44	Fingertips
"Permanently Single"	1989	99	Fingertips
"Another Saturday Night"	1989	83	non album single
"Hope"	1990	126	Positive
"Here Comes That Feeling"	1990	–	Positive
"I Must Have Been Blind"	1991	162	Positive
"Something Good This Way Comes"	1999	–	The Best of the Cockroaches, Hey Let's Go!
"—" denotes a recording that did not chart or was not released in that territory.
