= Phillip Wilcher =

Australian musician (born 1958)

- Born: 16 March 1958 (age 68); Camperdown, New South Wales
- Occupations: Pianist, Composer, Actor
- Years active: 1991–present
- Website: phillipwilcher.com

Phillip Wilcher (born 16 March 1958) is an Australian pianist and composer. Wilcher was one of the youngest composers in Australia, and was first published at the age of 17. Wilcher was one of the founding members of The Wiggles, but left the group shortly after the group's debut album in 1991. He has had a successful career as a composer and performer of classical music.

== Early life ==
Phillip Wilcher was born in Camperdown, New South Wales. He started playing the piano at age 8, and at 14 the Sydney-based music company J. Albert & Son recorded his first composition, entitled "Daybreak", making him the youngest published composer in Australia. He was a student of composer and musicologist Franz Holford, who was also J. Albert & Son's editor, for seven years, and his associate for over twenty years. One of the songs from Wilcher's first recording, "Archie's Theme", was recorded by The Wiggles on their debut album in 1991. Wilcher recorded "Autumn Rain" when he was 17, also with Albert & Son, and studied with classical musicians Neta Maughan and Elpis Liossatos, and began a thirty-year association with composer Miriam Hyde. In 1976, at the age of 18, Wilcher became an assistant editor for J. Albert & Son's Classical division. He also worked for the Australian Broadcasting Corporation (ABC) for many years in the 1980s.

== The Wiggles ==
In 1991, while working with the early childhood music department at Macquarie University, Wilcher met musician and former member of the Australian rock group The Cockroaches, Anthony Field, who was studying child development. According to Wilcher, Field asked him to join The Wiggles, which would become "Australia's foremost children's entertainment act", and to help them produce their first album "The Wiggles". Wilcher claimed that he financed and "contributed the most musically to the debut album" He also performed in a few of the group's videos. In 1992, he left The Wiggles and submitted a letter of resignation because he wanted to continue composing classical music. By the late 1990s, The Wiggles re-recorded their first album and removed Wilcher's compositions from it. The group's webpage does not mention Wilcher's contribution, although the Australian Record Industry Association (ARIA) awarded him gold and platinum awards for the album. Wilcher has also been called "the fifth Wiggle" by many in the press for his part in the early history of the group.

== Later career ==
Wilcher, whose career has been called "an eclectic mix of classical and flim-flam", has been invited three times to play for the Liberace Foundation in Las Vegas, and composed the music the lyrics of poet and librettist Jack Larson. Pianist Jeanell Carrigan has recorded four CDs of his piano compositions, and the ABC and the radio station 2MBS has broadcast Wilcher's music often. Wilcher has composed music for pianist Aaron McMillan, musician and Clive Robertson. His works has been featured on several CDs released by Jade Music, and has had an active public speaking career. In 2007, Wilcher composed "1791", a work honouring Mozart on the anniversary of his death, which was performed by oboist Rachel Tolmie and conducted by David Angell. He is an elected life member of APRA and a board member of the Australian Music Teacher Magazine, for whom he has written articles about Chopin, Brahms, Ravel, and music education.
