= Anthony Field =

Australian musician and actor (born 1963)

Anthony Field AM
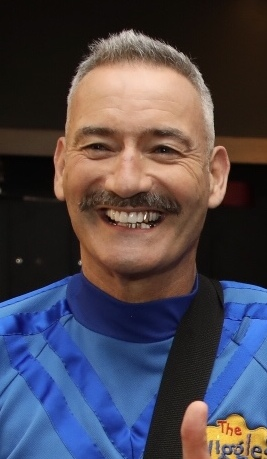
- Field in 2018

Background information
- Born: Anthony Donald Joseph Field; 8 May 1963 (age 63); Kellyville, New South Wales, Australia
- Origin: Sydney, New South Wales Australia
- Genres: Children's; pop; rock
- Occupations: Musician; actor; songwriter; producer
- Instruments: Guitar; drums; vocals; violin; didgeridoo; theremin; congas; bouzouki; mandolin; banjo; bagpipes; trumpet; bass; tin whistle
- Years active: 1979–present
- Member of: The Wiggles
- Formerly of: the Cockroaches
- Spouse: Miki Patisteas (m. 2003)
- Children: 3, including Lucia Field
- Website: https://www.thewiggles.com/

Anthony Donald Joseph Field AM (born 8 May 1963) is an Australian musician, actor, songwriter and producer. He is best known as the leader of the children's group the Wiggles and a member of the 1980s and 1990s pop band the Cockroaches. While still a teenager, he helped found the Cockroaches with his brothers, Paul and John. The Cockroaches recorded two albums and enjoyed moderate success, interrupted by Field's service in the Army, until they disbanded in the late 1980s.

Field attended Macquarie University to receive training in early childhood education, and founded the Wiggles with fellow students Murray Cook, Greg Page and former bandmate Jeff Fatt in 1991. He worked as a preschool teacher for two years before the success of the Wiggles led him to focus on children's music full-time. The Wiggles became one of the most successful and active groups in Australia. Field, who wears a blue shirt while performing with the Wiggles, was responsible for the production aspects of their stage and television shows, albums, and DVDs. His issues with chronic pain and depression, which almost forced him out of the group at the height of their success, are well-documented. After the departure of Cook, Fatt, and Page in 2012, he is the only remaining original Wiggle.

== Early life and education ==
Anthony Donald Joseph Field was born on May 8, 1963 in Kellyville, New South Wales, Australia. He is the youngest of seven children, and grew up in north western Sydney. He came from a long line of musicians, especially the women in his family. His great-great aunt was Queenie Paul, known for performing at the Tivoli Theatre in Sydney, and his grandmother Kathleen accompanied silent movies in the mining town of Cobar. Field's mother, Marie, made sure that all of her seven children learned how to play at least one musical instrument. He attended the all-boys boarding school St Joseph's College, which his great-grandfather Paddy Condon, an Italian immigrant and master stonemason, helped build.

He was inspired by his sister Colleen to study early childhood education, and became convinced that teaching preschool children "was my calling". He was also attracted to the profession's freedom, artistic nature, and lack of discipline, which was different from his experience in boarding school. Field put off university when the Cockroaches became successful, but he was dissatisfied with touring and plagued by "perhaps irrational, but very real, feelings of inadequacy and depression".

By his mid-twenties, he decided that he did not want to tour any longer, so he took two breaks. His first break was as an infantry soldier, rifleman, stretcher bearer, and ambulance driver in the 5th/7th Battalion, Royal Australian Regiment, Australia's regular army from 1982 to 1985. He played the bagpipes in parades and on training missions, but ended his military service in July 1985 and suffered from a bad back as a result of his training. He also went backpacking in the U.K., listening to roots music, to children's music by artists like Raffi, and to recordings of children's books.

== The Cockroaches ==
In 1979, while they were students at St Joseph's, he and his brothers Paul and John formed the pop group the Cockroaches.

In 1986 they signed with an independent label, Regular Records, which issued their first three albums, including The Cockroaches (March 1987), which peaked at No. 9 on the Australian Kent Music Report Albums Chart; it sold 70,000 copies and was certified platinum by their label. The album spawned the single "She's the One", which became the band's biggest hit when it peaked at No. 7 on the Kent Music Report Singles Chart in April 1987.

When the Cockroaches disbanded in the early 1990s, Field enrolled at Macquarie University. While at university, he decided to record an album of children's music, enlisting the assistance of fellow student and guitarist Murray Cook, former Cockroaches roadie and vocalist Greg Page, former bandmate and keyboardist Jeff Fatt, and Macquarie instructor and composer Phillip Wilcher, who later left the group.

== The Wiggles ==
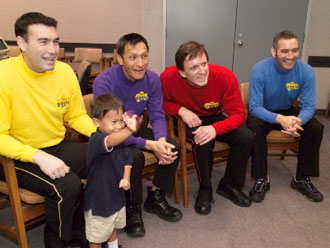
Field (right/blue shirt) with the original line-up of the Wiggles, during a trip to NASA in 2004.

The Wiggles recorded their first CD in 1991; it sold 100,000 copies. Field worked as a preschool teacher for two years before the success of the Wiggles and their extensive touring schedule, which he strongly disliked, forced him to quit. After the production of their second album, the Wiggles adopted colour-coded shirts to wear on stage. According to Field, he wore blue because Cook and Fatt already owned shirts in their colours of red and purple respectively, so he and Page "met in a Sydney department store and literally raced to see who got the blue shirt". Page ended up wearing a yellow shirt and Field originally wore a green polo shirt, but changed to blue to avoid clashing with Dorothy the Dinosaur.

Each Wiggle developed a "schtick" based on their actual behaviours, which evolved into caricatures, and served the same purpose as the uniforms in differentiating their characters and making them memorable to young children; Field's was eating. Field created and played the original Captain Feathersword; the role was taken over by Paul Paddick in 1996. Field also played Wags the Dog.

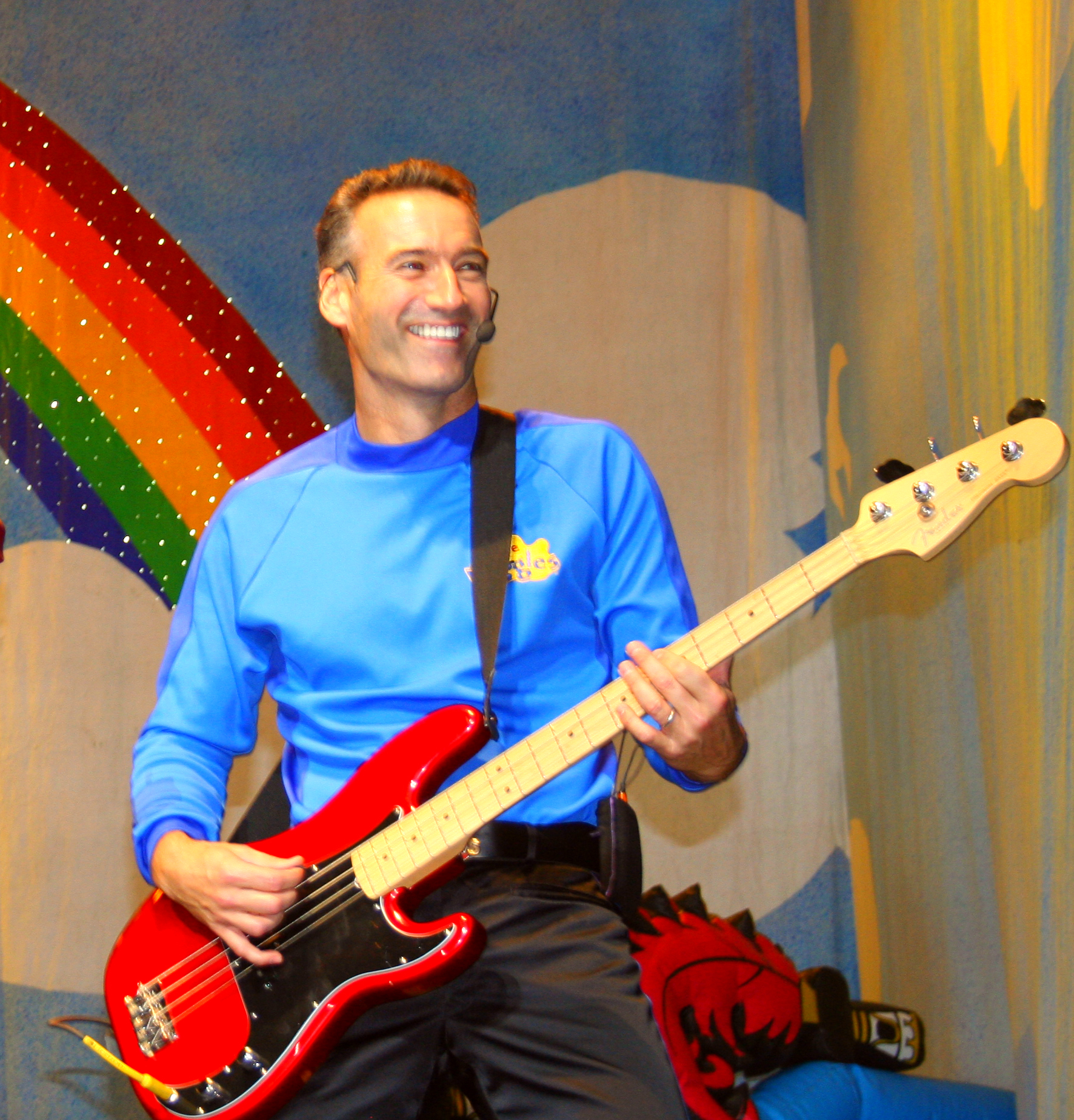
Field on stage in 2007

By the mid-1990s, despite the success of the Wiggles, Field reported being suicidal and "frequently gripped by anxiety, sadness, and negativity". By mid-2004, shortly after his marriage and the birth of his first child, Field's serious medical issues, worsened by their heavy tour schedule, caused him to consider quitting or re-inventing the Wiggles, despite their great success in the U.K. and North America. After meeting chiropractor James Stoxen in Chicago in 2004, Field improved his health to the point that he was able to continue. He began to hire teams of chiropractors for himself, his fellow bandmembers, and castmembers in every city they performed, which he credited with making it possible for them to fulfill their touring requirements. In early 2013, Field became the only original member of the group to remain after Fatt, Cook, and Page retired. He remained in the group because he wanted to continue to educate children and as Wiggles manager Paul Field stated, "to placate American, British and Canadian business partners".

In July 2020, he and the other classic Wiggles appeared in the Soul Movers music video for "Circles Baby".

Field's musical influences include Lightning Hopkins, Elvis Presley, and The Rolling Stones. He plays several instruments, including the tin whistle, bagpipes, guitar, drums, trumpet, violin, bouzouki, banjo and didgeridoo. Field, with input from the other members, produced most of the Wiggles' music, DVDs, and live shows.

== Other projects ==
In 2018, Field, along with fellow Wiggles member Lachlan Gillespie and band members Oliver Brian and David O'Reilly, started a band for adult fans called the Unusual Commoners, which played a mixture of traditional Australian, Irish, English, Scottish and folk songs. They performed their first international show in St. John's, Newfoundland in late 2018.

== Personal life ==
In 1999, Field was named "Bachelor of the Year" in Cleo.

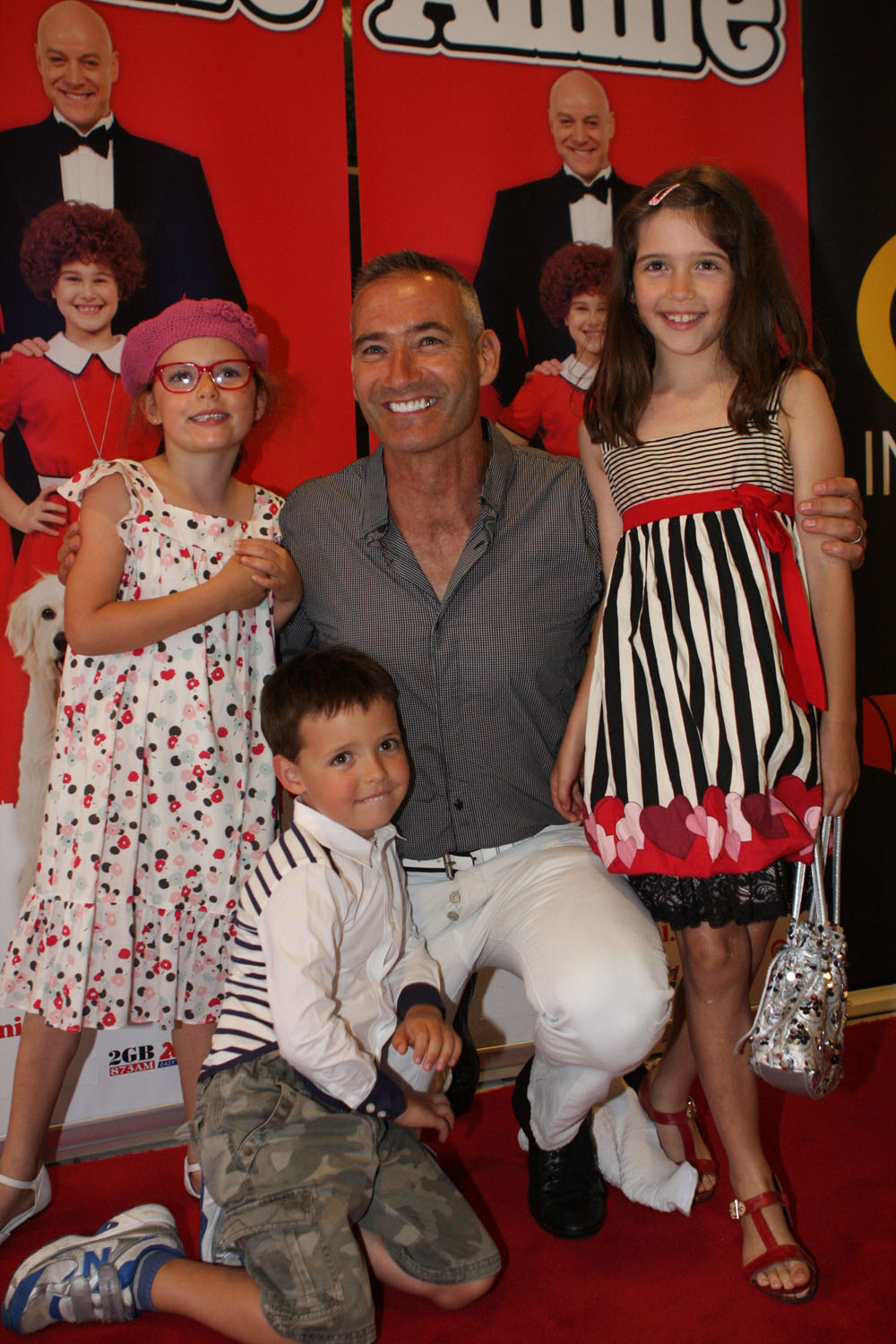
Field with his kids

In 2003, he married Michaela Patisteas, a former dancer whose family owned Griffiths Coffee in Melbourne. They have three children, who have joined the Field family business by appearing in several of the Wiggles' TV shows and videos.

Beginning in 2007, Field, who is a registered breeder of Miniature Fox Terriers, did voiceover work for the TV show RSPCA Animal Rescue for Channel 7 in Australia.

Field, in describing his enthusiasm for competitive sports, has stated, "My love of cricket is abiding", a sport that "instills the same loyalty and passions in me as I know baseball does for many in North America". He is a fan of the Wests Tigers, an Australian Rugby League joint venture club between the Balmain Tigers and Western Suburbs Magpies, but has publicly stated his heart lies with Balmain. In 2023, he publicly revealed his dream of buying and resurrecting Balmain as a stand alone club He is also a fan of singer Julio Iglesias. As Field's fitness improved, to the point that his training regimen became comparable to that of an elite athlete, he gained an interest in gymnastics and acrobatics.

Field went public about his experience with clinical depression in mid-2007 to draw more attention to the condition. He has stated that "being on the road is a dangerous job for someone with depression", but has dealt with it through diet, exercise, talking about it, and having a good support system (including his father before his death in 1998, his wife, and his friend Murray Cook, among his bandmates). He chronicled his health struggles and how he overcame them in his 2012 book How I Got My Wiggle Back.

Field is a devout Catholic, something that he reported helped him deal with his chronic health issues and depression, especially the spiritual practices of prayer and devotion to the Virgin Mary as expressed by Our Lady of Guadalupe. He has two large tattoos on his arms: one is the Virgin Mary with the words "My life is in your hands" in Spanish; the other is a heart with the words, "My love, my heart" in Spanish. The names of his wife and his three children are also tattooed on his arms. He admits that he got his tattoo of the Virgin, which he hid from fans for a long time, during a visit to Mexico while on tour in North America, in the middle of a bout with chronic pain and dental problems, as he put it, "in a moment of madness".

== Awards ==
Field was made a Member of the Order of Australia on 26 January 2010 "for service to the arts, particularly children's entertainment, and to the community as a benefactor and supporter of a range of charities".

== Filmography ==
=== Television ===
Year	Television	Role	Notes	Ref
1998–present	The Wiggles	Anthony Wiggle		
2020–present	Bluey	Rusty's Dad / Postie	Voice roles	

== Discography ==
=== With The Cockroaches ===
==== Studio albums ====
Title	Year
The Cockroaches	1987
Fingertips	1988
Positive	1991
St. Patrick's Day 10am	1994

==== Singles ====
Title	Year
"I Want a Leather Jacket" / "Blue Moon of Kentucky"	1980
"Through with Her" / "Bingo Bango"	1981
"Used to Be"	1981
"Empty Heart"	1981
"Shake Jump and Shout"	1982
"See You in Spain"	1984
"My Whole World's Fallin' Down"	1985
"Another Night Alone"	1985
"Wait Up"	1986
"She's the One"	1987
"Some Kind of Girl"	1987
"Double Shot (Of My Baby's Love)"	1987
"Hey What Now!"	1988
"You and Me"	1988
"Hope"	1990
"Here Comes That Feeling"	1990
"I Must Have Been Blind"	1991

== Works cited ==
- Field, Anthony; Truman, Greg (2012). How I Got My Wiggle Back: A Memoir of Healing. Hoboken, New Jersey: John Wiley & Sons. ISBN 978-1-118-01933-7.
