= Jeff Fatt =

Australian musician and actor (born 1953)

Jeff Fatt AM
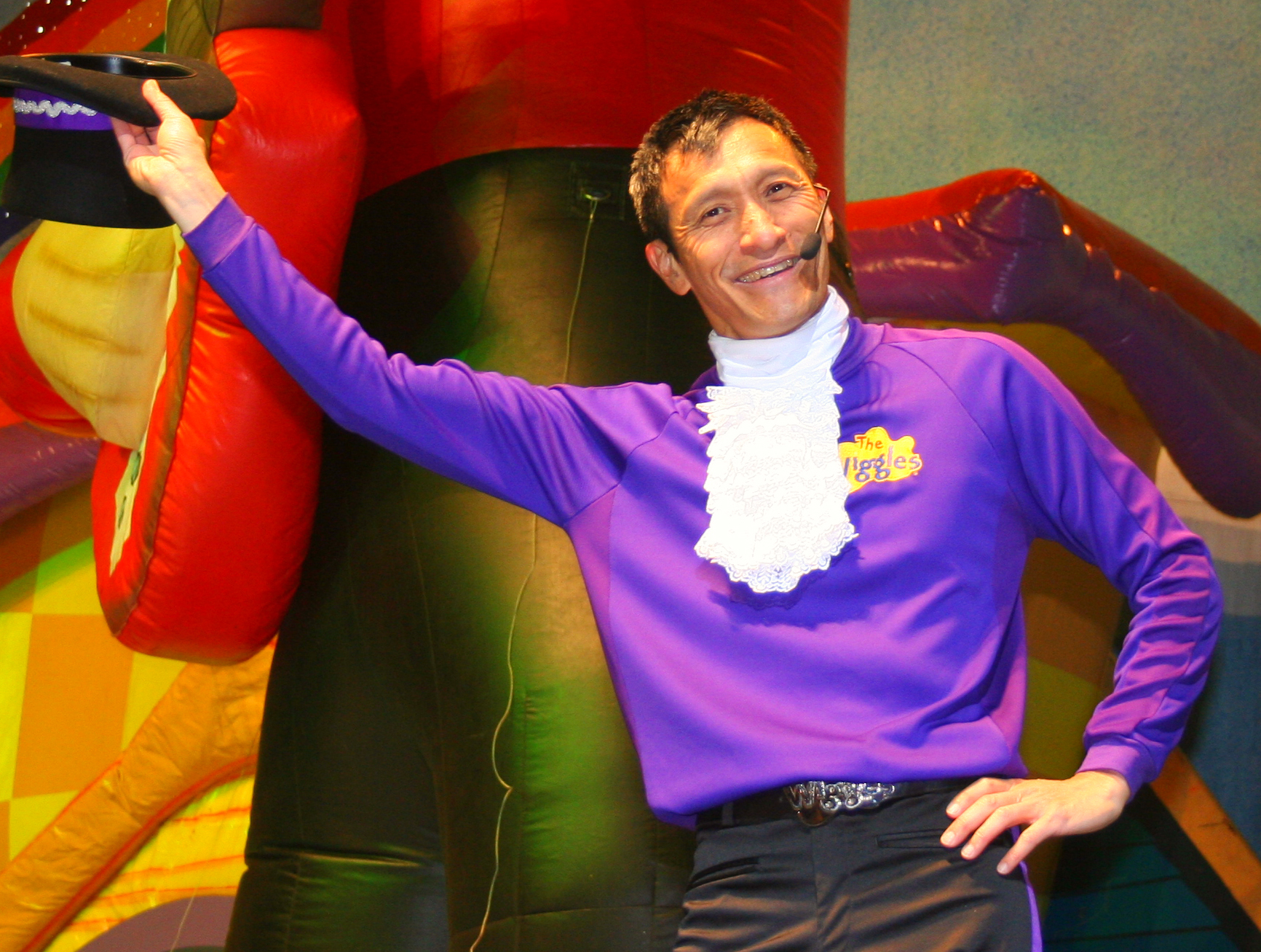
- Fatt in 2007

Background information
- Born: Jeffrey Wayne Fatt; 21 July 1953 (age 73); Casino, New South Wales, Australia
- Genres: Children's; rock
- Occupations: Musician; actor
- Instruments: Keyboards; accordion; vocals
- Years active: 1981–present
- Formerly of: The Cockroaches; The Wiggles

Chinese name
- Traditional Chinese: 關偉剛
- Simplified Chinese: 关伟刚
Transcriptions
Standard Mandarin
- Hanyu Pinyin: Guān Wěigāng
Yue: Cantonese
- Jyutping: Gwaan^{1} Wai^{5}gong^{1}

Jeffrey Wayne Fatt AM (born 21 July 1953) is an Australian musician and actor. He was a member of the children's group The Wiggles from its founding in 1991 to 2012, and was also in the 1980s and 1990s pop band The Cockroaches with fellow Wiggle Anthony Field.

He was the oldest member of the original Wiggles line up. Fatt was also known for falling asleep on stage, causing the other members (and later on the audience) to utter the iconic Wiggles catchphrase "Wake Up, Jeff!", which was also the title of one of their songs, as well as the title of one of their videos and albums.

== Early life and education ==
The third of four children, Fatt's Chinese parents Norma Wong Yee and Oscar Fatt owned a large retail store in Casino, New South Wales. His great-grandfather immigrated to Sydney, Australia in 1896, becoming a prosperous banana businessman. Fatt had aspirations to become an architect, and earned a Bachelor of Arts in industrial design. Anthony Field described him as a "bush kid" who "first learned to let his keyboard do most of the talking".

== The Cockroaches ==
He opened a public address equipment business with his brother in Sydney when he began playing keyboard for the rockabilly band the Roadmasters, and was recruited by Anthony and Paul Field to join the Cockroaches. Fatt joined the Cockroaches in 1981, serving as their keyboardist. In 1986 they signed with an independent label, Regular Records, which issued their first three albums, including The Cockroaches (March 1987), which peaked at No. 9 on the Australian Kent Music Report Albums Chart; it sold 70,000 copies and was certified platinum by their label. The album spawned the single "She's the One", which became the band's biggest hit when it peaked at No. 7 on the Kent Music Report Singles Chart in April 1987.

== The Wiggles ==
After The Cockroaches disbanded in the early 1990s, Anthony Field asked Fatt, who was renovating his house at the time, to help them record The Wiggles' first album in 1991. Fatt reported, "I got this call from Anthony: 'Hello, Anthony. Go away, go away. I'm not interested', you know. He's always got these ideas for things. He said, 'I've got this idea, come down to the studio'". Fatt's response to Field's request was, "Sure but how long will it take?" Field reported that as Fatt had done for the Cockroaches, he was "a musical backbone for the Wiggles". As a Wiggle, Fatt wore a purple skivvy.

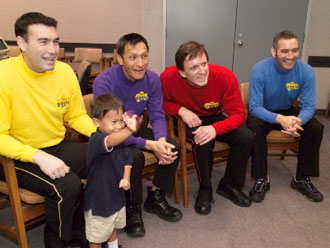
Fatt (second from left/purple shirt) with the rest of the original Wiggles, during a trip to NASA in 2004.

He originated the Wiggles character Henry the Octopus and has occasionally voiced Wags the Dog, and performed those voices when other actors took over the roles. Fatt reported that it took twelve months to "learn the language of preschool", including addressing children using the inclusive "everybody", instead of "boys and girls", and that the Wiggles' first performances were traumatic for him because he was not used to being around children.

=== Wake Up, Jeff! ===
Fatt's schtick was sleeping at odd times, which led to a Wiggles catchphrase and the title of one of their songs, "Wake Up, Jeff!" Fatt was the oldest Wiggle and was well known for his "laid-back personality", which according to Field, made him "invaluable company on the road". As Sam Moran has said, when referring to the development of the Wiggles' shticks, "Jeff really does fall asleep", and Fatt reported, "The irony is I'm a very light sleeper in the nighttime. I will invariably have a snooze before the show". Fatt was the only member of the Wiggles without a background in early childhood education; he stated that was the reason falling asleep was chosen as his schtick, "because it was a way of getting me involved in the shows without actually having to do anything". Field claimed Fatt's schtick endeared Fatt to their audiences and called it "a simple audience participation and interaction gag we've done since the start of the group".

Kathleen Warren, the group's former professor at Macquarie University and their consultant for their shows and DVDs, believed that the shtick empowered children, and Paul Field reported that children in the Wiggles' audience felt "great excitement" and were disappointed if not given the opportunity to help Jeff in this way.

Anthony Field reported that although in the early days of the group, they took turns falling asleep, it became Fatt's schtick because "it was a perfect fit".

=== Retirement ===
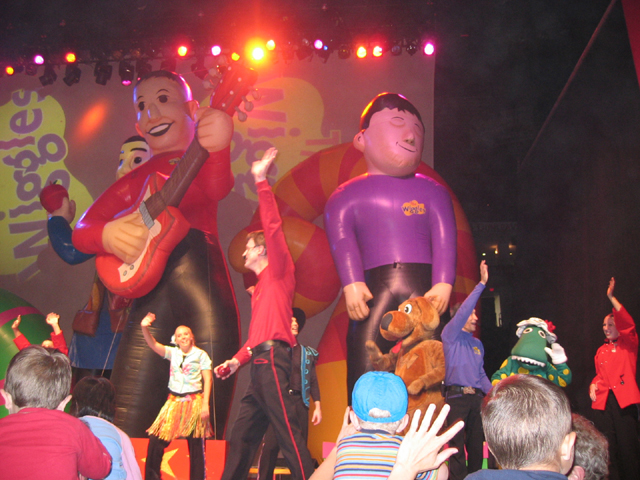
"Wiggly concert": Balloon versions of Jeff and Murray

On 17 May 2012, it was announced that Fatt along with Greg Page and Murray Cook, would be retiring at the end of the year. Wiggles cast member Lachlan Gillespie replaced him as the purple Wiggle. Fatt and the others are expected to remain involved with the creative and production aspects of the group. He continues to perform in reunion shows.

In July 2020, he appeared with the other classic Wiggles in The Soul Movers music video "Circles Baby". In September 2020, following the announcement of the birth of Gillespie's daughters, Lulu and Lottie, it was announced Gillespie would take some time away from the group in order to spend time with them. As a result, Fatt decided to temporarily replace Gillespie to film The Wiggly World Of Dance Classes, a four-part series. Fatt has made appearances in the newest Wiggles series, season 3 of Ready, Steady, Wiggle and has returned as the voice of Henry the Octopus.

== Personal life ==
Since 1990, Fatt has taken a photo a day documenting the most eventful thing that has happened to him. He stated in 2007 he was "a keen surfer".

=== Family ===
Fatt was featured on the fourth episode of the twelfth season of Who Do You Think You Are?, where it was revealed that his maternal grandfather, David Yong Yee, immigrated to Sydney, Australia in 1896, becoming a prosperous banana businessman. In 1909, David and his family moved to Hong Kong where they were involved in the creation of the Chen Kwong company, a successful Chinese-Australian retail store and one of the first of its kind. The company was liquidated in 1925 due largely to the Canton-Hong Kong strike, where they returned to Sydney, Australia in 1938. His paternal great-great-grandmother, Elizabeth Wright, was born in Middlesex, England and arrived in Melbourne, Australia in 1853 as a domestic servant. Elizabeth married Fatt's great-great-grandfather, Lee Young, a hay and corn storekeeper in Ballarat with origins from Canton, soon thereafter. Lee and Wright later moved to Ararat in 1863, where Lee became a Chinese interpreter for the city's colonial court until 1873. The couple later returned and retired in Ballarat, with Wright dying in 1892 and Young dying in 1899. Their second youngest child of six, and Fatt's paternal great-grandmother, Emma, married Chinese Methodist missionary Joseph Tear Tack in 1885 and moved to Tingha until 1896, where they then moved to Darwin and was affected by the 1897 Darwin cyclone, being among the residents who lost their home. They later moved to Cairns in 1900. Joseph died a year later in August 1901 and was survived by Emma and their four children, who returned to Ballarat, then Burwood, before eventually settling in Concord West. Emma later died on 28 October 1948.

=== Health ===
In early July 2011, Fatt underwent heart surgery after feeling unwell for several weeks and having a blackout. He was diagnosed as having a heart arrhythmia and was fitted with a pacemaker at Sydney's Mater Hospital. His surgery was "urgent but routine" and Fatt was expected to recover completely. He missed the summer US tour as a result, after never missing a show in 20 years.

== Awards ==
In what Paul Field called "one of the highlights of their 15 years of being together", Fatt, along with the original members of the Wiggles, was awarded an honorary doctorate degree from Australian Catholic University in 2006. All five members of the band were awarded another honorary doctoral degree in 2009 from Macquarie University. Fatt, along with the other three original Wiggles, was made a Member of the Order of Australia (AM) in January 2010 "for service to the arts, particularly children's entertainment, and to the community as a benefactor and supporter of a range of charities." Fatt also received an ARIA Hall of Fame Award with the Wiggles in 2011.

== Filmography ==
=== Television ===
Year	Television	Role	Notes	Ref
1998–present	The Wiggles	Jeff Wiggle / Henry the Octopus		

=== Film ===
Year	Film	Role	Notes	Ref
1997	The Wiggles Movie	Jeff Wiggle / Henry the Octopus (voice)		

== Discography ==
=== With The Cockroaches ===
==== Studio albums ====
Title	Year
The Cockroaches	1987
Fingertips	1988
Positive	1991
St. Patrick's Day 10am	1994

==== Singles ====
Title	Year
"I Want a Leather Jacket" / "Blue Moon of Kentucky"	1980
"Through with Her" / "Bingo Bango"	1981
"Used to Be"	1981
"Empty Heart"	1981
"Shake Jump and Shout"	1982
"See You in Spain"	1984
"My Whole World's Fallin' Down"	1985
"Another Night Alone"	1985
"Wait Up"	1986
"She's the One"	1987
"Some Kind of Girl"	1987
"Double Shot (Of My Baby's Love)"	1987
"Hey What Now!"	1988
"You and Me"	1988
"Permanently Single"	1989
"Another Saturday Night"	1989
"Hope"	1990
"Here Comes That Feeling"	1990
"I Must Have Been Blind"	1991

== Bibliography ==
- Field, Anthony; Truman, Greg (2012). How I Got My Wiggle Back: A Memoir of Healing. Hoboken, New Jersey: John Wiley & Sons. ISBN 978-1-118-01933-7.
