= Paul Paddick =

Australian singer and actor

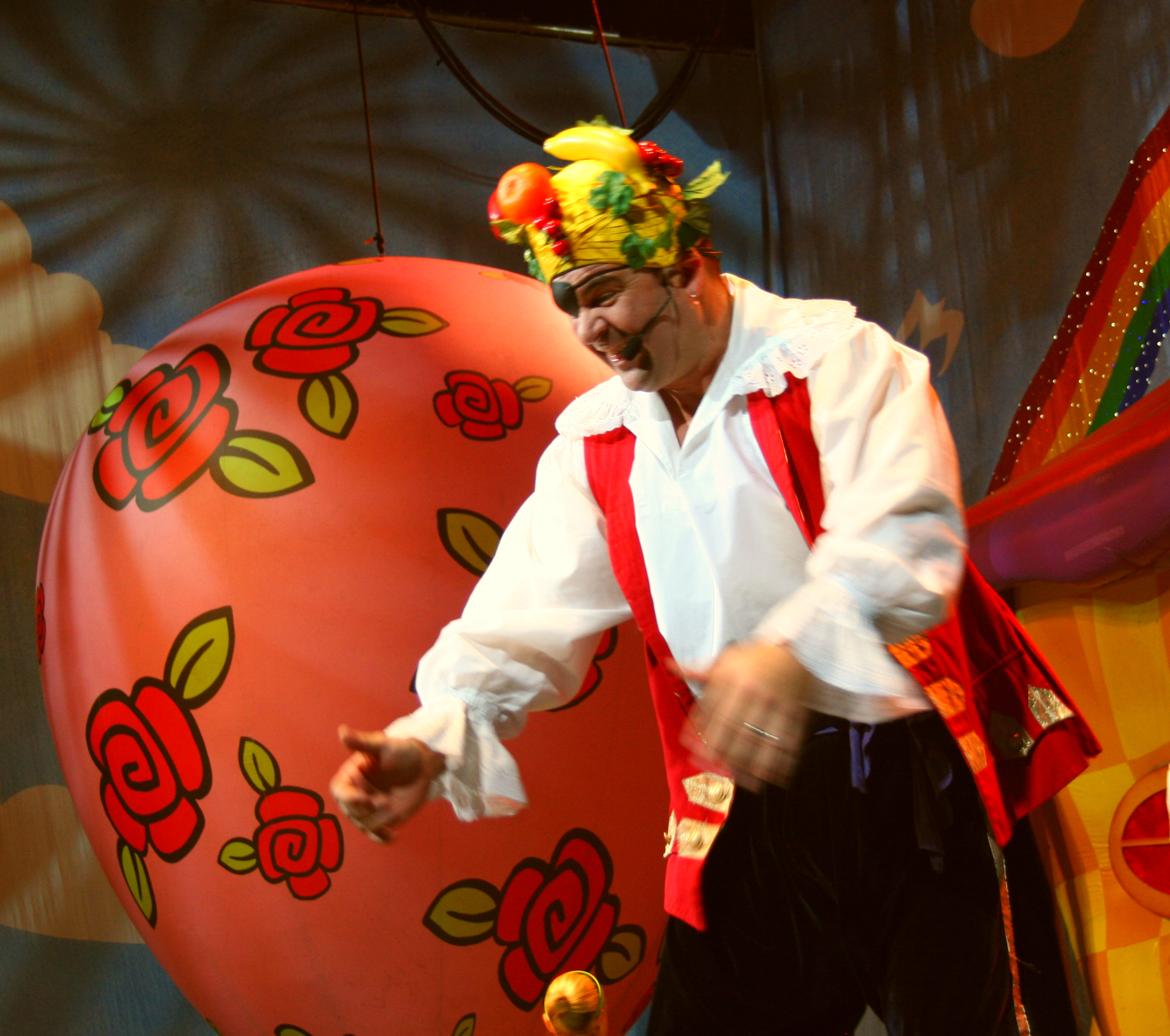
- Paul Paddick as Captain Feathersword of The Wiggles, 2007

Background information
- Also known as: Paddy
- Born: Paul Andrew Paddick; Adelaide, South Australia
- Genre: Children's music
- Occupations: Singer, actor, dancer
- Instruments: Vocals, bass
- Years active: 1992–present
- Formerly of: The Wiggles
- Spouse: Charmaine Martin (m. 2004)

Paul Andrew Paddick is an Australian singer and actor. He is best known for his portrayal of Captain Feathersword, "the friendly pirate", a character associated with the children's band the Wiggles, where he eventually came to be known as "the fifth Wiggle".

== Early life and education ==
Paddick earned a Bachelor of Music from the University of Adelaide, studying classical opera for three years.

He also studied drama at the Western Australian Academy of Performing Arts (WAAPA), at the same time as Hugh Jackman. He has stated that even during his training as a performer, he "much preferred to be the comic second than the actual lead because it was much more fun and a lot less pressure. You got to get all the laughs and subtly steal part of the show".

Paddick joined the Victoria State Opera's touring group of West Side Story where he played Diesel from 1992–94. He also played the Robber King in Don Quixote.

== The Wiggles ==
Paddick met Anthony Field, a founding member of the Wiggles, in 1993. By that time, Paddick had appeared in over fifteen major productions, including Victorian State Opera's Don Quixote and a two-year tour of West Side Story. Field needed a hernia operation, so he asked Paddick to temporarily take over for him; for that tour, he not only stepped in for Field as the Blue Wiggle, Wags the Dog, and Captain Feathersword, he also played Dorothy the Dinosaur, who was performed by Murray Cook, the Red Wiggle. A job that was supposed to end in five weeks resulted in Paddick touring and appearing with the Wiggles full-time since late 1995. He also appears in all of their Australian-produced television programs. Paddick has become so closely associated with the band that he is sometimes referred to as the "Fifth Wiggle," a name also given to Phillip Wilcher. He also voices Henry the Octopus in tandem with Jeff Fatt, the original purple Wiggle.

Paddick serves as "the adult relief" in The Wiggles' concerts; his vocal impersonations of singers such as Mick Jagger, Cher, Plácido Domingo, and James Hetfield, have been called "the high point of The Wiggles stage show". Field states that Paddick is "as funny offstage as on".

== Personal life ==
Paddick married dancer Charmaine Martin in 2004. Martin was a part of the Wiggles touring company; she played Pirate Charlie, Henry the Octopus, Wags the Dog, and Dorothy the Dinosaur. They have two children. Paddick's nickname is "Paddy".

== Filmography ==
=== Television ===
Year	Television	Role	Notes	Ref
1998–present	The Wiggles	Captain Feathersword		

=== Film ===
Year	Television	Role	Notes	Ref
1997	The Wiggles Movie	Captain Feathersword / Rose Robber / Life Saver		
