= Paul Field (musician) =

Paul Field AM
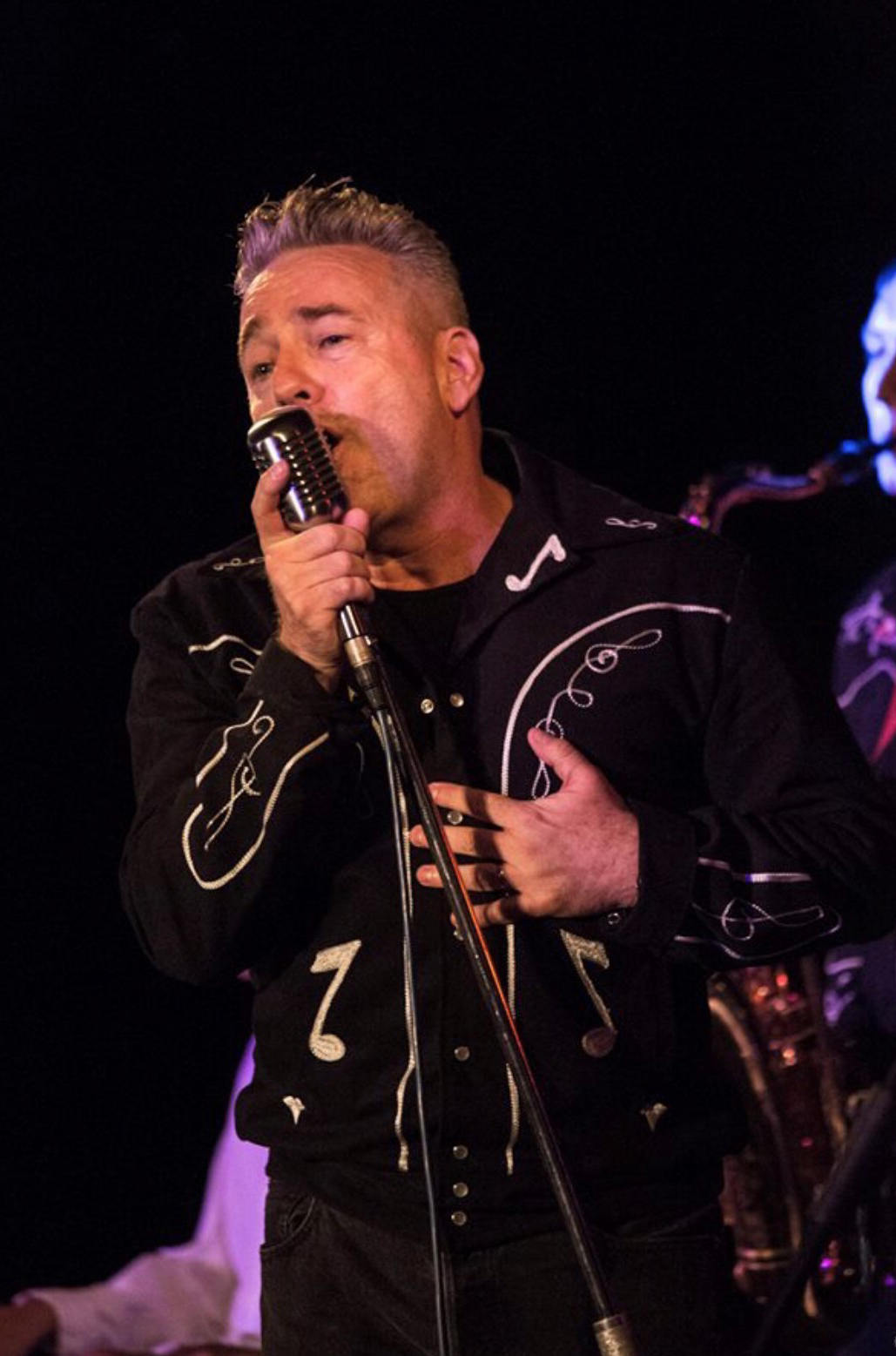
- Paul Field performing live onstage in 2019.

Background information
- Born: Paul James Field; 3 May 1961 (age 65)
- Origin: Sydney, Australia
- Genres: Pop rock, children's music, pub rock, Country rock
- Occupations: Producer; director; musician; songwriter; author; talent manager
- Instruments: Vocals, guitar
- Label: ABC Music
- Member of: the Field Brothers
- Formerly of: the Cockroaches
- Spouse: Pauline Field (m. 1984)

Paul James Field AM (born 3 May 1961) is an Australian musician, filmmaker and author. He is best known as one of the founding members of the Sydney pub rock band the Cockroaches and the Field Brothers and as Managing Director for the children's music group the Wiggles.

== Early life and education ==
Field was educated at St Joseph's College Hunters Hill, where he excelled as a rugby player and musician. Upon leaving school he attained his teaching qualification from Australian Catholic University and a diploma of religious education from Aquinas Academy in Sydney.

In the late 1970s, while still at boarding school he and his brothers John and Anthony formed the pop group The Cockroaches. Paul was the lead vocalist for the band and also booked their first live shows in pubs in the inner city of Sydney and Kings Cross.

== Career ==
=== 1979–1994: The Cockroaches ===
The Cockroaches enjoyed some success in Australia, producing three albums, one of which, The Cockroaches, sold 100,000 copies and became platinum. The band consisted of the three Field brothers, who played guitar and vocals, fellow boarding-school student Tony Henry, who played drums, Phil Robinson on bass, and Jeff Fatt on keyboards. According to Anthony Field, Paul Field was "a picture of professional efficiency", whereas John Field was the showman of the group. John Field's performances on-stage built the Cockroaches' reputation for being a party-band, even though alcohol and drug use was never part of the band's culture. In the heyday of The Cockroaches, they played over 300 gigs a year all over Australia; according to Anthony Field, they were "one of the biggest crowd-drawing groups in Australia". Australian musicologist Ian McFarland called The Cockroaches "an in-demand pub band [that built] a sweaty, frenzied atmosphere with good old-fashioned showmanship and unpretentious, energetic rock'n'pop".

In 1988, The Daily Telegraph surveyed booking agencies and described the band as the "Hardest Working Rock 'n' Roll Band in the Country".

In September 1988, while The Cockroaches were on tour in Queensland, Field's eight-month-old daughter died of SIDS. Her death "had a devastating effect on everyone involved", but The Cockroaches went back on tour to "create a sense of normality" and because he "had bills to pay". By early 1989, however, "nothing was ever the same again"; Anthony Field left the band to study Early Childhood Education at Macquarie University, and The Cockroaches disbanded. Anthony formed The Wiggles in 1991, with Murray Cook, Greg Page, and fellow Cockroaches band member Jeff Fatt, and they dedicated their first album to his niece.

=== 1996–2020: The Wiggles ===
In 1996, at the request of his brother Anthony, Field became the Wiggles' manager and began working with them. At first, he booked venues for the group, "mainly pre-schools, RSLs and theatres". By 2007, he produced and directed their videos and oversaw their consumer products. As manager of the Wiggles, Anthony Field has said, "I totally trust Paul; he is an honest man".

Field has expressed an appreciation for the development of the Wiggles coming out of the tragedy of his daughter's death. He has performed a song with the Wiggles called "Sleep Safe My Baby"."When I think of how much joy [The] Wiggles have brought to children, it's good to know that out of an event so horrifying, something good has come", Field has said. Field has his daughter's name tattooed on his right arm and the names of his four other children and his wife on his left arm, something his younger brother Anthony has emulated when he had the names of his three children tattooed on his arms. Paul Field's children have appeared in several of the Wiggles' videos and television programs. His son Luke Field served as tour manager and his daughter Clare Field was dance captain for The Wiggles' "Dorothy the Dinosaur Show"; both had toured with the group for most of their lives. In 2020, Field retired from his role with The Wiggles to pursue other opportunities.

=== 2011–2020: The Field Brothers ===
In 2011, twenty years after the last recording of The Cockroaches, Field and his brother John recorded an album, entitled 1964 because its cover featured a picture of the brothers taken that year. Their sister Maria co-wrote a track on the album, and some Cockroaches songs were re-recorded as country songs, including their hits "Some Kind of Girl", "Rely on Me", and "Permanently Single". The album was dedicated to the Fields' parents and to Paul's oldest daughter, and reflected the previous 20 years of their lives.

2016 saw the release of The Field Brothers' second album Every Day Is Like an Elvis Movie, which featured cameos from guests including Greedy Smith (Mental As Anything).

=== 2021: Solo career ===
In February 2021, Field announced he would release his first solo album, Love Songs for Lonely People, in June 2021. The album was preceded by the singles "Valentines Day", a duet with Australian country singer Kasey Chambers, a cover of Bob Dylan's "You Ain't Goin' Nowhere", with Jimmy Barnes and "This Way to Love and Happiness".

Love Songs for Lonely People was released on 4 June 2021.

== Discography ==
=== Albums ===
| Title | Details |
|---|---|
| Love Songs for Lonely People | Released: 4 June 2021; Label: Paul Fields, ABC Music |

=== Singles ===
| Title | Year | Album |
|---|---|---|
| "Valentines Day" (featuring Kasey Chambers) | 2021 | Love Songs for Lonely People |
| "You Ain't Goin' Nowhere" (with Jimmy Barnes) | 2021 | Love Songs for Lonely People |
| "This Way to Love and Happiness" | 2021 | Love Songs for Lonely People |

== Awards ==
Field was made a Member of the Order of Australia in the 2020 Australia Day Honours for "significant service to the arts, particularly to children's entertainment, and as a supporter of charitable endeavours."
