= John Field (songwriter) =

Australian composer and songwriter

- Born: John William Michael Field; 15 May 1962 (age 64); Darlinghurst, New South Wales, Australia
- Genres: Rock, R&B, pop, country
- Occupation: Musician
- Instruments: Vocals, guitar
- Years active: 1979–present
- Formerly of: the Cockroaches, the John Field band, the Field Brothers
- Spouse: Jacqueline Fallon
- Website: johnfieldband.com

John William Michael Field (born 15 May 1962) is an Australian composer and songwriter. He was a founding mainstay member of the Sydney pub rock band the Cockroaches on rhythm guitar and sharing lead vocals. He has written tracks for the children's music group, the Wiggles, including "Hot Potato". His brothers, Paul Field (later the Wiggles managing director) and Anthony Field (the blue Wiggle), were also bandmates in the Cockroaches.

== Early life and education ==
John William Michael Field was born on 15 May 1962 in Darlinghurst and grew up in north-western Sydney as one of seven children. Their father, John Patrick Field (1932–98), was a suburban chemist. Their mother, Marie, made sure that they all learned how to play at least one musical instrument. Field attended an all-boys boarding school, St. Joseph's College, alongside his older brother, Paul, and younger brother, Anthony. Field was selected as the Under-19 New South Wales Cricketer of the Year. Anthony has declared that John would have been a professional cricketer if it were not for his success in music.

== Career ==
=== The Cockroaches and other music projects ===
In 1979 John Field, on rhythm guitar and co-lead vocals, formed an Australian rock, R&B and pop music band, the Cockroaches, alongside Paul on co-lead vocals, Anthony on co-lead vocals and guitar, Jeff Fatt on keyboards, Tony Henry on drums and Phil Robinson on bass guitar. As a member of the Cockroaches, Field was recorded on their four studio albums, The Cockroaches (1987), Fingertips (1988), Positive (1991) and St. Patrick's Day 10am (1994), before they disbanded in 1994.

Early in 1991 Anthony and Fatt had left the Cockroaches to form the Wiggles, a children's music group, with Murray Cook, Greg Page and Phillip Wilcher. Field helped write much of their music.

In 1992 Field was a member of the Honeymen, alongside Sean Sennett. The duo released two singles, "Felt Like a Kiss" and "Motorbike of Love". Field has been in other live bands including The Alligators and The Oomph. His own group, the John Field Band, performs at parties and corporate functions. The John Field Band released two albums, a self-titled debut and Night Will Fall (December 2007).

Field wrote, composed and directed a musical theatre production, Evie and the Birdman (July 2001), which originally starred Sam Moran. Field created another musical, Who Loves Me?.

Field has also written commercial jingles, including one for Parklea Markets. In 2011 Field and Paul formed the Field Brothers, they issued a country music album, 1964. In 2014 Field issued a solo album, Bubba, mumma needs sleep: soothing music for babies and parents.

== Personal life ==
John Field is married to Jacqueline Fallon, who choreographed Evie and the Birdman. The couple have four children. Field has a degree in education and, with his family, resides in Sydney. In May 2008, Field was diagnosed with Dupuytren's contracture and sought treatment.
