= The Wiggles discography =

Discography for The Wiggles

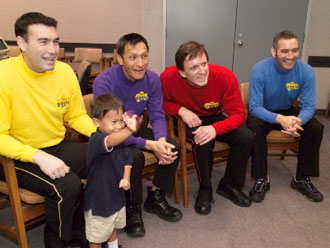
- Four of the original Wiggles and a fan in 2004. (L–R: Greg Page, Jeff Fatt, Murray Cook, and Anthony Field)
- Studio albums: 62
- Extended plays: 3
- Live albums: 3
- Compilation albums: 11
- Tribute albums: 2
- Singles: 38
- Audiobooks: 2
- Karaoke albums: 4
- Digital albums: 14
- Spinoff albums: 14
- Remix albums: 1

Australian children's musical group the Wiggles have released sixty-two studio albums, three live albums, eleven compilation albums, three extended plays, thirty-eight singles, two audiobooks, four karaoke albums, fourteen digital albums, two tribute albums, one remix album and fourteen spinoff albums featuring solo group members or characters. Eighteen of the group's albums have been certified by the Australian Recording Industry Association (ARIA) as Gold, Platinum and double Platinum. Three of their albums have reached the top 10 on the ARIA Albums Chart.

The Wiggles (1991) was the original line-up's earliest album to be certified by ARIA, achieving Platinum status in 1995. Yummy Yummy (1994) achieved double Platinum status, certified in 2008. The album was also certified Gold in the US in 2004. Their next three releases, Big Red Car (1995), Wake Up Jeff! (1996) and Wiggly, Wiggly Christmas (1996) had also all received double Platinum certifications by 2008. Their eighth studio album, The Wiggles Movie Soundtrack (1997), which doubled as the soundtrack for the group's self-titled feature film, was the first to enter the ARIA Albums Chart, peaking at number 36 in November 1997. It was certified Platinum in 2008 along with Toot Toot! (1998). An additional eight of the original quartet's albums attained Gold status.

The Wiggles returned to the charts with their new line-up, when Apples & Bananas (2014) charted at number 60. The group's fiftieth album, Nursery Rhymes 2 (2018), peaked at number 3, becoming their highest-charting release while in its debut week, and the group's first top 10 album; the compilation album We're All Fruit Salad! The Wiggles' Greatest Hits (2021) also peaked at number 3. The Best of the Wiggles (2016) was the new line-up's first album to be certified, reaching Platinum in 2018, while Nursery Rhymes (2017) was accredited Gold in 2020. The group's cover of Tame Impala's "Elephant", which they performed on Triple J's Like a Version segment, became their first top 10 single, peaking at number 10 in January 2022 after it reached No. 1 on the annual Triple J Hottest 100 poll for 2021; it was certified as Gold in 2024. The group's 2022 tribute album ReWiggled debuted at number one on the ARIA Albums Chart, becoming their first number-one album in Australia. Wiggle and Learn: 100 Educational Songs for Children, the group's 100th album, was released in August 2024.

== Albums ==
=== Studio albums ===
List of studio albums, with selected chart positions and certifications
Title	Album details	Peak chart position		Certifications
Title	Album details	AUS	US	Certifications
The Wiggles	Released: 1991; Label: ABC / EMI; Format: CD, cassette	—	—	ARIA: Platinum
Here Comes a Song	Released: 1992; Label: ABC / EMI; Format: CD, cassette	—	—	ARIA: Platinum
Stories and Songs: The Adventures of Captain Feathersword the Friendly Pirate	Released: 1993; Label: ABC / EMI; Format: CD, cassette	—	—	
Yummy Yummy	Released: 1994; Label: ABC / EMI; Format: CD, cassette, vinyl (Note: A limited edition vinyl record was released through Impressed Recordings in 2023. It was limited to 500 copies, 125 for each colour worn by the Wiggles.)	—	— (Note: Over 2003 and 2004, Yummy Yummy did not enter the Billboard 200, but reached number 17 on the Independent Albums chart, number 21 on the Heatseekers Albums chart, and number 4 on the Kid Albums chart.)	ARIA: 2× Platinum; RIAA: Gold
Big Red Car	Released: 1995; Label: ABC / EMI; Format: CD, cassette	—	—	ARIA: 2× Platinum
Wake Up Jeff!	Released: 1996; Label: ABC / EMI; Format: CD, cassette	—	—	ARIA: 2× Platinum
Wiggly, Wiggly Christmas	Released: 1996; Label: ABC / EMI; Format: CD, cassette	—	—	ARIA: 2× Platinum
The Wiggles Movie Soundtrack	Released: 1997; Label: ABC / EMI; Format: CD, cassette	36	—	ARIA: Platinum
Toot Toot!	Released: 1998; Label: ABC / EMI; Format: CD, cassette	—	—	ARIA: Platinum
It's a Wiggly Wiggly World	Released: 2000; Label: ABC / EMI; Format: CD, cassette	39	—	ARIA: Gold
Wiggle Time!	Released: 2000; Label: ABC / EMI; Format: CD, cassette	—	—	ARIA: Gold
Yule Be Wiggling	Released: 2000; Label: ABC / EMI; Format: CD, cassette	55	—	ARIA: Gold
Hoop Dee Doo: It's a Wiggly Party	Released: 2001; Label: ABC / EMI; Format: CD	100	—	ARIA: Gold
Wiggly Safari	Released: 2002; Label: ABC / Roadshow; Format: CD, cassette	96	—	ARIA: Gold
Wiggle Bay	Released: 30 September 2002; Label: ABC / Roadshow; Format: CD / cassette	—	—	
Go to Sleep Jeff!	Released: 7 April 2003; Label: ABC / Roadshow; Format: CD, cassette	—	—	
Whoo Hoo! Wiggly Gremlins!	Released: 2003; Label: ABC / Roadshow; Format: CD, cassette	95	—	
Top of the Tots	Released: 25 September 2003; Label: ABC / Roadshow; Format: CD, cassette	—	—	ARIA: Gold
Cold Spaghetti Western	Released: 6 July 2004; Label: ABC / Roadshow; Format: CD, cassette	—	—	
Santa's Rockin'!	Released: 7 October 2004; Label: ABC / Roadshow; Format: CD, cassette	—	—	
Sailing Around the World	Released: 8 August 2005; Label: ABC / Roadshow; Format: CD, cassette	—	—	
Here Comes the Big Red Car	Released: 2 February 2006; Label: ABC / Roadshow; Format: CD, cassette	—	—	
It's Time to Wake Up Jeff!	Released: 4 May 2006; Label: ABC / Roadshow; Format: CD	—	—	
Splish Splash Big Red Boat	Released: 27 June 2006; Label: Koch (USA) (Note: This album was not released in Australia.); Format: CD	—	—	
Racing to the Rainbow	Released: 28 August 2006; Label: ABC / Roadshow; Format: CD	—	—	
Getting Strong!	Released: 16 May 2007; Label: ABC / Roadshow; Format: CD	—	—	
Pop Go the Wiggles!	Released: 1 August 2007; Label: ABC / Roadshow; Format: CD	—	—	
You Make Me Feel Like Dancing	Released: 8 May 2008; Label: ABC / Roadshow; Format: CD	—	—	
Sing a Song of Wiggles	Released: 7 August 2008; Label: ABC / Roadshow; Format: CD	—	—	
Go Bananas!	Released: 5 February 2009; Label: ABC / Roadshow; Format: CD	—	—	
Hot Poppin' Popcorn	Released: 2009; Label: ABC / Roadshow; Format: CD	—	—	
Let's Eat	Released: 1 July 2010; Label: ABC / Roadshow; Format: CD	—	—	
Ukulele Baby!	Released: 3 February 2011; Label: ABC / Roadshow; Format: CD, digital download	—	—	
It's Always Christmas with You!	Released: 6 October 2011; Label: ABC / Roadshow; Format: CD, digital download	— (Note: It's Always Christmas with You did not enter the Top 100, but peaked at number 6 on the Hitseekers Albums Chart.)	—	
Surfer Jeff	Released: 3 May 2012; Label: ABC / Roadshow; Format: CD, digital download	—	—	
Taking Off!	Released: 1 February 2013; Label: ABC / Universal; Format: CD, digital download	— (Note: Taking Off! did not enter the Top 100, but peaked at number 7 on the Hitseekers Albums Chart, and in 2014, peaked at number 80 on the Physical Albums Chart.)	—	
Furry Tales	Released: 3 May 2013; Label: ABC / Universal; Format: CD, digital download	—	—	
Pumpkin Face (Note: This album was released as Wiggly Halloween in the US.)	Released: 2 August 2013; Label: ABC / Universal; Format: CD, digital download	—	—	
Go Santa Go!	Released: 3 October 2013; Label: ABC / Universal; Format: CD, digital download	— (Note: Go Santa Go! did not enter the Top 100, but peaked at number 1 on the Hitseekers Albums Chart, and number 80 on the Physical Albums Chart.)	—	
Apples & Bananas	Released: 7 February 2014; Label: ABC / Universal; Format: CD, digital download	60	—	
Wiggle House	Released: 2 May 2014; Label: ABC / Universal; Format: CD, digital download	86	—	
Rock & Roll Preschool	Released: 6 February 2015; Label: ABC / Universal; Format: CD, digital download	43	—	
Meet the Orchestra!	Released: 5 June 2015; Label: ABC / Universal; Format: CD, digital download	52	—	
Wiggle Town!	Released: 5 February 2016; Label: ABC / Universal; Format: CD, digital download	41	—	
Carnival of the Animals	Released: 1 July 2016; Label: ABC / Universal; Format: CD, digital download	— (Note: Carnival of the Animals did not enter the Top 100, but peaked at number 86 on the Physical Albums Chart.)	—	
Dance Dance!	Released: 2 September 2016; Label: ABC / Universal; Format: CD, digital download	59	—	
Nursery Rhymes	Released: 17 February 2017; Label: ABC / Universal; Format: CD, digital download	15	—	ARIA: Gold
Duets	Released: 26 May 2017; Label: ABC / Universal; Format: CD, digital download	—	—	
Wiggly, Wiggly Christmas!	Released: 27 October 2017; Label: ABC / Universal; Format: CD, digital download	29	—	
Nursery Rhymes 2	Released: 2 March 2018; Label: ABC / Universal; Format: CD, digital download	3	—	
Wiggle Pop!	Released: 31 August 2018; Label: ABC / Universal; Format: CD, digital download	24	—	
Big Ballet Day!	Released: 22 February 2019; Label: ABC / Universal; Format: CD, digital download	— (Note: Big Ballet Day! did not enter the Top 100, but peaked at number 43 on the Physical Albums Chart, and number 42 on the Digital Albums Chart.)	—	
Party Time!	Released: 21 June 2019; Label: ABC / Universal; Format: CD, digital download	30	—	
Fun and Games	Released: 27 March 2020; Label: ABC / Universal; Format: CD, digital download	44	—	
Choo Choo Trains, Propeller Planes & Toot Toot Chugga Chugga Big Red Car!	Released: 26 June 2020; Label: ABC / Universal; Format: CD, digital download	83	—	
Lullabies with Love	Released: 4 June 2021; Label: ABC / Universal; Format: CD, digital download	—	—	
Halloween Party	Released: 8 October 2021; Label: ABC / Universal; Format: CD, digital download	—	—	
Super Wiggles	Released: 1 April 2022; Label: ABC / Universal; Format: CD, digital download	—	—	
Ready, Steady, Wiggle!	Released: 14 April 2023; Label: ABC / Universal; Format: CD, digital download	44	—	ARIA: Silver
The Sound of Halloween	Released: 29 September 2023; Label: ABC / Universal; Format: Digital download	—	—	
The Sound of Christmas	Released: 1 December 2023; Label: ABC / Universal; Format: CD, digital download	—	—	
Wiggle and Learn: 100 Educational Songs for Children	Released: 16 August 2024; Label: ABC / Universal; Format: 2×CD, digital download	—	—	
Wiggle Up, Giddy Up!	Released: 7 March 2025; Label: ABC; Format: CD, digital download	40	—	
"—" denotes items which were not released in that country or failed to chart.

=== Live albums ===
List of live albums, with selected chart positions and certifications
Title	Album details	Peak chart position	Certifications
Title	Album details	AUS	Certifications
Live: Hot Potatoes	Released: 2005; Label: ABC / Roadshow; Format: CD, cassette	—	ARIA: Gold
Big Birthday!	Released: 2 June 2011; Label: ABC / Roadshow; Format: CD, digital download	—	
Celebration!	Released: 17 August 2012; Label: ABC / Universal; Format: CD, digital download	— (Note: Celebration did not enter the Top 100, but peaked at number 5 on the Hitseekers Albums Chart.)	
"—" denotes items which failed to chart.

=== Compilation albums ===
List of compilation albums, with selected chart positions and certifications
Title	Album details	Peak chart position		Certifications
Title	Album details	AUS	NZL	Certifications
Christmas Classics	Released: 2006; Label: ABC / Roadshow; Format: CD	—	—	
Hot Potatoes! The Best of the Wiggles (2009 edition)	Released: 7 May 2009; Label: ABC / Roadshow; Format: CD	67	—	ARIA: Platinum
Hit Songs and Rarities	Released: 19 October 2012; Label: ABC / Universal; Format: CD, digital download	— (Note: Hit Songs and Rarities did not enter the Top 100, but peaked at number 8 on the Hitseekers Albums Chart.)	—	
Christmas Crackers!	Released: 9 November 2012; Label: ABC / Universal; Format: CD, digital download	— (Note: Christmas Crackers did not enter the Top 100, but peaked at number 6 on the Hitseekers Albums Chart.)	—	
Hot Potatoes! The Best of the Wiggles (2013 edition)	Released: 2013; Label: ABC / Universal; Format: CD, digital download	32	—	
Hot Potatoes & Cold Spaghetti	Released: 23 October 2015; Label: ABC / Universal; Format: CD	—	—	
The Best of the Wiggles on Vinyl	Released: 2016; Label: ABC / Universal; Format: Vinyl	—	—	
The Best of the Wiggles (2016 edition)	Released: 27 May 2016; Label: ABC / Universal; Format: CD, digital download	16	38	ARIA: Platinum
We're All Fruit Salad! The Wiggles' Greatest Hits	Released: 5 March 2021; Label: ABC / Universal; Format: CD, digital download	3	—	
The Best of the Wiggles (2023 edition)	Released: 27 October 2023; Label: ABC / Universal; Format: 2×CD, digital download	—	—	
Hot Potato! The Best of the OG Wiggles	Released: 27 October 2023; Label: ABC / Universal; Format: CD, vinyl, digital download	40	—	ARIA: Silver
"—" denotes items which were not released in that country or failed to chart.

=== Audiobooks ===
List of audiobooks
Title	Album details
CinderEmma! Fairytale	Released: 1 April 2016; Label: ABC / Universal; Format: CD, digital download
Stories with the Wiggles	Released: 1 November 2020; Label: ABC / Universal; Format: CD, digital download

=== Karaoke albums ===
List of karaoke albums
Title	Album details
Karaoke Songs 1	Released: 2005; Label: ABC / Roadshow; Format: CD
Karaoke Christmas Songs	Released: 2005; Label: ABC / Roadshow; Format: CD
Karaoke Songs 2	Released: 2006; Label: ABC / Roadshow; Format: CD
Karaoke Songs 3	Released: 2006; Label: ABC / Roadshow; Format: CD

=== Digital albums ===
List of digital albums
Title	Album details
Live From Hot Potato Studios: Let There Be Rock-a-Bye Your Bear	Released: 5 May 2020; Label: ABC / The Orchard; Format: Digital download
Live From Hot Potato Studios: Wash Your Hands	Released: 19 May 2020; Label: ABC / The Orchard; Format: Digital download
Live From Hot Potato Studios: How Are You Today Friend?	Released: 2 June 2020; Label: ABC / The Orchard; Format: Digital download
Live From Hot Potato Studios: Tiny Play Time	Released: 16 June 2020; Label: ABC / The Orchard; Format: Digital download
Live From Hot Potato Studios: It's a Galloping Day!	Released: 30 June 2020; Label: ABC / The Orchard; Format: Digital download
Live From Hot Potato Studios: Come & See The Animals!	Released: 14 July 2020; Label: ABC / The Orchard; Format: Digital download
Emma's Bowtiful Ballet Studio	Released: 28 July 2020; Label: ABC / The Orchard; Format: Digital download
Le James Café	Released: 2 October 2020; Label: ABC / The Orchard; Format: Digital download
Sweet Dreams: White Noise Sleep Aid for Baby	Released: 23 July 2021; Label: ABC / The Orchard; Format: Digital download
Sweet Dreams: Calm Quiet Soothing Sounds For Relaxing Baby	Released: 23 July 2021; Label: ABC / The Orchard; Format: Digital download
Fruit Salad TV	Released: 15 October 2021; Label: ABC / The Orchard; Format: Digital download
Fruit Salad TV Christmas	Released: 10 December 2021; Label: ABC / The Orchard; Format: Digital download
Wiggly Nursery Rhymes	Released: 17 June 2022; Label: ABC / The Orchard; Format: Digital download
Learning Greek With Lucia!	Released: 23 May 2025; Label: ABC / The Orchard; Format: Digital download
Hello, We're the Wiggles	Released: 13 March 2026; Label: Universal; Format: Digital download

=== Spinoff albums ===
List of other albums, with selected chart positions
Title	Album details	Peak chart position
Title	Album details	AUS
Dorothy the Dinosaur	Released: 4 April 2007; Label: ABC / Roadshow; Format: CD	—
Dorothy the Dinosaur's Memory Book	Released: 13 February 2008; Label: ABC / Roadshow; Format: CD	—
The Kingdom of Paramithi	Released: 12 May 2009; Label: ABC / Roadshow; Format: CD	—
Dorothy the Dinosaur Meets Santa Claus	Released: 2009; Label: ABC / Roadshow; Format: CD	—
Dorothy the Dinosaur's Rockin' Christmas	Released: 7 October 2010; Label: ABC / Roadshow; Format: CD	—
Dorothy the Dinosaur's Travelling Show!	Released: 2011; Label: ABC / Roadshow; Format: CD, digital download	—
Dorothy the Dinosaur's Beach Party!	Released: 2 November 2012; Label: ABC / Roadshow; Format: CD	—
Emma!	Released: 24 April 2015; Label: ABC / Universal; Format: CD, digital download	56
Dial E for Emma!	Released: 7 October 2016; Label: ABC / Universal; Format: CD, digital download	— (Note: Dial E for Emma! did not enter the Top 100, but peaked at number 8 on the Hitseekers Albums Chart.)
Lachy!	Released: 7 October 2016; Label: ABC / Universal; Format: CD, digital download	— (Note: Lachy! did not enter the Top 100, but peaked at number 14 on the Hitseekers Albums Chart.)
Och Aye the G'nu (with Jimmy Barnes)	Released: 31 March 2017; Label: ABC / Universal; Format: CD, digital download	34
The Emma & Lachy Show!	Released: 1 June 2018; Label: ABC / Universal; Format: CD, digital download	—
Emma! 2	Released: 27 September 2019; Label: ABC / Universal; Format: CD, digital download	—
The Tree of Wisdom (with the Tree of Wisdom)	Released: 3 October 2025; Label: The Wiggles, ABC (CD, LP) / The Orchard, ABC (digital download); Format: CD, LP, digital download	27
"—" denotes items which were not released in that country or failed to chart.

=== Tribute albums ===
List of other albums, with selected chart positions
Title	Album details	Peak chart position
Title	Album details	AUS
ReWiggled – A Tribute to the Wiggles	Released: November 2011; Label: ABC Music (2787027); Format: CD	25
ReWiggled	Released: 11 March 2022; Label: ABC / Universal; Format: 2×CD, vinyl, digital download	1

=== Remix albums ===
List of remix albums
Title	Album details	Peak chart position
Title	Album details	AUS
The Wiggles Sound System: Rave of Innocence	Released: 19 April 2024; Label: ABC; Format: Vinyl, digital download	87

== Extended plays ==
List of extended plays
Title	EP details
iTunes Live	Released: 1 March 2011; Label: ABC; Format: Digital download
Wiggly Babershop	Released: 22 May 2020 Label: ABC Format: Digital download
Apple Music Home Session: The Wiggles	Released: 15 July 2022; Label: ABC; Format: Digital download

== Singles ==
†	Denotes the single was released physically on CD

List of singles, with year released, selected chart positions, and album name shown
Title	Year	Peak chart positions	Certifications	Album
Title	Year	AUS	Certifications	Album
"Eagle Rock" (featuring Ross Wilson)	2003	80		Wiggle Bay
"Christmas Single"	2004	81		Santa's Rockin'!
"Beep! Beep! Buckle Up!"	2012	—		Non-album singles
"Power Through the Day"	2013	—		Non-album singles
"Rise for Alex"	2014	—		Non-album singles
"NSW Blues Song!"	2017	—		Non-album singles
"The Toilet Song"	2019	—		Big Ballet Day!
"The Alphabet Ballet"	2019	—		Big Ballet Day!
"My Ballet Goat"	2019	—		Big Ballet Day!
"I Am a Fine Musician"	2019	—		Party Time!
"The Ants Go Marching"	2019	—		Party Time!
"What's the Time, Mr. Wolf?"	2019	—		Party Time!
"Drum Chronology" (featuring Kye Smith)	2019	—		Non-album singles
"Big4 Wiggly Song"	2019	—		Non-album singles
"Singing Like a Rock Singer" (featuring Jack Gatto)	2019	—		Non-album singles
"Handwashing Song"	2019	—		Choo Choo Trains, Propeller Planes & Toot Toot Chugga Chugga Big Red Car!
"Anthony Ant" (featuring Jack Gatto)	2019	—		Non-album singles
"Do the Propeller!" (featuring Sesame Street)	2019	—		Non-album singles
"Here Come the Wiggles"	2020	—		Fun and Games
"Baby Shark"	2020	—		Fun and Games
"When I'm Painting"	2020	—		Fun and Games
"Skinnamarink"	2020	—		Fun and Games
"Social Distancing"	2020	—		Choo Choo Trains, Propeller Planes & Toot Toot Chugga Chugga Big Red Car!
"Brush Your Teeth"	2020	—		Non-album singles
"Little Wiggles Theme Song"	2020	—		Non-album singles
"Trains, Planes and the Big Red Car"	2020	—		Choo Choo Trains, Propeller Planes & Toot Toot Chugga Chugga Big Red Car!
"Rocket Ship"	2020	—		Choo Choo Trains, Propeller Planes & Toot Toot Chugga Chugga Big Red Car!
"Emma's Bowmobile, Beep Beep!"	2020	—		Choo Choo Trains, Propeller Planes & Toot Toot Chugga Chugga Big Red Car!
"Digital Party!"	2020	—		Non-album singles
"Click Go the Shears (feat. The East Pointers)"	2020	—		Non-album singles
"The Twins Song – Double Happy"	2020	—		Lullabies with Love
"We're All Fruit Salad!" (featuring James Harkness, Jawan Jackson, Lou Diamond Phillips, Robert Rakete, Taylor Symone & Victor Valdes)	2021	—		We're All Fruit Salad! The Wiggles' Greatest Hits
"Elephant (Triple J Like a Version)"	2021	10	ARIA: Gold	ReWiggled
"The ABC New Zealand Alphabet Song (feat. Robert Rakete)"	2021	—		Non-album singles
"Humpty Dumpty Sat On A Wall"	2021	—		Non-album singles
"The Wellerman"	2021	—		ReWiggled
"Hey Tsehay!"	2021	—		Super Wiggles
"We're All Fruit Salad (triple j Live Recording 2021)"	2021	—		Non-album single
"Apple Crumble"	2022	—		ReWiggled
"Around the World"	2022	—		Non-album single
"Last Christmas"	2023	—		The Sound of Christmas
"Wiggle Up, Giddy Up" (with Dasha)	2025	—		Wiggle Up, Giddy Up!
"Say the Dance, Boots 'n' All" (with Kaylee Bell)	2025	—		Wiggle Up, Giddy Up!
"Friends!" (with Dolly Parton)	2025	—		Wiggle Up, Giddy Up!
"Counting 1 to 5"	2025	—		Wiggle Up, Giddy Up!
"—" denotes releases that did not chart.
