= List of songs recorded by the Wiggles =

This is a list of songs that have been released by the Wiggles. Spoken word tracks, alternate versions, tracks in multiple languages, and karaoke versions are not listed. In case where a song was recorded for more than one album, the first recording is noted.

== A-C ==
- "ABC" – Apples & Bananas
- "Advance Australia Fair" – Anthem - Celebration of Australia
- "Agapame Tin Athena (We Love Athens)" – Sailing Around the World
- "Alouette / Mimi's Dance" – Taking Off!
- "The Alphabet Ballet" - Big Ballet Day!
- "And the World Is One on Christmas Morning" – Yule Be Wiggling
- "Angels We Have Heard on High" – Yule Be Wiggling
- "Another Cuppa" – It's a Wiggly Wiggly World
- "Anthony's Workshop" – Whoo Hoo! Wiggly Gremlins!
- "Archie's Theme" (instrumental) – The Wiggles
- "(Are You Ready?) Do The Bus Stop – You Make Me Feel Like Dancing
- "Aspri Mera Key Ya Mas" (Greek Lullaby) – Go To Sleep Jeff
- "Australia Zoo" – Wiggly Safari
- "Away in a Manger" – Wiggly, Wiggly Christmas
- "Baby Beluga" – Wake Up Jeff! (AUS version)
- "Baby Keep Smiling" – Taking Off!
- "Balla Balla Bambina" – Toot, Toot!
- "Ballerina, Ballerina" – The Wiggles Movie Soundtrack
- "The Barrel Polka" – Sailing Around the World
- "Bathtime" – Toot Toot! (AUS version)
- "Beach, Beach, Sandy Beach" - Getting Strong
- "Beep Beep Buckle Up" – Taking Off!
- "Bert the Wombat" – Here Comes a Song
- "Big Red Boat" – Splish! Splash! Big Red Boat
- "Big Red Car" – Big Red Car
- "Big Strong John" - Super Wiggles
- "Bing Bang Bong (That's a Pirate Song)" – Wake up Jeff
- "Bit by Bit (We're Building a Set)" – Whoo Hoo! Wiggly Gremlins!
- "Blow Me Down" – It's a Wiggly Wiggly World
- "Blow Up Your Balloon (Huff & Huff & Puff)" – Racing to the Rainbow
- "Boating Song" – Wiggle House
- "Bok the Hand Puppet" - Fruit Salad TV
- "Bok the Super Puppet" - Super Wiggles
- "Boom Boom" – The Wiggles Movie Soundtrack
- "Boom, Boom, Boom, You're a Superhero" - Super Wiggles
- "Bound for South Australia" – Here Comes a Song
- "Bow Wow Wow" – Top of the Tots
- "BRC is the Big Red Car" – Wiggle House
- "Bricklayers Song" – Top of the Tots
- "Brisbane" – Sailing Around the World
- "Brown Girl in the Ring" – Big Red Car
- "Bucket of Dew/Paddy Condon From Cobar" – Wake up Jeff
- "Bump-A-Deedle" – Racing to the Rainbow
- "Butterflies Flit" – Yummy Yummy
- "Calling All Cows" – Top of the Tots
- "Camera One" – Whoo Hoo! Wiggly Gremlins!
- "Can You Dig It?" – Top of the Tots
- "Can You (Point Your Fingers and Do the Twist?)" – Big Red Car
- "Captain Feathersword" – Stories and Songs: The Adventures of Captain Feathersword the Friendly Pirate
- "Captain Feathersword Fell Asleep on His Pirate Ship" (also "Quack Quack") – Toot, Toot!
- "Captain Feathersword's Christmas Dance" – Santa's Rockin'!
- "Captain's Magic Buttons" – Hoop Dee Doo: It's a Wiggly Party
- "The Captain's Wavy Walk" – Sailing Around the World
- "Caveland" – Hoop Dee Doo: It's a Wiggly Party
- "Central Park New York" – Top of the Tots
- "C'est Wags, C'est Bon" – Wiggle Bay
- "The Chase" (Instrumental) – Yummy Yummy (NA version)
- "Chew Chew Song" – Racing to the Rainbow
- "Choppy Corker" - Super Wiggles
- "Christmas Around the World" – Yule Be Wiggling
- "Christmas Barcarolle" (Let the World Rejoice) – Santa's Rockin'!
- "Christmas Picnic" – Wiggly, Wiggly Christmas
- "Christmas Polka" – Yule Be Wiggling
- "Christmas Star" – Wiggly, Wiggly Christmas
- "Chu-Lu-Lu" – Wake Up Jeff! (AUS version)
- "Cielito Lindo" – Cold Spaghetti Western
- "Cluck, Cluck City" – Ukulele Baby
- "Cocky Want a Cracker" – Wiggly Safari
- "Come and Sail the Sea" – Here Comes a Song
- "Come on Down to Wiggle Town" - Wiggle Town!
- "Come on Everybody" (We'll Tap for You) – Yule Be Wiggling
- "Come on Let's Jump" – Yummy Yummy
- "Country Garden" (Instrumental) – You Make Me Feel Like Dancing
- "Cowboys and Cowgirls" – Top of the Tots
- "Crocodile Hunter" – Wiggly Safari
- "Crunchy Munchy Honey Cakes" – Yummy Yummy
- "Curoo Curoo (Carol of the Birds)" – Yule Be Wiggling

== D-F ==
- "D.O.R.O.T.H.Y (My Favourite Dinosaur)" – Yummy Yummy
- "Dance a Cachuca" – Wiggle Bay
- "Dance, Dance!" - Dance, Dance!
- "Dance the Gloomies Away" – Wiggle Bay
- "Dance the Ooby-Doo" – Hoop Dee Doo: It's a Wiggly Party
- "Dance to Your Daddy" – Taking Off!
- "Dancing Flowers" – Whoo Hoo! Wiggly Gremlins
- "Dancing in the Sand" – Wiggle Bay
- "Dancing on the High Seas" – Taking Off!
- "Dancing Ride" – Here Comes a Song
- "Daniel and Molly" – Here Comes a Song
- "Day-O (The Banana Boat Song)" – You Make Me Feel Like Dancing
- "Day of Joy, Day of Peace" (Hamish's Lullaby) – Santa's Rockin'!
- "Decorate the Tree" – Yule Be Wiggling
- "Di Dicki Do Dum" – Big Red Car
- "Ding Dong Merrily on High" – Wiggly, Wiggly Christmas
- "The Dingle Puck Goat" - Go Bananas
- "Dingo Tango" – Wiggly Safari
- "Do the Bus Stop" – You Make Me Feel Like Dancing
- "Do the Daddy Long Legs" – Racing to the Rainbow
- "Do the Flap" – Big Red Car
- "Do the Owl" – Wiggly Safari
- "Do the Propeller!" – Taking Off!
- "Do the Skeleton Scat" – Pumpkin Face
- "Do the Wiggle Groove" – Toot, Toot!
- "Dr. Knickerbocker" – You Make Me Feel Like Dancing
- "Doing a Dance" – Yule Be Wiggling
- "Doo, Doo-Doo, Doo!" – Ukulele Baby
- "Dorothy (Would You Like to Dance?)" – Wake up Jeff
- "Dorothy Queen of the Roses" – Wiggly Safari
- "Dorothy the Dinosaur" – The Wiggles
- "Dorothy the Dinosaur (Tell Me Who Is That Knocking?)" – Toot, Toot!
- "Dorothy's Birthday Party" – Here Comes a Song
- "Dorothy's Christmas Roses" – Santa's Rockin'!
- "Dorothy's Dance Party" – Big Red Car
- "The Dreaming Song" – Here Comes a Song
- "Dressing Up" – Whoo Hoo! Wiggly Gremlins!
- "Dungley Wobble" – Here Comes a Song
- "Eagle Rock" – Wiggle Bay
- "Elephant" (Triple J Like a Version) – ReWiggled
- "El Pato" – Cold Spaghetti Western
- "Elbow to Elbow" – Sailing Around the World
- "Emma (with the Bow in Her Hair)" – Taking Off!
- "Emma's Bow Minuet" – Wiggle House
- "Emma's Christmas Bow" – Go Santa Go
- "England Swings" – Let's Eat
- "Everybody Dance!" – Racing to the Rainbow
- "Everybody is Clever" – Wake Up Jeff! (AUS version)
- "Everybody's Here" – Taking Off!
- "Everybody I Have a Question" – Go Santa Go!
- "Everybody Loves a Little Puppy" – Ukulele Baby
- "Everybody Wiggle Along" – We're All Fruit Salad!: The Wiggles' Greatest Hits
- "The Fairy Dance" – You Make Me Feel Like Dancing
- "Fais Do Do" – Yummy Yummy
- "Family Song" – Here Comes a Song
- "Farewell to the Wiggly Trail" – Cold Spaghetti Western
- "Feeding Time" – Wiggly Safari
- "Feeling Chirpy" – Top of the Tots
- "Feeling Hungry" – Wiggle House
- "Feliz Navidad" – Wiggly, Wiggly Christmas
- "Fergus' Jig" (Instrumental) – Wiggle Bay
- "Fiesta Siesta" – Cold Spaghetti Western
- "Fire Engines" – Here Comes a Song
- "The First Noel" – Yule Be Wiggling
- "Five Little Ducks" – Wake Up Jeff
- "Five Little Joeys Jumping on the Bed" – Big Red Car
- "Fly Through the Air" – Here Comes a Song
- "Fly Through the Sky"- Top of the Tots
- "Follow the Bird"- Cold Spaghetti Western
- "Follow the Leader" – Getting Strong
- "Food Food Food (Oh How I Love My Food)" – Toot, Toot!
- "Foodman" – Cold Spaghetti Western
- "The Four Presents" – Big Red Car
- "A Friendly Little Spider" – Pumpkin Face
- "Friends of Dorothy" - Wiggle Up, Giddy Up!
- "A Frog Went a Walking" - Wake Up Jeff!
- "A Froggy He Would a Wooing-Go" – The Wiggles
- "Fruit Salad" – Yummy Yummy
- "The Full Moon Melody" – Pumpkin Face
- "Fun on the Farm" – Hoop Dee Doo: It's a Wiggly Party
- "Furry Wolfman" – Pumpkin Face

== G-I ==
- "Galloping Ballet" – Wiggle House
- "The Garbage Truck Song" - Super Wiggles
- "Georgia's Song" – Big Red Car
- "Get Ready to Wiggle" – The Wiggles
- "Getting Strong" – Getting Strong
- "Go Captain Feathersword, Ahoy!" – Toot, Toot!
- "Go Santa Go" – Wiggly, Wiggly Christmas
- "Go to Sleep Jeff" (Brahms' Lullaby) – Go To Sleep Jeff!
- "Going Home" – Wiggle Bay
- "Goldfish" – Sailing Around the World
- "Good Ship Fabulous Flea" – Ukulele Baby (Note: "Tie Me Kangaroo Down, Sport" and its introduction, and other songs were removed from digital download in July 2014 after Rolf Harris was convicted of indecent assault. However people can still listen to the song online such as certain videos on YouTube. – Cooper, Max (1 July 2014). "Harris stripped of ARIA induction". Brisbane Times.)
- "Goodbye from the Wiggles" - Getting Strong
- "Goodbye from Wiggle Town" - Wiggle Town
- "Great Big Man in Red" – Santa's Rockin'!
- "Guess What?" – Wake Up Jeff
- "Gulp Gulp" – Whoo Hoo! Wiggly Gremlins!
- "The Gypsy Rover" – Here Comes a Song
- "Haru Ga Kita" – It's a Wiggly Wiggly World
- "Hat on My Head" – Big Red Car
- "Hats" – Whoo Hoo! Wiggly Gremlins!
- "Have a Happy Birthday Captain" – Stories and Songs: The Adventures of Captain Feathersword the Friendly Pirate
- "Have a Very Merry Christmas" – Wiggly, Wiggly Christmas
- "Havenu Shalom Alechem" (Hebrew Song of Peace) – Wake up Jeff
- "Having Fun at the Beach" – Wake Up Jeff
- "Head, Shoulders, Knees and Toes" – Toot, Toot!
- "Hello Henry!" - The Wiggles Meet the Orchestra
- "Hello, We're the Wiggles" - Getting Strong
- "Henry Likes Water" - Rock & Roll Preschool
- "Henry the Champion Christmas Wrapper" – Santa's Rockin'!
- "Henry the Octopus" – Here Comes a Song
- "Henry's Christmas Dance" – Wiggly, Wiggly Christmas
- "Henry's Dance" – Big Red Car
- "Henry's Underwater Big Band" – Wake up Jeff
- "Here Come Our Friends" - Surfer Jeff
- "Here Come the Chicken" (also "The Chicken Song") – Racing to the Rainbow
- "Here Come the Reindeer" – Yule Be Wiggling
- "Here Come the Wiggles" – It's a Wiggly Wiggly World
- "Here Comes a Bear" – Here Comes a Song
- "Here Comes a Camel" - Go Bananas!
- "Here Comes Santa Claus" – The Spirit of Christmas 1998
- "Here We Go Dorothy" – Big Red Car
- "Here We Go Mexico City!" – Sailing Around the World
- "Hey, Billy Bat!" – Pumpkin Face
- "Hey Now, Let's Have a Party!" – Cold Spaghetti Western
- "Hey There Partner" – Top of the Tots
- "Hey There Wally" – The Wiggles Movie Soundtrack
- "Hey Tsehay!" - Super Wiggles
- "Hey Hey It's Saturday (Feat. Daly Somers)" – Ukulele Baby (AUS version)
- "Hey, Hey, Hey We're All Pirate Dancing" – It's a Wiggly Wiggly World
- "Hey, Wags!" - Wiggle House
- "Hoop-Dee-Doo" – Hoop Dee Doo: It's a Wiggly Party
- "Hot Poppin' Popcorn" – Hot Poppin' Popcorn
- "Hot Potato" – Yummy Yummy
- "House on the Hillside" – Wake up Jeff
- "Howling Wolf" – Pumpkin Face
- "Huddle Huddle Huddle Along" (The Football Song) – Racing to the Rainbow
- "Hula Hula Hula" (Nothing Could Be Cooler) – Sailing Around the World
- "Hula Hula Baby" – Ukulele Baby
- "Hula, Hula, Merry Christmas to Ya" - Go Santa Go
- "I'm a Cow" – Big Red Car
- "I'm Dorothy the Dinosaur!" - Hot Potatoes: The Best of the Wiggles
- "I'm John, I'm Strong!" - Fruit Salad TV
- "I'm a Scary Tiger" - Go Bananas!
- "I Am a Dancer" – Big Red Car
- "I Can Do So Many Things" – Wake up Jeff
- "I Climb Ten Stairs" – Toot, Toot!
- "I Drive The Big Red Car" – You Make Me Feel Like Dancing
- "I've Got My Glasses On!" – Taking Off!
- "I Just Can't Sleep on Christmas Eve!" It's Always Christmas with You'
- "I Like Scary Nights" – Pumpkin Face
- "I Look in the Mirror" – Here Comes a Song
- "I Love It When It Rains" – Here Comes a Song
- "I Love to Have a Dance with Dorothy" – It's a Wiggly Wiggly World
- "I Skate and Wear Yellow" - Fruit Salad TV
- "I Stamp" – Pumpkin Face
- "I Want to Wear the Jacket" – Here Comes The Big Red Car
- "I Wave My Arms and Swing My Baton" – Top of the Tots
- "Il Clan Dei Siciliani" - Ukulele Baby
- "I'll Tell Me Ma" – Apples and Bananas
- "In the Big Red Car We Like to Ride" – It's a Wiggly Wiggly World
- "In the Wiggles' World" – It's a Wiggly Wiggly World
- "Is There a Superhero Around?" - Super Wiggles
- "It's Always Christmas with You" - It's Always Christmas with You
- "It's a Christmas Party on the Good Ship Feathersword" – Wiggly, Wiggly Christmas
- "It's A Long Way From the North Pole" - It's Always Christmas with You
- "If Your Happy and You Know It" - Nursery Rhymes
- "It's A Long Way to the Top (If You Wanna Rock & Roll)" - Andrew Denton's Musical Challenge
- "Itchy Fingers (Jimmy's Sea Shanty)" - Duets

== J-L ==
- "Jeff's Christmas Tune" – Wiggly, Wiggly Christmas
- "Jimmy the Elf" – Yule Be Wiggling
- "Jingle Bells" – Wiggly, Wiggly Christmas
- "Joannie Works with One Hammer" – Big Red Car
- "John Bradlelum" – Toot, Toot!
- "John O'Dreams" – Go To Sleep, Jeff
- "Johnny Works with One Hammer" – The Wiggles
- "Joseph John's Lullaby" – The Wiggles
- "Just Can't Wait for Christmas Day" – Yule Be Wiggling
- "Knead Some Dough" – Top of the Tots
- "Knock Knock, Who's There?" – Whoo Hoo! Wiggly Gremlins!
- "Koala La La" – Wiggly Safari
- "Kookaburra Choir" – Wiggly Safari
- "La Bamba" – You Make Me Feel Like Dancing
- "Lachy's Lullaby" – Big Ballet Day!
- "La Cucaracha" – Hoop Dee Doo: It's a Wiggly Party
- "La Paloma" – Ukulele Baby
- "Laughing Doctor" – Wiggle House
- "Lavender's Blue" – The Wiggles
- "Lechoo Yeladim" (Hebrew: Go children) – Here Comes a Song
- "Let's Clap Hands for Santa Claus" – Wiggly, Wiggly Christmas
- "Let's Go (We're Riding in the Big Red Car)" – It's a Wiggly Wiggly World
- "Let's Go Swimming" – Top of the Tots
- "Let's Go to the Great Western Café" – Cold Spaghetti Western
- "Let's Have a Barbie on the Beach" – Wiggle Bay
- "Let's Have a Ceili" (Instrumental) – Toot, Toot!
- "Let's Have a Party" – The Wiggles Movie Soundtrack
- "Let's Make Some Rosy Tea" – Wiggle Bay
- "Let's Spend a Day at the Beach" – Hoop Dee Doo: It's a Wiggly Party
- "Lettuce Sing" (Fresh Fruit and Veggies) – Top of the Tots
- "Lights, Camera, Action, Wiggles!" – Whoo Hoo! Wiggly Gremlins!
- "The Lion and the Unicorn" – Here Comes a Song
- "Listen to the Drummer Playing" – Cold Spaghetti Western
- "Little Brown Ant" – Here Comes a Song
- "Little Bunny Foo-Foo" – Taking Off!
- "Little Children" – Hoop Dee Doo: It's a Wiggly Party
- "The Little Drummer Boy" – Yule Be Wiggling
- "Little Sir Echo" - Wiggle House
- "Little Vampires" – Pumpkin Face
- "London Town" – Sailing Around the World
- "Look Both Ways" – Toot, Toot!
- "Love Train" – Racing to the Rainbow
- "Lullabies With Love" – Lullabies With Love
- "Lullaby Overture" – Go to Sleep Jeff

== M-P ==
- "Magic Club Music" – The Wiggles Movie Soundtrack
- "Magic Kindy" – Here Comes a Song
- "Maranoa Lullaby" – The Wiggles
- "Marie's Wedding" – Hoop Dee Doo: It's a Wiggly Party
- "Mary's Boy Child" – Santa's Rockin'!
- "The Master Pasta Maker (From Italy)" – Cold Spaghetti Western
- "Meteorology" (The Study of the Atmosphere) – Taking Off!
- "Mischief the Monkey" – The Wiggles
- "Mitten the Kitten" – Here Comes a Song
- "The Monkey, the Bird and the Bear" - Go Bananas
- "Monkey Dance" – Yummy Yummy
- "Monkey Man" (Feat. Kylie Minogue) – Go Bananas
- "Montezuma" (Instrumental) – The Wiggles
- "The Mooche" (Instrumental) – You Make Me Feel Like Dancing
- "Mop Mop" – Sailing Around the World
- "Morningtown Ride" – It's a Wiggly Wiggly World
- "Move Like an Emu" – Hoop Dee Doo: It's a Wiggly Party
- "Move Your Arms Like Henry" – Toot, Toot!
- "Mrs. Bingles Theme" – The Wiggles Movie Soundtrack
- "Mumbles the Monster" – Pumpkin Face
- "Murray Had a Turtle" – Pop Goes the Wiggles
- "Murray's Christmas Samba" – Yule Be Wiggling
- "Music Box Dancer" – Racing to the Rainbow
- "Music with Murray" – Whoo Hoo! Wiggly Gremlins!
- "My New Shoes" – Big Red Car
- "Name Game" – Wake up Jeff
- "New York Firefighter" – Top of the Tots
- "Nicky Nacky Nocky Noo" – Big Red Car
- "Numbers Rhumba" – Yummy Yummy
- "Nya Nya Nya" – The Wiggles Movie Soundtrack – tune is "I'll Tell Me Ma"
- "O Come All Ye Faithful" – Santa's Rockin'!
- "O Epoe Tooki Tooki" – The Wiggles
- "October Winds" – Go to Sleep, Jeff
- "Officer Beaples' Dance" (Instrumental) – Toot, Toot!
- "Okki Tokki Unga" – The Wiggles
- "Old Dan Tucker" – You Make Me Feel Like Dancing
- "Old Man Emu" – Wiggly Safari
- “Old Macdonald Had A Farm” - “Sing A Song Of Wiggles”
- "Olive Oil" – Cold Spaghetti Western
- "Olive Oil Is My Secret Ingredient" – Surfer Jeff
- "On Your Holiday" – Big Red Car
- "One Finger, One Thumb" – You Make Me Feel Like Dancing
- "One Little Coyote" – It's a Wiggly Wiggly World
- "Ooey Ooey Ooey Allergies" – Surfer Jeff
- "Ooh It's Captain Feathersword" – The Wiggles Movie Soundtrack
- "Open Wide Look Inside At the Dentist" – Top of the Tots
- "Open, Shut Them" - Apples and Bananas
- "Our Boat Is Rocking on the Sea" – Stories and Songs: The Adventures of Captain Feathersword the Friendly Pirate
- "Over in the Meadow" - Sing a Song of Wiggles
- "Paw, Paw Wags" - It's Always Christmas with You
- "Peanut Butter" – Taking Off!
- "The Pennsylvania Polka" – Sailing Around the World
- "Picking Flowers" – Top of the Tots
- "Pipers Waltz" – Wake up Jeff
- "Play Your Guitar with Murray" – Hoop Dee Doo: It's a Wiggly Party
- "Playhouse Disney Theme" (both generic and character versions) - Playhouse Disney 2
- "Poesje Mauw" – Here Comes a Song
- "Polly Put the Kettle On" – Racing to the Rainbow
- "Ponies" – Yummy Yummy
- "Porcupine Pie" – It's a Wiggly Wiggly World
- "The Princess of the Sea" – Racing to the Rainbow
- "Pufferbillies" – Big Red Car
- "Pumpkin Face" – Pumpkin Face

== Q-S ==
- "Quack Quack" – see "Captain Feathersword Fell Asleep On His Pirate Ship"
- "Rainbow of Colours" – Racing to the Rainbow
- "Ready, Steady, Wiggle" – Taking Off!
- "Reindeer Express" – Wiggly, Wiggly Christmas
- "Ring-A-Ding-A-Ding Dong!" – Santa's Rockin'!
- "The Road to the Isles (Do the Highland Fling)" - Dance, Dance
- "Rock & Roll Preschool" - Rock & Roll Preschool
- "Rock-A-Bye Your Bear" – The Wiggles
- "Rocket" – Toot Toot!
- "Rockin' and a Rollin' Sea" – The Wiggles Movie Soundtrack
- "Rockin' on the Water" – Racing to the Rainbow
- "Rockin' Santa!" – Santa's Rockin'!
- "Roll the Acrobats" - Wiggle House
- "Rolling Down the Sandhills" – Wiggle Bay
- "Romp Bomp a Stomp" – Wake up Jeff
- "Row, Row, Row Your Boat" – Racing to the Rainbow
- "Rudolph the Red Nosed Reindeer" – Wiggly, Wiggly Christmas
- "Run Around Run Run" – Hoop Dee Doo It's a Wiggly Party
- "Sailing Around the World" – Sailing Around the World
- "A Sailor Went to Sea" – You Make Me Feel Like Dancing
- "San Francisco Trolley Car" – Sailing Around the World
- "Sanctissima" – Big Red Car
- "Say Aah At the Doctors" – Top of the Tots
- "Scary Ghost" – Pumpkin Face
- "A Scottish Christmas" (Instrumental) – Yule Be Wiggling
- "Shake Your Sillies Out" – Yummy Yummy
- "Shakin' Like a Leafy Tree" – Racing to the Rainbow
- "Shaky Shaky" – Yummy Yummy
- "The Shimmie Shake!" – You Make Me Feel Like Dancing
- "Sicily (I Want to Go)" – Sailing Around the World
- "Silent Night" – Wiggly, Wiggly Christmas
- "Silver Bells (That Ring in the Night)" – Toot Toot! (AUS version)
- "Simon Says" – Taking Off!
- "Simon's Cold Water Blues" – Taking Off!
- "Sing a Song of Polly" – Here Comes a Song
- "Sing with Me" – It's a Wiggly Wiggly World
- "Sleep Safe, My Baby – Let's Eat!
- "Six Months in a Leaky Boat (Wiggly Version)" – It's a Wiggly Wiggly World
- "Snakes (You Can Look but You Better Not Touch)" – Wiggly Safari
- "Sorry Again" – Here Comes the Big Red Car
- "The Sound of Halloween" – Pumpkin Face
- "Spot the Dalmatian" – The Wiggles
- "Stamp Your Feet (To the Heavy Beat)" – Racing to the Rainbow
- "Star Lullaby" – The Wiggles
- "The Story of Thomas the Turkey" – You Make Me Feel Like Dancing
- "Suo Gan" – The Wiggles
- "Sur le Pont d'Avignon" - Apples and Bananas
- "Surfer Jeff" – Surfer Jeff
- "Swedish Rhapsody" – You Make Me Feel Like Dancing
- "Swim Henry Swim" – Hoop Dee Doo It's a Wiggly Party
- "Swim Like a Fish" – Wiggle Bay
- "Swim with Me" – Wiggly Safari
- "Sydney Barcarolle" – Sailing Around the World

== T-V ==
- "Taba Naba" – It's a Wiggly Wiggly World
- "Take a Trip Out on the Sea" – Wake up Jeff
- "Tales of the Symphony Orchestra" - The Wiggles Meet The Orchestra
- "Tales of the Vienna Woods" (Instrumental) – You Make Me Feel Like Dancing
- "Tap Wags" – The Wiggles Movie Soundtrack
- "Teddy Bear Hug" – Big Red Car
- "Teddy Bear's Big Day Out" – Racing to the Rainbow
- Teddy Bear Teddy Bear Turn Around – Pop Go the Wiggles
- "Testing, One, Two, Three" – Whoo Hoo! Wiggly Gremlins!
- "Thank You, Mr. Weatherman" – Ukulele Baby (NA version)
- "This Old Man" – The Wiggles
- "This Little Baby is Born Again" – Santa's Rockin'!
- "Three Animals" – Here Comes a Song
- "Three Little Pumpkins" – Pumpkin Face
- "Tick Tock (All Night Long)" – Top of the Tots
- "Tidy Up Song" – Here Comes a Song
- "Tie Me Kangaroo Down, Sport" – It's a Wiggly Wiggly World
- "The Toilet Song" - The Wiggles' Big Ballet Day!
- "Toot, Toot, Chugga, Chugga, Big Red Car" – Toot, Toot!
- "The Tra-La-La Song" – Racing to the Rainbow
- "Treasure Chest" – Stories and Songs: The Adventures of Captain Feathersword the Friendly Pirate
- "Trick or Treat" – Pumpkin Face
- "Turkey in the Straw" – You Make Me Feel Like Dancing
- "Twinkle Twinkle Little Star" – Pop Go the Wiggles
- "Two Little Dickie Birds" – You Make Me Feel Like Dancing
- "Uncle Noah's Ark" – Here Comes a Song
- "The Unicorn" - "Go Bananas!"
- "Unto Us, This Holy Night" – Wiggly, Wiggly Christmas
- "Vegetable Soup" – Whoo Hoo! Wiggly Gremlins!
- "Veil" (Instrumental) – Yummy Yummy
- "Vini Vini" – The Wiggles

== W-Z ==
- "Wags Ate the Rags" – Wiggly, Wiggly Christmas
- "Wags Is Bouncing Around the Christmas Tree" – Wiggly, Wiggly Christmas
- "Wags Loves to Shake Shake" – Yule Be Wiggling
- "Wags Stop Your Barking, It's Almost Christmas Day!" – Santa's Rockin'!
- "Wags the Dog" – Big Red Car
- "Wags the Dog, He Likes to Tango" – Toot, Toot!
- "Wah Hoo Hey, I'm Combing My Hair Today" – Toot, Toot!
- "Wake Up!" – Rock & Roll Preschool
- "Wake Up Jeff!" – Wake up Jeff
- "Wake Up Lachy!" – Furry Tales
- "Walk" – Yummy Yummy
- "Walk On The Wild Side" - Andrew Denton's Musical Challenge 2: Even More Challenged!
- "Walking on the Moon" – Top Of The Tots
- "Wally's Dream Music" – The Wiggles Movie Soundtrack
- "Watching the Waves" – Wiggle Bay
- "Wave to Wags" – Wake up Jeff
- "We're All Friends" – Here Comes a Song
- "We're All Fruit Salad" – We're All Fruit Salad!: The Wiggles' Greatest Hits
- "We're Dancing with Wags the Dog" – Toot, Toot!
- "We're Playing a Trick on the Captain" – Stories and Songs: The Adventures of Captain Feathersword the Friendly Pirate
- "We're the Cowboys" – Cold Spaghetti Western
- "We're the Crocodile Band" – Wiggly Safari
- "We Like to Say Hello" – Wake up Jeff
- "We Wish You a Merry Christmas" – Wiggly, Wiggly Christmas
- "Welcome to Network Wiggles!" – Whoo Hoo! Wiggly Gremlins
- "What's This Button For?" – Wiggle Bay
- "Wheels on the Bus" – Racing to the Rainbow
- "When I Hear the Music of the Orchestra" - The Wiggles Meet the Orchestra
- "When I Strum My Ukulele" – Ukulele Baby
- "Whenever I Hear This Music" – Here Comes a Song
- "Where's Jeff?" – Whoo Hoo! Wiggly Gremlins!
- "Where Is Thumbkin?" – Yummy Yummy
- "Who Got The Bones?" – Taking Off!
- "Who Killed Cock Robin?" – Pumpkin Face
- "Who's in The Wiggle House?" - Wiggle House
- "Wiggle Bay" – Wiggle Bay
- "Wiggle Hula" – Hoop Dee Doo: It's a Wiggly Party
- "Wigglemix" – The Wiggles Movie Soundtrack
- "Wiggletto" - Dance, Dance!
- "Wiggly Medley" – The Wiggles Movie Soundtrack
- Wiggly Christmas Medley – Live Hot Potatoes
- "The Wiggly Owl Medley" – Wiggly Safari
- "Wiggly Party" – Hoop Dee Doo: It's a Wiggly Party
- Wiggly Sports Theme (Instrumental) – Whoo Hoo! Wiggly Gremlins!, see also "Rolling Down the Sandhills"
- "The Wiggly Trail" – Cold Spaghetti Western
- "Wiggly, Wiggly Christmas" – Wiggly, Wiggly Christmas
- "Willaby Wallaby Woo" – Yummy Yummy
- "Witchy-Woo, Ooh, Ooh, Ooh!" – Pumpkin Face
- "Wind, Rain and the Sea" – Stories and Songs: The Adventures of Captain Feathersword the Friendly Pirate
- "Windmills" – Wake up Jeff
- "Wobbly Camel" – Wiggly Safari
- "The Wobbly Dance" – Hoop Dee Doo: It's a Wiggly Party
- "The Wonder of Wiggle Town" - Wiggle Town!
- "Would You Giggle?" – Yummy Yummy
- "Would You Like To Go To Scotland?" – Surfer Jeff
- "Yawn Yawn Yawn" – Yummy Yummy
- "You Make Me Feel Like Dancing" (Feat. Leo Sayer) – You Make Me Feel Like Dancing
- "You Might Like a Pet" – Wiggly Safari
- "Yule Be Wiggling" – Yule Be Wiggling
- "Zamel the Camel Has Five Humps" – Wiggle House
- "Zardo Zap" – Toot, Toot!
- "The Zeezap Song" – Wiggle Bay
- "Zing Zang Wing Wang Wong"- Wiggle Bay
- "Zombie Feet" – Pumpkin Face
- "Zoological Gardens" – Hoop Dee Doo: It's a Wiggly Party

== See also ==
- The Wiggles discography
