= List of guest stars with The Wiggles =

The Wiggles are an Australian children's music group. Just as Sesame Street often has special guest stars, famous Australians and worldwide celebrities will appear and perform with The Wiggles. List does not include recurring actors and crew members (e.g. Wiggly dancers, child dancers, family members and friends) or acts in which The Wiggles were part of a larger entertainment group or event (e.g. Carols in the Domain).

== A ==
- Christine Anu (It's a Wiggly Wiggly World, Wiggle Town)
- Anúna (It's Always Christmas With You)
- Atsuko Arai (It's a Wiggly Wiggly World)
- Francis Awaritefe (The Wiggles Presents: Dorothy the Dinosaur's Memory Book)
- The Australian Ballet (The Wiggles' Big Ballet Day!)

== B ==
- Rachael Beck (The Wiggles Presents: Dorothy the Dinosaur's Memory Book)

== C ==
- David Campbell (Rock and Roll Preschool)
- Troy Cassar-Daley (You Make Me Feel Like Dancing, Sing a Song of Wiggles, The Wiggles Presents: Dorothy the Dinosaur's Memory Book)
- Beccy Cole (Splish Splash Big Red Boat) - country music singer who appears as Beccy Bluegrass.

== D ==
- Smoky Dawson (Racing to the Rainbow)
- Melissa Doyle
- Slim Dusty (It's a Wiggly Wiggly World)

== F ==
- Joey Fatone (from NSYNC) (It's Always Christmas With You)
- Tim Finn (It's a Wiggly Wiggly World)
- John Fogerty (Santa's Rockin'!)

== G ==
- Kathy Gothadjaka (The Wiggles Presents: Dorothy the Dinosaur's Memory Book)

== H ==
- Rolf Harris (It's a Wiggly Wiggly World, Ukulele Baby)
- Lee Hawkins (Apples & Bananas), (Wiggle House)
- Paul Hester (drummer for both Split Enz and Crowded House) as the chef (Yummy Yummy)
- David Hobson (The Wiggles Presents: Dorothy the Dinosaur's Memory Book)
- Human Nature (It's a Wiggly Wiggly World album only)

== I ==
- Steve Irwin (Wiggly Safari)
- Terri Irwin (Wiggly Safari, Duets)
- Bindi Irwin (Wiggly Safari, Duets)
- Robert Irwin (Duets)

== K ==
- Kamahl (It's a Wiggly Wiggly World, Racing to the Rainbow)
- Amanda Keller (Splish Splash Big Red Boat) - appears as Dr. Verygood
- Jane Kennedy (The Wiggles Presents: Dorothy the Dinosaur's Memory Book)

== L ==
- Jay Laga'aia (Go Santa Go)
- Brett Lee (The Wiggles Show) - cricketer, appears as himself
- Jimmy Little (It's a Wiggly Wiggly World)

== M ==
- Joy McKean (Wiggle Town!)
- The Melbourne Symphony Orchestra (Meet the Orchestra)
- Mental as Anything (Let's Eat)
- Kylie Minogue (Go Bananas!)
- Morgan Crowley (Yule Be Wiggling and Hoop-Dee-Doo: It's A Wiggly Party)

== N ==
- The New England Patriots (specifically Adam Vinatieri, Wesley Britt, Eric Alexander, Michael McGrew, Bam Childress, Raymond Ventrone, P. K. Sam, and Ryan Krug) (Racing to the Rainbow)
- Bert Newton (Go Santa Go)
- Patti Newton (Go Santa Go)

== P ==
- Georgie Parker (Racing to the Rainbow)
- Kieren Perkins (Top of the Tots)
- Lou Diamond Phillips (Rock and Roll Preschool)
- Dennisha Pratt (Apples & Bananas) former Sprout host.

== R ==
- Robert Rakete (Wiggle House), (Rock and Roll Preschool)
- Joel Reddy (Go Santa Go)
- Jamie Redfern (Hot Poppin' Popcorn, Hot Potatoes: The Best of the Wiggles)
- Al Roker (Ukulele Baby American release)
- John Rowe (The Wiggles Presents: Dorothy the Dinosaur's Memory Book)

== S ==
- Joanne Samuel (The Wiggles Movie)
- Leo Sayer (You Make Me Feel Like Dancing, The Wiggles Presents: Dorothy the Dinosaur's Memory Book)
- Daryl Somers (Ukulele Baby Australian release)
- Don Spencer (The Wiggles Presents: Dorothy the Dinosaur's Memory Book)
- Dan Sultan (Wiggle Pop!)

== T ==
- Tom McGlynn (Let's Eat)
- Lote Tuqiri (Go Santa Go)

== U ==
- Keith Urban (Let's Eat album only)

== W ==
- John Waters (Go Bananas) - British-born Australian actor
- Barry Williams (Santa's Rockin'!)
- Ross Wilson (Space Dancing, Santa's Rockin'!, concert video clips)

== Y ==
- John Paul Young (It's Always Christmas With You)

== Notable celebrity appearances at Wiggles concerts ==
- Jimmy Barnes - Concert for UNICEF 25 May 2008 where he donned a black skivvy and performed "Wake Up Jeff".
- Shaquille O'Neal - cameo where he went on-stage for "Hot Potato"
- Al Roker - The Wiggles Australia Day concert special, 26 January 2011, where he wears a grape costume for the "Fruit Salad" song.
- James Hetfield. During a show in San Francisco, the Wiggles spotted Hetfield in the audience with his two daughters. During the song "Quack Quack", Murray played an impromptu solo from the Metallica hit, "Enter Sandman". When the song was finished, Hetfield stood up and did a heavy metal sign with his fingers.
