= Hot Potatoes: The Best of the Wiggles =

2009 compilation album by The Wiggles

Hot Potatoes! The Best of the Wiggles

Compilation album by the Wiggles
- Released: 7 May 2009
- Genre: Children's music
- Label: ABC
- Producer: Anthony Field

The Wiggles chronology
Hot Poppin' Popcorn (2009)	Hot Potatoes! The Best of the Wiggles (2009)	Let's Eat (2010)

Professional ratings
Review scores
Source	Rating
Allmusic	4/5 stars

Hot Potatoes: The Best of the Wiggles is a compilation album by the Wiggles which features their greatest hits. The album was released on 7 May 2009. The album includes a track with James Burton on guitar and another track with Paul Hester on drums. Guest vocalists are Rolf Harris, Steve Irwin, Leo Sayer, Kylie Minogue, John Fogerty and Jamie Redfern. The CD version was released in 2009, while the DVD version was originally released in 2010 and re-released in 2014.

== Track list ==
No.	Title	Music	Length
1.	"Hot Potato" (from Yummy Yummy)	Murray Cook, Jeff Fatt, Anthony Field, Greg Page, John Field
2.	"Can You (Point Your Fingers and Do the Twist?)" (from Here Comes the Big Red Car)	Cook, Fatt, Field, Page
3.	"Fruit Salad" (from Yummy Yummy)	Cook, Fatt, Field, Page
4.	"Rock-a-Bye Your Bear" (from The Wiggles Movie Soundtrack)	Cook, Fatt, Field, Page
5.	"Toot Toot, Chugga Chugga, Big Red Car" (from Toot Toot!)	Cook, Fatt, Field, Page
6.	"Wake Up Jeff!" (from It's Time to Wake Up Jeff!)	Cook, Fatt, Field, Page
7.	"Wiggly Party" (from Hoop Dee Doo: It's a Wiggly Party)	Cook, Fatt, Field, Page, Craig Abercrombie, John Field
8.	"Captain Feathersword Fell Asleep on His Pirate Ship (Quack Quack)" (from Toot Toot!)	Cook, Fatt, Field, Page
9.	"Wiggle Bay" (from Wiggle Bay)	Cook, Fatt, Field, Page, John Field, Dominic Lindsay
10.	"The Monkey Dance" (from Yummy Yummy)	Cook, Fatt, Field, Page, John Field
11.	"Get Ready to Wiggle" (from Wiggle Time!)	Cook, Fatt, Field, Page, John Field
12.	"Go Santa Go" (from Wiggly, Wiggly Christmas)	John Field
13.	"Dorothy (Would You Like To Dance?)" (from It's Time to Wake Up Jeff!)	Cook, Fatt, Field, Page
14.	"Ooh It's Captain Feathersword" (from The Wiggles Movie Soundtrack)	John Field
15.	"Tie Me Kangaroo Down Sport" (from It's a Wiggly Wiggly World)	Rolf Harris
16.	"Dressing Up" (from Whoo Hoo! Wiggly Gremlins!)	Cook, Fatt, Field, Page, John Field, Lindsay
17.	"Move Your Arms Like Henry" (from Toot Toot!)	Paul Field
18.	"Lights, Camera, Action, Wiggles!" (from Whoo Hoo! Wiggly Gremlins!)	Cook, Fatt, Field, Page, John Field, Lindsay
19.	"Do the Owl" (from Wiggly Safari)	Cook, Fatt, Field, Page, John Field, Lindsay, Steve Irwin
20.	"The Zeezap Song" (from Wiggle Bay)	Cook, Fatt, Field, Page, John Field, Lindsay, Greg Truman
21.	"Play Your Guitar with Murray" (from Hoop Dee Doo: It's a Wiggly Party)	Cook, Fatt, Field, Page
22.	"Rockin' Santa!" (from Santa's Rockin'!)	Cook, Fatt, Field, Page, John Field, Lindsay
23.	"To Have a Tea Party" (from Getting Strong!)	Cook, Fatt, Field, Page, John Field, Lindsay
24.	"Here Come the Chicken" (from Racing to the Rainbow)	Cook, Fatt, Field, Page
25.	"Getting Strong!" (from Getting Strong!)	Cook, Fatt, Field, Page, John Field, Lindsay
26.	"Murray Had a Turtle" (from Pop Go the Wiggles!)	Trad
27.	"Twinkle, Twinkle Little Star" (from Pop Go the Wiggles!)	Trad
28.	"I'm Dorothy the Dinosaur" (from Dorothy the Dinosaur)	Cook, Fatt, Field, Page, Paul Field
29.	"You Make Me Feel Like Dancing" (from You Make Me Feel Like Dancing)	Leo Sayer, Vincent Poncia
30.	"Dr Knickerbocker" (from You Make Me Feel Like Dancing)	Trad
31.	"The Shimmie Shake!" (from You Make Me Feel Like Dancing)	John Field, Paul Field
32.	"Over in the Meadow" (from Sing a Song of Wiggles)	Trad
33.	"Wags the Dog is Chasing His Tail" (from Go Bananas!)	Cook, Fatt, Field, Moran, John Field, Paddick
34.	"Monkey Man" (from Go Bananas!)	Frederick Hibbert

== Personnel ==
The Wiggles

- Murray Cook
- Jeff Fatt
- Anthony Field
- Greg Page
- Sam Moran

Production

- Anthony Field – producer, musical arrangements
- Dominic Lindsay – musical and string arrangements

== Charts ==
Chart performance for Hot Potatoes: The Best of the Wiggles
Chart (2009)	Peak position
Australian Albums (ARIA)	88

== 2013 album ==
Hot Potatoes! The Best of the Wiggles

Compilation album by the Wiggles
- Released: 22 November 2013
- Genre: Children's music
- Label: ABC
- Producer: Anthony Field

The Wiggles chronology
Go Santa Go! (2013)	Hot Potatoes! The Best of the Wiggles (2013)	Apples & Bananas (2014)

=== Track listing ===
No.	Title	Music	Length
1.	"Hot Potato" (from Yummy Yummy)	Murray Cook, Jeff Fatt, Anthony Field, Greg Page, John Field
2.	"Can You (Point Your Fingers and Do the Twist?)" (from Here Comes the Big Red Car)	Cook, Fatt, Field, Page
3.	"Do the Propeller" (from Taking Off!)	Fatt, Field, John Field
4.	"Monkey Man" (from Go Bananas!)	Frederick Hibbert
5.	"Rock-a-Bye Your Bear" (from The Wiggles Movie Soundtrack)	Cook, Fatt, Field, Page
6.	"Toot Toot, Chugga Chugga, Big Red Car" (from Toot, Toot!)	Cook, Fatt, Field, Page
7.	"Twinkle, Twinkle Little Star" (from Pumpkin Face)	Trad
8.	"You Make Me Feel Like Dancing" (from You Make Me Feel Like Dancing)	Leo Sayer, Vincent Poncia
9.	"Wake Up Jeff!" (from It's Time to Wake Up Jeff!)	Cook, Fatt, Field, Page
10.	"Captain Feathersword Fell Asleep on His Pirate Ship (Quack Quack)" (from Toot, Toot!)	Cook, Fatt, Field, Page
11.	"Ready, Steady Wiggle!" (from Furry Tales)	Fatt, Field, Paul Field, Gillespie, Pryce, Watkins
12.	"Getting Strong!" (from Getting Strong!)	Cook, Fatt, Field, Page, John Field, Dominic Lindsay
13.	"Wiggle Bay" (from Wiggle Bay)	Cook, Fatt, Field, Page, John Field, Lindsay
14.	"The Monkey Dance" (from Yummy Yummy)	Cook, Fatt, Field, Page, John Field
15.	"Everybody, I Have a Question" (from Go Santa Go)	Field, Gillespie, Pryce, Watkins
16.	"Get Ready to Wiggle" (from Wiggle Time)	Cook, Fatt, Field, Page, John Field
17.	"The Shimmie Shake" (from You Make Me Feel Like Dancing)	John Field, Paul Field
18.	"Go Santa Go" (from Wiggly, Wiggly Christmas)	John Field
19.	"Dorothy (Would Like to Dance?)" (from It's Time to Wake Up Jeff!)	Cook, Fatt, Field, Page
20.	"Ooey, Ooey, Ooey Allergies!" (from Pumpkin Face)	Cook, Fatt, Field, John Field, Pryce
21.	"Ooh It's Captain Feathersword" (from The Wiggles Movie Soundtrack)	John Field
22.	"Dressing Up" (from Whoo Hoo Wiggly Gremlins)	Cook, Fatt, Field, Page, John Field, Lindsay
23.	"Murray Had a Turtle" (from Pop Goes The Wiggles!)	Trad
24.	"Michael Finnegan" (from Apples and Bananas)	Trad
25.	"Move Your Arms Like Henry" (from Toot, Toot!)	Paul Field
26.	"Lights, Camera, Action, Wiggles!" (from Whoo Hoo Wiggly Gremlins)	Cook, Fatt, Field, Page, John Field, Lindsay
27.	"I'm Dorothy the Dinosaur" (from Dorothy the Dinosaur)	Cook, Fatt, Field, Page, Paul Field
28.	"Simon Says" (from Taking Off!)	Trad
29.	"Do the Owl" (from Wiggly Safari)	Cook, Fatt, Field, Page, John Field, Lindsay, Steve Irwin
30.	"Play Your Guitar with Murray" (from Hoop Dee Doo: It's a Wiggly Party)	Cook, Fatt, Field, Page
31.	"I've Got My Glasses On!" (from Taking Off!)	Fatt, Field, John Field
32.	"Hot Poppin' Popcorn" (from Hot Poppin' Popcorn)	Cook, Fatt, Field, Moran, John Field, Paddick
33.	"Rockin' Santa!" (from Santa's Rockin'!)	Cook, Fatt, Field, Page, John Field, Lindsay
34.	"Here Come the Chicken" (from Racing to the Rainbow)	Cook, Fatt, Field, Page
35.	"Say the Dance, Do the Dance" (from Furry Tales)	John Field

== Credits for 'Hot Potatoes! The Best of The Wiggles' CD ==
The Wiggles: Anthony Field, Lachlan Gillespie, Simon Pryce, Emma Watkins, Murray Cook, Jeff Fatt, Sam Moran, Greg Page

Music Produced By: Anthony Field

String Arrangements By: Dominic Lindsay

== Video ==
The video is a 2010 compilation video, containing some of their best songs. Unlike other songs, the video version of "Ooh It's Captain Feathersword" is sung by Sam Moran since it was from Wiggledancing! Live in Concert.

=== Songs ===
1. Hot Potato
2. Can You (Point Your Fingers and Do the Twist?)
3. Fruit Salad
4. Rock-a-Bye Your Bear
5. Toot Toot, Chugga Chugga, Big Red Car
6. Wake Up Jeff!
7. Wiggly Party
8. Captain Feathersword Fell Asleep on His Pirate Ship (Quack Quack)
9. Wiggle Bay
10. The Monkey Dance
11. Get Ready to Wiggle
12. Go Santa Go
13. Dorothy (Would You Like to Dance with Me?)
14. Ooh It's Captain Feathersword
15. Tie Me Kangaroo Down Sport (featuring Rolf Harris)
16. Dressing Up
17. Move Your Arms Like Henry (featuring Paul Hester on Drums)
18. Lights, Camera, Action, Wiggles!
19. Do the Owl (featuring Steve Irwin)
20. The Zeezap Song
21. Play Your Guitar with Murray
22. Rockin' Santa (featuring John Fogerty)
23. To Have a Tea Party
24. Here Come the Chicken (featuring James Burton on Guitar)
25. Getting Strong!
26. Murray Had a Turtle
27. Twinkle, Twinkle Little Star
28. I'm Dorothy the Dinosaur!
29. You Make Me Feel Like Dancing (featuring Leo Sayer)
30. Dr Knickerbocker
31. The Shimmie Shake
32. Over in the Meadow
33. Wags the Dog is Chasing His Tail
34. Monkey Man (featuring Kylie Minogue)
35. Hot Poppin Popcorn (featuring Jamie Redfern)

== 2014 video ==
Hot Potatoes! The Best Of The Wiggles is a 2014 update to the 2010 video of the same name. It is a compilation featuring some of The Wiggles' best songs from every generation.

=== Song list ===
1. Hot Potato
2. Can You (Point Your Fingers And Do The Twist?)
3. Do the Propeller!
4. Monkey Man (feat. Kylie Minogue)
5. Rock-A-Bye Your Bear
6. Toot Toot, Chugga Chugga, Big Red Car
7. Twinkle, Twinkle Little Star
8. You Make Me Feel Like Dancing (featuring Leo Sayer)
9. Wake Up Jeff!
10. Captain Feathersword Fell Asleep On His Pirate Ship (Quack Quack)
11. Ready, Steady, Wiggle!
12. Getting Strong!
13. Wiggle Bay
14. The Monkey Dance
15. Everybody, I Have a Question
16. Get Ready To Wiggle
17. The Shimmie Shake
18. Go Santa Go
19. Dorothy (Would You Like To Dance With Me?)
20. Ooey, Ooey, Ooey Allergies!
21. Ooh It's Captain Feathersword
22. Dressing Up
23. Murray Had A Turtle
24. Michael Finnegan
25. Move Your Arms Like Henry (featuring Paul Hester on Drums)
26. Lights, Camera, Action, Wiggles!
27. I'm Dorothy the Dinosaur!
28. Simon Says
29. Do The Owl (featuring Steve Irwin)
30. Play Your Guitar With Murray
31. I've Got My Glasses On!
32. Hot Poppin Popcorn (featuring Jamie Redfern)
33. Rockin' Santa (Featuring John Fogerty)
34. Here Come the Chicken (featuring James Burton on Guitar)
35. Say the Dance, Do the Dance

=== Cast ===
==== The Wiggles ====
- Anthony Field
- Emma Watkins
- Lachlan Gillespie
- Simon Pryce
- Murray Cook
- Jeff Fatt
- Greg Page
- Sam Moran

== Certifications ==
Certifications for Hot Potatoes! The Best of the Wiggles
Region	Certification	Certified units/sales
Australia (ARIA)	Platinum	70,000^{‡}
^{‡} Sales+streaming figures based on certification alone.
