= Wiggle and Learn =

2007 TV Series by the Wiggles

- Genre: Children's series; Educational
- Directed by: Paul Field
- Starring: Sam Moran; Anthony Field; Murray Cook; Jeff Fatt
- Opening theme: "Wiggle and Learn"
- Ending theme: "Goodbye from the Wiggles"
- Composers: Murray Cook, Jeff Fatt, Anthony Field, Greg Page, John Field and Dominic Lindsay
- Country of origin: Australia
- Original language: English
- No. of episodes: 26 (22-minute versions); 52 (11-minute versions)

Production
- Executive producer: The Wiggles
- Producer: Paul Field
- Production location: Hot Potato Studios
- Cinematography: Borce Damcevski
- Editors: Liam Donaghy, David Roberts and George Barillaro
- Running time: 22 minutes; 11 minutes

Original release
- Network: ABC1 (Australia)
- Release: 12 May – 27 August 2008

Related
- The Wiggles Show!; Ready, Steady, Wiggle!

Wiggle and Learn is an Australian TV show that aired on the ABC. It ran from 12 May 2007 to 10 February 2010. It is The Wiggles 6th TV series. It was the first TV series to not feature Greg Page, who had to depart the group in 2006 due to poor health, and the only one to feature Sam Moran as the Yellow Wiggle, as well as the last Wiggles show until Ready, Steady, Wiggle! in 2013. It was also the final series with Murray Cook and Jeff Fatt as the red and purple Wiggles respectively.

Unlike the Wiggles' five previous TV series, Wiggle and Learn uses Nursery Rhymes in addition to self-written songs.

== Supporting cast ==
- Paul Paddick as Captain Feathersword
- Emily McGlinn as Dorothy the Dinosaur
  - Voiced by Carolyn Ferrie
- Adrian Quinnell, Kristy Talbot, and Ben Murray as Wags the Dog
  - Voiced by Mic Conway
- Mario Martinez-Diaz and Rebecca Knox as Henry the Octopus
  - Voiced by Paul Paddick

== Production ==
=== Development ===
The Wiggles first pitched the idea in early 2006 and wanted to have Greg Page in it. Page helped write all the songs for a related video and album called Getting Strong!. After filming three episodes, Page was diagnosed with Dysautonomia and was unable to participate and the episodes were eventually re-shot with Moran. In 2015, Anthony Field, Murray Cook, and Jeff Fatt found the original footage while lurking around on the computer. The original footage of the sets was also used for their very first documentary 15 Years of Wiggly Fun.

== Episodes ==
No. in series	Title	Original release date
1	"Move and Groove"	13 December 2009 (USA)
2	"Musical Landscape"	10 December 2009 (USA)
3	"Wiggle Dance"	17 December 2009 (USA)
4	"The King of Swing"	9 December 2009 (USA)
5	"Bailar y Cantar"	21 December 2009 (USA)
6	"Barnyard Boogie"	11 December 2009 (USA)
7	"The Bobby Bounce"	28 December 2009 (USA)
8	"The Black Velvet Band"	19 December 2009 (USA)
9	"Fun in the Sun"	12 December 2009 (USA)
10	"My Fair Lady!"	14 December 2009 (USA)
11	"So Early in the Morning"	15 December 2009 (USA)
12	"Soy Capitan!"	16 December 2009 (USA)
13	"Together We Live So Happily"	18 December 2009 (USA)
14	"Oh, Captain!"	23 December 2009 (USA)
15	"The Biggest Smile of All"	29 December 2009 (USA)
16	"The Queen of the Land"	25 December 2009 (USA)
17	"Get the Rhythm of the Hips"	26 December 2009 (USA)
18	"Hear the Drumbeat"	22 December 2009 (USA)
19	"Teddy Bear Touch the Ground"	22 January 2010 (USA)
20	"Meadowsweet and Lady Smocks"	8 January 2010 (USA)
21	"Ding, Ding, Dong!"	6 January 2010 (USA)
22	"Buzz, Buzz, Buzz"	13 January 2010 (USA)
23	"Shall We Dance?"	20 January 2010 (USA)
24	"Dance This Way"	27 January 2010 (USA)
25	"Kittens and Mittens"	3 February 2010 (USA)
26	"Surf, Sand and Sun"	10 February 2010 (USA)

=== 11-minute versions ===
No. in series	Title	Original release date
1	"We Feel Like Dancing!"	12 May 2007
2	"The Shimmie Shake"	13 May 2007
3	"Let's Get the Rhythm"	14 May 2007
4	"Over in the Meadow"	15 May 2007
5	"I Spy"	16 May 2007
6	"Keep Moving!"	19 May 2007
7	"Who Am I?"	20 May 2007
8	"Murray Had a Turtle"	21 May 2007
9	"La Bamba"	22 May 2007
10	"Oranges and Lemons"	23 May 2007
11	"Hey Diddle Diddle"	26 May 2007
12	"This Way and That Way"	27 May 2007
13	"Jeff Gets a Letter"	28 May 2007
14	"This Old Man"	29 May 2007
15	"A Sailor Went to Sea"	30 May 2007
16	"Her Eyes Shone Like Diamonds"	2 June 2007
17	"Beach, Beach, Sandy Beach"	3 June 2007
18	"Old Dan Tucker"	4 June 2007
19	"London Bridge"	5 June 2007
20	"There Was a Princess"	6 June 2007
21	"The Banana Boat"	9 June 2007
22	"Incy Wincy Spider"	10 June 2007
23	"Fairy Dancing!"	11 June 2007
24	"Getting Strong"	12 June 2007
25	"Pussycat, Pussycat"	13 January 2008
26	"Fun at Wigglehouse"	16 January 2008
27	"Hello!"	23 February 2008
28	"The Five Senses"	24 January 2008
29	"Big, Bigger, Biggest!"	25 February 2008
30	"See-Saw"	28 February 2008
31	"Musical Landscape"	29 February 2008
32	"D is for Dorothy"	February 2008
33	"The Sporting Salsa!"	February 2008
34	"Jack and Jill"	6 August 2008
35	"Wags House"	4 August 2008
36	"Two Fine Gentlemen"	5 August 2008
37	"Teddy Bear, Teddy Bear"	6 August 2008
38	"Wiggletastic"	7 August 2008
39	"English Country Garden"	8 August 2008
40	"Circus Fun"	11 August 2008
41	"Frère Jacques"	12 August 2008
42	"The Turkey in the Straw"	13 August 2008
43	"Twinkle Twinkle"	14 August 2008
44	"Sam Gets a Letter"	15 August 2008
45	"I'm a Cowboy"	18 August 2008
46	"Smell Your Way Through the Day"	19 August 2008
47	"The Horn Pipe"	20 August 2008
48	"Miss Polly Had a Dolly"	21 August 2009
49	"Allo, Allo, Allo!"	22 August 2009
50	"Three Little Kittens"	25 August 2009
51	"Nick Nack Paddy Wack"	26 August 2009
52	"I Drive the Big Red Car"	27 August 2009

=== Writing ===
The original draft consists of three plots:

- The Wiggles and Dorothy the Dinosaur plan to go on a picnic.
- The Wiggles play soccer on the beach.
- The Wiggles must save their friends by singing songs.

== Broadcast ==
The Australian version aired from 2007 to 2008 on ABC and Playhouse Disney. Then the Canadian version premiered April 2008 on Treehouse TV and the US version aired December 2008 at 7/6c am on Playhouse Disney. It also re-ran on that block in January 2009 running at 11am weekdays, 7am weekends, and would continue to do so up until May of that year.

It is also the first Wiggles TV show to be completely dubbed in another language (In other countries such as Italy, earlier Wiggles TV shows had the dialogue dubbed but the songs remained in English). It aired in Spanish as "Wiggle y Aprende" on Playhouse Disney in Latin America and later Disney Junior, and on Disney Junior in Brazil as "Wiggle e Aprenda".

The show remained in reruns in some countries, most notably Australia and Latin America, until 2013 or 2014, despite Moran being fired from the Wiggles in 2012 due to Page's return, and Cook and Fatt leaving the group in 2013.

== DVD releases ==
DVD title	Region 1	Discs	Episodes	Extras
Wiggle and Learn: Vol 1	August 22, 2007	2	1-12	Behind the scenes; Special Extras; Pilot & 2nd episode of The Wiggles Show
Wiggle and Learn: Vol 2	September 1, 2011	1	13-19	Bonus Episode; Photo gallery
