= Wiggle Time =

1993 film by Phil Cullen

- VHS cover
- Directed by: Phil Cullen
- Written by: The Wiggles
- Produced by: John Spence
- Starring: Greg Page; Anthony Field; Murray Cook; Jeff Fatt
- Music by: The Wiggles
- Distributed by: Roadshow/ABC Video (#13536)
- Release date: September 1993
- Running time: 32 minutes
- Country: Australia

Wiggle Time is the first home video from The Wiggles. It was released in 1993. It contains songs from the albums The Wiggles, Here Comes a Song and Stories and Songs: The Adventures of Captain Feathersword the Friendly Pirate. It also contains two songs newly recorded ("Fruit Salad" and "Marching Along"). The Wiggles and their friends Dorothy the Dinosaur, Henry the Octopus and Captain Feathersword all made their debuts (Wags the Dog wasn't created at the time).

== Songs and skits ==
1. "Get Ready to Wiggle"
2. "Here Comes a Bear"
3. "Captain Feathersword"
4. "Uncle Noah's Ark"
5. "I Love It When It Rains"
6. "Dorothy the Dinosaur"
7. Sing a Song of Polly/Greg's Magic Trick
8. "Whenever I Hear This Music"
9. "Henry the Octopus"
10. "Rock-a-Bye Your Bear"
11. "Fruit Salad"
12. "Marching Along"
13. "Dorothy's Birthday Party"

== Plot ==
Opening - The Wiggles wave their hands up high from the song "Whenever I Hear This Music".

Jeff has fallen asleep while standing and then Anthony, Greg and Murray arrive. Murray suggests they wake him up, and Greg has everyone yell "Wake Up Jeff!" at the count of 3. They count: "1, 2, 3, Wake Up, Jeff!" Jeff jumps and screams, running around to the back of the set and then to the front. Anthony asks Jeff if he's awake now and he affirms. Now it's time to Wiggle!

- Song: "Get Ready To Wiggle"

Greg tells everyone that there going to sing a song all about four animals. At the end of the song, he says that let's all growl like a scary bear.

- Song: "Here Comes A Bear"

While Jeff, Greg and Murray are growling at the end of the song, Captain Feathersword arrives and tickles them with the feathersword. Greg tells Captain Feathersword to stop tickling him, and Captain Feathersword agrees, stating he can show them a pirate dance they can learn.

- Song: "Captain Feathersword"

Murray introduces the next song about a man who lived a long, long, time ago. His name was Noah and he had to save some animals from a flood so he built a really, really big boat and called it an ark. As Murray lists off the animals, the other Wiggles make animal sounds.

- Song: "Uncle Noah's Ark"

Jeff and some kids are doing paintings using droppers. He holds out his dropper and remarks that it looks like rain.

- Song: "I Love When It Rains"

Anthony talks about Dorothy the Dinosaur. He does not know where she is. When Dorothy arrives, Anthony still does not know but is directed by the audience to look over at a certain direction. But when he looks, Dorothy has moved. After a few misses, Dorothy walks up behind Jeff. Greg tells Jeff that Dorothy is behind him. Jeff looks to his left but Dorothy moves behind him and out of sight. After some more misses, Jeff looks and sees Dorothy in surprise. They all sing the next song.

- Song: "Dorothy The Dinosaur"
- Skit: Greg's Magic Trick

Greg does a magic trick where he flips through a book that initially does not have any pictures. He asks the audience to say some magic words and throw some pictures into the book. He flips through the book and it now has some drawings. He then asks the audience to throw some colour into the book, but the trick does not work. He remembers to say the magic word "Abracadabra". and then it works.

- Song: "Whenever I Hear This Music"

Jeff talks about the next song.

- Song: "Henry The Octopus"

The Wiggles are sitting on the floor with some kids who are holding teddy bears. They are having a picnic. Greg says that he knows a song about teddy bears, and he asks if everyone can sing and do the actions with them.

- Song: "Rock A Bye Your Bear"

The Wiggles and some kids are seated at a table, making fruit salad. Anthony explains how it's done and to make sure there is an adult present, and to use a plastic knife.

- Song: "Fruit Salad"

Anthony leads The Wiggles and some kids in a line. The kids are holding presents. He stops and tells everyone they are going to Dorothy the Dinosaur's birthday party and that you can come along. Then they continue marching around singing and then walk off the set.

- Song: "Marching Along"
- Song: "Dorothy's Birthday Party"

Greg remarks what a great party it was, but now they're tired so it's time to go. They all say goodbye and fell asleep except for Jeff, who tries to wake everyone up but they don't wake up. Jeff then crosses his arms and shakes his head with a sigh.

== Cast ==
The Wiggles are:

- Jeff Fatt
- Greg Page
- Murray Cook
- Anthony Field

The dance segments were choreographed by Jacqueline Fallon, and performed by Jacqueline Fallon and Mary Anne Rose Hull.

== Release ==
The video was released in Australia on 20 September 1993. On 5 April 2018 the video was uploaded on The Wiggles' YouTube channel as part of the Classic Wiggles playlist, but split into three parts.

== 1998 video ==
Wiggle Time (re-recording)
- Directed by: Chisholm McTavish
- Written by: The Wiggles
- Produced by: Nick Pike
- Starring: Greg Page; Anthony Field; Murray Cook; Jeff Fatt
- Music by: The Wiggles
- Distributed by: Roadshow Entertainment
- Release date: 13 April 1998
- Running time: 40 minutes
- Country: Australia

The Wiggles video Wiggle Time was re-recorded and released in 1998. The songs and skits are updated from the 1993 version, except for "Fruit Salad", which was included in the re-recording of Yummy Yummy instead. The closing skit where Jeff tries to wake the other Wiggles up does not appear on the 1998 version. Songs were added to the video, including "Ponies", "Quack Quack", and three bonus songs from one of their concerts.

=== Songs and skits ===
The video had the following songs and major skits.

1. "Get Ready to Wiggle"
2. "Here Comes a Bear"
3. "Captain Feathersword"
4. "Uncle Noah's Ark"
5. "Ponies"
6. "Dorothy the Dinosaur"
7. "Whenever I Hear This Music"
8. "Henry the Octopus"
9. "Rock-a-Bye Your Bear"

Skit: Greg's Magic Show

10. "I Love It When It Rains"
11. "Quack Quack"
12. "Marching Along"
13. "Dorothy's Birthday Party"

Live from the Wiggly Concert

14. "Wave to Wags"
15. "Five Little Ducks"
16. "Wiggly Medley"
17. Henry's Dance (Instrumental)

=== Cast ===
The Wiggles are:

- Murray Cook
- Jeff Fatt
- Anthony Field
- Greg Page

Additional cast members include:

- Leeanne Ashley as Dorothy the Dinosaur
- Paul Paddick as Captain Feathersword
- Edward Rooke as Wags the Dog
- Leanne and Donna Halloran as Henry the Octopus

The choreography was done by Leanne Halloran. Anthony's brother Paul plays a dog catcher.

=== Production ===
Because the video was released after The Wiggles Movie, The Wiggles' costumes had been updated to feature logos on their shirts. Anthony now consistently wears a blue shirt, Paul Paddick plays Captain Feathersword (though in the song "Captain Feathersword", he lip syncs to the original vocal track by Anthony Field), and Wags the Dog is a regular character.

=== Release ===
The Wiggles released both Wiggle Time and Yummy Yummy in 1998. Wiggle Time was released on video in the United States in October 1999. In 2002, The Wiggles released Yummy Yummy and Wiggle Time as a combined DVD.

In February–March 2019, the video was uploaded to the Wiggles' YouTube channel in multiple parts.

== 2000 album ==
Wiggle Time

Studio album by The Wiggles
- Released: 12 October 1999 (USA); 30 August 2000 (Australia)
- Genre: Children's music
- Length: 42:00 (Australian release)
- Labels: ABC, Lyrick Studios
- Producer: The Wiggles

The Wiggles chronology
It's a Wiggly Wiggly World (2000)	Wiggle Time (1999)	Yule Be Wiggling (2000)

Wiggle Time is the eleventh Wiggles album, released in 2000 by ABC Music distributed by EMI. In the US, it is the group's debut release under the title "Let's Wiggle".

=== Track list ===
==== US and OG Wiggles streaming version track list ====
All tracks are written by (or trad. arr by) Murray Cook, Jeff Fatt, Anthony Field, Greg Page except spoken and noted below.

No.	Title	Writer(s)	Length
1.	"Get Ready to Wiggle"	Cook, Fatt, Field, Page, John Field	2:03
2.	"Rock-a-Bye Your Bear"		1:24
3.	"Dorothy the Dinosaur"	Cook, Fatt, Field, Page, John Field	2:13
4.	"We're All Friends"		1:51
5.	"Little Brown Ant"		1:03
6.	"Uncle Noah's Ark"		2:25
7.	"Dorothy's Birthday Party"		1:57
8.	"Here Comes a Bear"		1:22
9.	"Henry the Octopus"		1:26
10.	"Silver Bells That Ring in the Night"		2:11
11.	"Poseje Mauw"		0:59
12.	"I Love It When It Rains"		1:10
13.	"Sing a Song of Polly"		1:06
14.	"Bound for South Australia"		1:19
15.	"The Gypsy Rover"		2:10
16.	"I Look In the Mirror"		1:42
17.	"Lechoo Yeladim"		1:32
18.	"Dancing Ride"		2:02
19.	"Whenever I Hear This Music"		1:07
20.	"Fly Through the Air"		1:12
21.	"The Dreaming Song"	Cook, Fatt, Field, Page, John Field	1:39
22.	"The Lion and the Unicorn"		1:46

==== AUS track list ====
All tracks are written by (or trad. arr by) Murray Cook, Jeff Fatt, Anthony Field, Greg Page except spoken and noted below.

No.	Title	Writer(s)	Length
1.	"Get Ready to Wiggle"	Cook, Fatt, Field, Page, John Field	2:07
2.	"Rock-a-Bye Your Bear"		1:25
3.	"Dorothy the Dinosaur"	Cook, Fatt, Field, Page, John Field	2:15
4.	"Here Comes a Bear"		1:25
5.	"We're All Friends"		1:52
6.	"Little Brown Ant"		1:06
7.	"I Knew a Cricket" (spoken)		0:16
8.	"Uncle Noah's Ark"		2:27
9.	"Henry the Octopus"		1:43
10.	"The Gypsy Rover"		2:13
11.	"A Pirate's Life" (spoken)		0:22
12.	"Bound for South Australia"		1:21
13.	"The Magic Kindy"		1:30
14.	"Poesje Mauw"		1:02
15.	"I Love It When It Rains"		1:11
16.	"Lechoo Yeladim"		1:34
17.	"Whenever I Hear This Music"		1:13
18.	"Bert the Wombat"		0:12
19.	"Dancing Ride"		2:04
20.	"Dorothy's Birthday Party"		2:28
21.	"I Look in the Mirror"		1:44
22.	"Daniel and Molly"		2:07
23.	"A Family Song"		2:06
24.	"Fly Through the Air"		1:14
25.	"The Dreaming Song"	Cook, Fatt, Field, Page, John Field	1:40
26.	"The Lion and the Unicorn"		1:48
27.	"Mitten the Kitten"		0:59
