= Fire engine (disambiguation) =

A fire engine is a road vehicle designed for firefighting.

Fire engine may also refer to:

- An early form of steam engine
- The Fire Engines, a Scottish post-punk group
- Fully Integrated Robotised Engine, a series of car engines by Fiat
- "Fire Engine", a Railway Series story from the 1984 book James and the Diesel Engines
- "Fire Engines", a song from The Wiggles' album Here Comes a Song

== See also ==
- Fire engine red, a shade of red colour
