= Tidyup =

Tidyup may refer to:

- "Tidyup", a fictional character in the British television series Stoppit and Tidyup
- "Tidy Up Song", a song by The Wiggles from their 1992 album Here Comes a Song
