= The Wiggles Movie Soundtrack =

Soundtrack album by the Wiggles
- Released: October 1997
- Recorded: 1997
- Genre: Children's music
- Length: 42:19
- Label: ABC
- Producer: The Wiggles

The Wiggles chronology
Wiggly, Wiggly Christmas (1996)	The Wiggles Movie Soundtrack (1997)	Toot Toot! (1998)

The Wiggles Movie Soundtrack is the eighth Wiggles album. It was released in 1997 and serves as the companion soundtrack for The Wiggles Movie.

== Release ==
The Wiggles Movie Soundtrack was released in October 1997. According to ABC label manager Rex Barry, its "24th track" contains "interactive multimedia is designed specifically to educate the under-six-year-olds by simplifying the navigation and encouraging and rewarding exploration of the disc. The package features full-screen, full-motion, real-time video action footage from the film, the Wiggles themselves talking about the movie, illustrations that can be printed out for colouring in, plus a game, 'kiddie safe' Internet links and general Wiggles information".

== Track listing ==
All tracks are written by M.Cook, J.Fatt, A.Field, G.Page except noted below.

No.	Title	Writer(s)	Length
1.	"Hey There, Wally!"		1:45
2.	"Dorothy (Would You Like to Dance?)"		1:38
3.	"Can You Point Your Fingers and Do the Twist?"		1:35
4.	"Rock-a-Bye Your Bear"		1:25
5.	"We Like to Say Hello" (instrumental)		0:34
6.	"Quack Quack"		1:56
7.	"Rockin' and a Rollin' Sea"		1:57
8.	"Boom Boom"	J.Field	1:45
9.	"Mrs. Bingles Theme"	J.Field	1:37
10.	"Tap Wags"	J.Field	1:16
11.	"Ballerina, Ballerina"	J.Field	1:29
12.	"Ooh It's Captain Feathersword"	J.Field	2:38
13.	"Hot Potato (The Young Wiggles)"	J.Field, M.Cook, J.Fatt, A.Field, G.Page	1:18
14.	"Romp Bomp a Stomp"		1:25
15.	"I'm a Cow"		0:30
16.	"Nya Nya Nya"		1:46
17.	"Wally's Dream Music"		1:13
18.	"Magic Club Music"		1:37
19.	"Hey There Wally" (instrumental)		2:20
20.	"Let's Have a Party" (instrumental)		2:35
21.	"Let's Have a Party"		2:35
22.	"Wiggly Medley (Note: The Wiggly Medley includes the following songs: "Dorothy (Would You Like to Dance?)", "Fruit Salad", "Hot Potato", "Can You (Point Your Fingers and Do the Twist?)", "It's a Pirate Party on the Good Ship Feathersword", "Rock-a-Bye Your Bear" and "Quack Quack")"		3:15
23.	"Wigglemix"		3:32
Total length:			42:19

== Personnel ==
- Greg Page – vocals
- Paul Paddick – backing vocals
- Greg Truman – backing vocals
- Carolyn Ferrie – backing vocals
- Kevin Bennett – backing vocals
- Anthony Field – guitar
- Murray Cook – guitar, bass
- Terry Murray – guitar
- David Anthony – piano on "Wally's Dream Music"
- Jeff Fatt – keyboards
- Maria Schattovits – violin
- Angela Lindsay – viola
- Margaret Lindsay – cello
- Dominic Lindsay – trumpet
- Anita Thomas – saxophones and clarinet
- Tony Henry – drums
- Peter Iacono – drums

== Charts ==
Chart performance for The Wiggles Movie Soundtrack
Chart (1997)	Peak position
Australian Albums (ARIA)	36

== Certifications ==
Certifications for The Wiggles Movie Soundtrack
Region	Certification	Certified units/sales
Australia (ARIA)	Platinum	70,000^{^}
^{^} Shipments figures based on certification alone.
