= Bang Shang a Lang =

Australian pub rock band

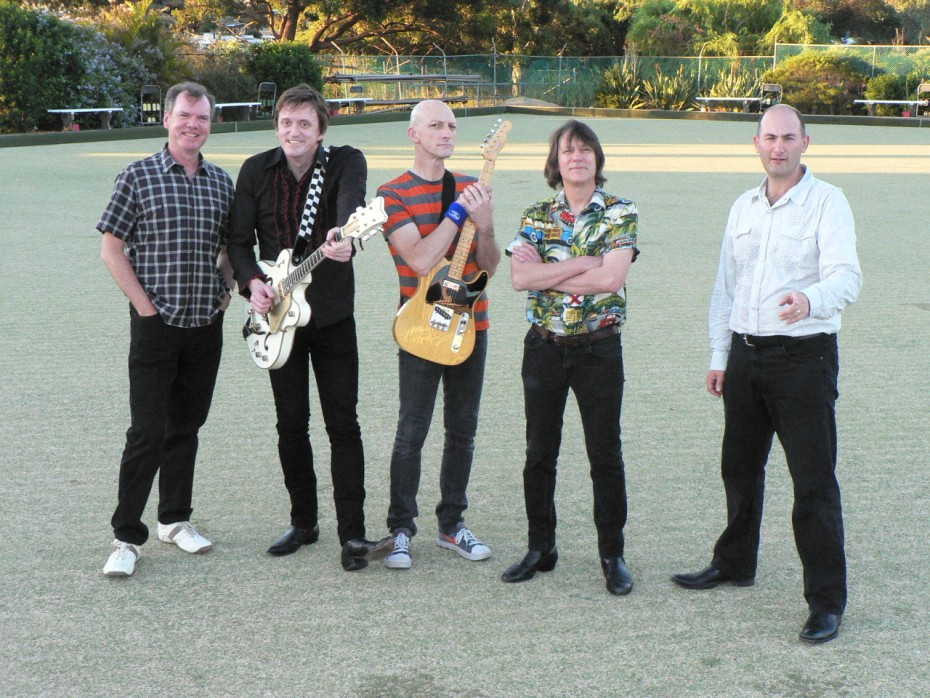

Background information
- Also known as: BSL
- Origin: Sydney, New South Wales, Australia
- Genre: Australian pub rock
- Spinoff of: Finger Guns; the Transistors
- Members: Clyde Bramley; Bruce Carter; Murray Cook; Mark Mulligan
- Past members: Richard Stevens; Mark Alchin
- Website: bangshangalang.com

Bang Shang a Lang (BSL) are an Australian pub rock band. Four members were in other bands in the local music scene from the late 1970s through to the 1990s. Murray Cook on guitar and vocals and Mark Mulligan on guitar and lead vocals were previously members of Finger Guns in 1986, which issued a single, "Heartman Is Breathing", in that year. Bruce Carter, on drums, and Cook were both members of the Transistors. Keyboard player, Richard Stevens, hails from Leeds, England. Clyde Bramley, their bass guitarist, was a member of the Hitmen (1978), the New Christs (1980–81), the Angie Pepper Band (ca. 1982) and Hoodoo Gurus (1982–88).

Cook co-founded a children's music group, the Wiggles, in 1991. After the Wiggles formed, Cook would periodically play with Bang Shang a Lang when available. In mid-2000 Mark Alchin joined the group on bass guitar (ex-the Clones, the Reasons Why). BSL released a CD, Unreal, Orange Peel!, in 2006. Of its eleven tracks, four are originals written by Mulligan and seven are cover versions. By 2012 the line-up of Bang Shang a Lang was Bramley, Carter, Cook and Mulligan.

== Personnel ==
- Clyde Bramley – bass guitar, vocals
- Bruce Carter – drums, vocals
- Murray Cook – guitar, vocals
- Mark Mulligan – guitar, lead vocals
- Richard Stevens – keyboards, vocals
- Mark Alchin – bass guitar
