= Hoop Dee Doo: It's a Wiggly Party =

2001 studio album/video by The Wiggles

- US cover

Studio album by the Wiggles
- Released: 30 April 2001
- Studios: Albert Studios, Sydney Australia; APC Studios
- Genre: Children's music
- Label: ABC Music
- Producer: The Wiggles

The Wiggles chronology
Yule Be Wiggling (2000)	Hoop Dee Doo: It's a Wiggly Party (2001)	Wiggly Safari (2002)

Hoop Dee Doo: It's a Wiggly Party is the thirteenth Wiggles album. It was released in 2001 by ABC Music distributed by EMI. It was nominated for the 2001 ARIA Music Award for Best Children's Album but lost to Hi-5's It's a Party. A video of the same title was released in 2001.

== Track listing ==
All tracks are written by (or trad arr. by) Murray Cook, Jeff Fatt, Anthony Field, Greg Page, except listed below.

No.	Title	Writer(s)	Length
1.	"Wiggly Party (intro)" (spoken)		0:08
2.	"Wiggly Party"	Murray Cook, Jeff Fatt, Anthony Field, Greg Page, Craig Abercrombie, John Field	2:00
3.	"Hoop-Dee-Doo (intro)" (spoken)		0:10
4.	"Hoop-Dee-Doo"	F. Loesser, M. Delugg	2:55
5.	"Little Children"	Brian Wilson	1:44
6.	"Move Like an Emu (intro)" (spoken)		0:19
7.	"Move Like an Emu"	Cook, Fatt, Field, Page, John Field	2:03
8.	"La Cucaracha (intro)" (spoken)		1:03
9.	"La Cucaracha"	Trad. Arr. Cook, Fatt, Field, Page, Fernando Moguel Sr.	2:02
10.	"Captain's Magic Buttons"		2:18
11.	"Dance the Ooby-Doo (with Dorothy the Dinosaur)"		1:35
12.	"Play Your Guitar with Murray"		1:49
13.	"Marie's Wedding (intro)" (spoken)		0:15
14.	"Marie's Wedding"		2:13
15.	"Zoological Gardens (intro)" (spoken)		1:03
16.	"Zoological Gardens"	Trad. Arr. Cook, Fatt, Field, Page, Morgan Crowley	1:51
17.	"Swim Henry Swim"		1:45
18.	"Wiggle Hula"	Cook, Fatt, Field, Page, Dominic Lindsay	2:13
19.	"Fun on the Farm (intro)" (spoken)		0:09
20.	"Fun on the Farm"	Cook, Fatt, Field, Page, John Field	1:33
21.	"Let's Spend a Day at the Beach (intro)" (spoken)		0:10
22.	"Let's Spend a Day at the Beach"	Cook, Fatt, Field, Page, John Field	2:01
23.	"Caveland"	Cook, Fatt, Field, Page, John Field	2:45
24.	"Run Around Run Run"	Morgan Crowley	2:13
25.	"The Wobbly Dance"		1:32

== Charts ==
Chart performance for Hoop Dee Doo: It's a Wiggly Party
Chart (2001)	Peak position
Australian Albums (ARIA)	100

== Certifications ==
Certifications for Hoop Dee Doo: It's a Wiggly Party
Region	Certification	Certified units/sales
Australia (ARIA)	Gold	35,000^{^}
^{^} Shipments figures based on certification alone.

== Video ==
Hoop Dee Doo: It's a Wiggly Party
- Directed by: Chisholm McTavish
- Produced by: Paul Field
- Starring: Greg Page; Anthony Field; Murray Cook; Jeff Fatt
- Distributed by: Roadshow/ABC Video #103114
- Release date: 19 June 2001
- Running time: 52 minutes
- Country: Australia

The video "Hoop-Dee-Doo: It's a Wiggly Party" was also released in 2001.

=== Song list ===
1. "Wiggly Party"
2. "Hoop-Dee-Doo"
3. "Little Children"
4. "Move Like an Emu"
5. "La Cucaracha"
6. "Captain's Magic Buttons"
7. "Dance the Ooby-Doo (with Dorothy the Dinosaur)"
8. "Play Your Guitar with Murray"
9. "Marie's Wedding"
10. "Zoological Gardens"
11. "Swim Henry Swim"
12. "Fun on the Farm"
13. "Caveland"
14. "Run Around Run Run"
15. "The Wobbly Dance"
16. "Wiggle Hula"

=== Cast ===
The Wiggles are

- Murray Cook
- Jeff Fatt
- Anthony Field
- Greg Page

Additional cast

- Paul Paddick as Captain Feathersword
- Corrine O'Rafferty as Dorothy the Dinosaur
- Reem Hanwell as Henry the Octopus
- Andrew McCourt as Wags the Dog

=== Releases ===
- Australia: 19 June 2001
- America: 9 April 2002
- United Kingdom: 12 September 2005
