= Yule Be Wiggling =

2000 studio album / 2001 video by The Wiggles

- Digital cover

Studio album by the Wiggles
- Released: 2000
- Studios: Electric Avenue Studios, Sydney, Australia; Windmill Lane Studios, Dublin, Eire
- Genre: Children's music
- Labels: ABC (AUS); Hit Entertainment (US); Koch Records (US)
- Producer: The Wiggles

The Wiggles chronology
Wiggle Time (2000)	Yule Be Wiggling (2000)	Hoop Dee Doo: It's a Wiggly Party (2001)

Yule Be Wiggling is the twelfth Wiggles album (and second Christmas album) released in 2000 by ABC Music and distributed by EMI.

== Track list ==
All tracks are written by Murray Cook, Jeff Fatt, Anthony Field, Greg Page and John Field, except listed below.

No.	Title	Writer(s)	Length
1.	"Yule Be Wiggling (Intro)" (spoken (Note: On some versions such as the Koch release in 2006, this song was not counted towards the overall number of tracks.))		0:12
2.	"Just Can't Wait For Christmas Day"		2:43
3.	"Here Come The Reindeer (Intro)" (spoken)		0:09
4.	"Here Come The Reindeer"		1:44
5.	"And The World Is One On A Christmas Morning (Intro)" (spoken)		0:16
6.	"And The World Is One On A Christmas Morning"		2:12
7.	"Murray's Christmas Samba (Intro)" (spoken)		0:31
8.	"Murray's Christmas Samba"	Cook, Fatt, Field, Page, Dominic Lindsay, Margaret Lindsay	1:31
9.	"Jimmy The Elf"	Cook, Fatt, Field, Page	1:21
10.	"The Little Drummer Boy"	Katherine Kennicott Davis, Henry V. Onarti, Harry Simeone	2:46
11.	"Christmas Around The World (Intro)" (spoken)		0:07
12.	"Christmas Around The World"		2:23
13.	"Wags Loves To Shake Shake (Intro)" (spoken)		0:08
14.	"Wags Loves To Shake Shake"		2:11
15.	"Doing A Dance"	Cook, Fatt, Field, Page	1:35
16.	"Curoo Curoo (Intro)" (spoken)		1:38
17.	"Curoo Curoo"	Trad. Arr. Cook, Fatt, Field, Page, Dominic Lindsay, Morgan Crowley, Denise O'Kane	3:01
18.	"Christmas Polka"	Cook, Fatt, Field, Page, Dominic Lindsay	2:08
19.	"Decorate The Tree"	Cook, Fatt, Field, Page, Paul Paddick	2:50
20.	"Yule Be Wiggling"	Cook, Fatt, Field, Page	1:28
21.	"Greg's Christmas Poem" (spoken word)		0:07
22.	"A Scottish Christmas"	Dominic Lindsay	1:44
23.	"Angels We Have Heard On High"	Trad. Arr. Cook, Fatt, Field, Page	2:10
24.	"Jeff's Snooze Poem" (spoken word)		0:10
25.	"The First Noel"	Trad. Arr. Cook, Fatt, Field, Page	2:48
26.	"The Wiggles Christmas Wish" (spoken word)		0:16

== Personnel ==
The Wiggles

- Greg Page – lead vocals
- Murray Cook – guitar, bass, background vocals
- Anthony Field – guitar, background vocals
- Jeff Fatt – background vocals

Additional personnel

- Morgan Crowley, Denise O'Kane – vocals
- John Field, Terry Murray – guitar
- Dominic Lindsay – trumpet
- Maria Schattovits – violin
- Margaret Linsday – cello
- Tony Henry – drums
- Phil South – percussion
- Mark Punch – background vocals

== Gallery ==
US cover

== Charts ==
Chart performance for Yule Be Wiggling
Chart (2000)	Peak position
Australian Albums (ARIA)	55

== Certifications ==
Certifications for Yule Be Wiggling
Region	Certification	Certified units/sales
Australia (ARIA)	Gold	35,000^{^}
^{^} Shipments figures based on certification alone.

== Video ==
Yule Be Wiggling
- Directed by: Chisholm McTavish
- Produced by: Paul Field
- Starring: Greg Page; Anthony Field; Murray Cook; Jeff Fatt
- Edited by: Steve Rees; Douglas Kirk; Chisholm McTavish
- Music by: The Wiggles
- Distributed by: Roadshow/ABC Video ( #102923)
- Release date: October 2001
- Running time: 45 minutes
- Country: Australia

Yule Be Wiggling is the second Wiggles Christmas video, released in October 2001.

=== Songs ===
1. Doing a Dance
2. Just Can't Wait for Christmas Day
3. Here Come the Reindeer
4. And the World is One on a Christmas Morning
5. Murray's Christmas Samba
6. Jimmy the Elf
7. Curoo Curoo (The Carol of the Birds)
8. Christmas Around the World
9. Wags Loves to Shake Shake
10. Jingle Bells
11. Angels We Have Heard on High
12. Christmas Polka
13. Decorate the Tree
14. A Scottish Christmas
15. Come on Everybody (We'll Tap for You)
16. Yule Be Wiggling

=== Cast ===
The cast as presented on the videos:

The Wiggles are
- Murray Cook
- Jeff Fatt
- Anthony Field
- Greg Page

Additional Cast
- Captain Feathersword: Paul Paddick
- Dorothy the Dinosaur: Carolyn Ferrie
- Henry the Octopus: Jeff Fatt
- Wags the Dog: Jeff Fatt
- Santa Claus
