= Getting Strong! =

2007 studio album by The Wiggles

Studio album by the Wiggles
- Released: 16 May 2007
- Recorded: 2006–2007
- Studio: Hot Potato Studios
- Genre: Children's music
- Label: ABC
- Producer: Anthony Field

The Wiggles chronology
Christmas Classics (2006)	Getting Strong! (2007)	Pop Go the Wiggles! (2007)

Getting Strong! (the CD label has the subtitle of Wiggle and Learn) is the 26th studio album by Australian children's music group, the Wiggles. It is the Wiggles' first studio album featuring Sam Moran. It was released on 16 May 2007 by ABC, and distributed by Roadshow Entertainment.

== Track list ==
=== Health and Physical Development ===
All tracks are written by Murray Cook, Jeff Fatt, Anthony Field, Greg Page, John Field and Dominic Lindsay, except listed below.

No.	Title	Writer(s)	Length
1.	"Wiggle and Learn"
2.	"Hello, We're the Wiggles"
3.	"To Have a Tea Party"
4.	"Let's Take Turns Skipping Rope"
5.	"Follow the Leader"
6.	"Swinging on a Swing"
7.	"When the Music Stops, Everybody Hop"
8.	"When the Music Stops, Everybody Skip"
9.	"When the Music Stops, Everybody Jump"
10.	"The Five Senses"
11.	"Fingers Standing Very Tall"
12.	"Hands on Your Ears"	Cook, Fatt, Field, Page, Kathleen Warren
13.	"A Bird Flew Around on a Bright Sunny Day"
14.	"Smell Your Way Through the Day"
15.	"The Sporting Salsa"
16.	"Getting Strong!"
17.	"Goodbye from the Wiggles"
18.	"Dorothy's Introduction"

=== Language and Literacy ===
All tracks are written by Murray Cook, Jeff Fatt, Anthony Field, Greg Page, John Field and Dominic Lindsay, except listed below.

No.	Title	Writer(s)	Length
19.	"Hello, We're the Wiggles"
20.	"A Frog Went A Walking"	Trad. Arr. Cook, Fatt, Field, Sam Moran
21.	"The Biggest Smile of All"
22.	"D is for Dorothy"
23.	"Konnichi Wa Everybody"
24.	"Ciao Everybody"
25.	"Hola Everybody"
26.	"Yiasou Everybody"
27.	"I Spy"
28.	"This One is Different"
29.	"One, Two, Three, Four Rhymes"
30.	"First in Line"
31.	"Beach, Beach, Sandy Beach"
32.	"We're All Friends"
33.	"Goodbye From The Wiggles"

== Reception ==
AllMusic gave a positive review, calling the Wiggles a beloved group.
