= The Wiggles Movie =

1997 film by Dean Covell

- Theatrical release poster
- Directed by: Dean Covell
- Written by: Greg Truman
- Produced by: Hilton Fatt
- Starring: Murray Cook; Jeff Fatt; Greg Page; Anthony Field; Tony Harvey; Leeanne Ashley; Carolyn Ferrie; Paul Paddick; Joanne Samuel
- Cinematography: Scott Preston
- Edited by: Marc Van Buuren
- Music by: The Wiggles; John Field
- Production company: Gladusaurus Productions
- Distributed by: 20th Century Fox
- Release date: 18 December 1997
- Running time: 83 minutes
- Country: Australia
- Language: English
- Budget: $1.7 million
- Box office: $2.7 million

The Wiggles Movie (also released as Magical Adventure! A Wiggly Movie internationally) is a 1997 Australian musical film directed by Dean Covell from a screenplay by Greg Truman. Produced by Gladusaurus Productions for 20th Century Fox, it is the first and only feature film starring the Wiggles. The story features amateur magician Wally the Great (Tony Harvey) trying to become a better magician by stealing Greg's magic wand, but is confronted by Dorothy the Dinosaur who believes the Wiggles have forgotten her birthday, while they have actually been planning a surprise party.

== Plot ==
Wally the Great (Tony Harvey), great-grandson of Waldo the Magnificent, is an amateur magician whose dream is to win the competition at the Magic Club for Best Magician. He is confronted with a rival, Roland the Remarkable (Dale Burridge), who believes Wally is a nobody. Meanwhile, the titular children's entertainers, consisting of lead singer Greg Page, guitarist Murray Cook, drummer Anthony Field and keyboardist Jeff Fatt, are performing at a nearby school for Dorothy the Dinosaur's birthday party. As Wally observes their performance from afar, he notices Dorothy. She sulks at the fact everyone had forgotten her birthday, when the Wiggles were actually keeping it a secret from her. She sets down Greg's magic wand, which Wally steals, but he is caught by Dorothy, and the wand breaks in half during their tug of war. Although initially upset, Dorothy agrees to help Wally have it repaired, and the two set off across Wiggle World. The Wiggles decide to head out looking for Dorothy in their Big Red Car, which includes a detour to Henry the Octopus and his Underwater Big Band. When they run out of luck, they go to the Wigglehouse.

Along the way, Wally and Dorothy visit her friends in search of someone who can repair the wand. Through their adventures, Wally gradually learns that true magic comes from entertaining others rather than relying on a magical object. He forms friendships with the residents of Wiggle World, earns Captain Feathersword's Badge of Friendship after rescuing a young pirate from the water, and begins realizing that kindness and courage are more rewarding than recognition. Dorothy complains to Wally that no one remembers her birthday, as each stop they make unintentionally reinforces her belief: Captain Feathersword, Wags the Dog, and everyone else are careful not to divulge the surprise party. Wally assures her that she shouldn't be upset because he didn't forget her birthday, which makes Dorothy feel a little better. Wally has a daydream about his great-grandfather, Waldo, saying to him to believe in himself. With renewed confidence, Wally enters the Magic Club competition. Dorothy and him rush in time to register just before the deadline, rediscover Waldo's old stage equipment and costume, and prepare for his performance. He competes against the other snobby magician, Roland, and ends up winning the competition — including a new wand and a chance to perform at the party later by Cecil. Wally and Dorothy head back to the Wigglehouse, but they find no one is home. Believing The Wiggles have genuinely forgotten her birthday, a heartbroken Dorothy refuses to attend the circus tent celebration, although Wally encourages her to still come along.

At the same time, The Wiggles nearly cancel Dorothy's surprise birthday party after giving up hope of finding her. Cecil, Jimbo and Roland arrive at the circus tent and are informed of the situation. As Cecil announces he will wait for Wally, everyone is stunned when Wally and Dorothy suddenly arrive together. They all surprise Dorothy as she happily reunites with her friends, while Wally apologizes to Greg for breaking his wand and offers Waldo's wand as a replacement. Greg declines, explaining that Wally has earned the heirloom through his kindness, bravery and newfound self-belief. Roland also acknowledges Wally's achievement, and the two reconcile. Dorothy is proud to have found a new friend and that her friends didn’t forget all about her as the film ends with the special birthday celebration, alongside a firework display over the circus tent.

== Cast ==
- Murray Cook as Murray Wiggle
- Jeff Fatt as Jeff Wiggle
- Greg Page as Greg Wiggle
- Anthony Field as Anthony Wiggle
- Tony Harvey as Wally the Great
- Leeanne Ashley as Dorothy the Dinosaur
- Carolyn Ferrie as Dorothy's voice
- Paul Paddick as Captain Feathersword. Paddick also plays Wags the Dog and some other characters.
- Paul Field as Wags the Dog at the circus tent.
- Joanne Samuel as Mrs. Rosemary Bingle

== Production ==
The Wiggles Movie was filmed over four weeks from mid-March to mid-April 1997 at Max Studios in Rosebery, New South Wales. Location filming took place over 23 days at sites like Dame Eadith Walker Hospital in Concord and Oatlands House in Oatlands.

Greg Truman completed the script for the film in August 1996. The Wiggles chose never to collect performance fees for starring in the movie, as their goal was to ensure the film would turn a profit.

With a budget of Australian $1.7 million, filming utilised a combination of studio sets and on-location shoots. Much of the production took place on sound-stages at Max Studios to facilitate easier filming. Outdoor scenes were captured at the hospital and Oatlands House.

When The Wiggles Movie was released to cinemas in Australia in 1997, it faced challenges in turning a profit due to its very young target demographic. Many theatres were hesitant to charge admission for children under 3 years old, who accounted for about half of the intended audience. Despite this, the movie managed to earn back its costs with a box office receipt of Australian $2.7 million.

While the theatrical run was only deemed a modest success, The Wiggles Movie was garnered with positive reviews and later found huge success on home video. It topped Australian video sales charts in 1998 and continued performing well internationally after a 2003 North American DVD release.

== Release ==
The film premiered in Australia on 18 December 1997, and in New Zealand in April 1998.

The film was released on VHS by 20th Century Fox Home Entertainment in June 1998. It included an introductory message by the Wiggles before the start of the film. In New Zealand, the film was released in October 1998. For international markets, the film was retitled Magical Adventure! A Wiggly Movie and was released on VHS and DVD on 4 February 2003. The Australian DVD, released on 12 November 2003, is presented in 1.33:1 format. It features an animated short story, "The Lost Joey", and a photo montage presentation. According to Screen Australia, the video release of the film ranked number 17 in 2011 DVD sales; 15 in 2010; 11 in 2008; 13 in 2007; and 15 in 2005. In the United Kingdom, the film was later released as a double-bill on VHS and DVD on June 20, 2005, by HIT Entertainment, packaged with the group's re-recording of the earliest video, Wiggle Time.

== Reception ==
The film was the highest-grossing locally produced film during 1998 with a gross of $2.7 million.

The Wiggles Movie was also shown in some TV channels from both 1998 and 2003 editions, including the famous time that The Wiggles Movie was shown on Channel 7 (HSV-7, ATN-7, BTQ-7, SAS-7, RVN-2, AMV-4, NEN-9, TNT-9, GWN7, GTS-4/BKN-7, and ITQ-8), although it was showing the 1998 version because it was on October 5, 2003.

== Other media ==
- The Wiggles (1997). The Wiggles Movie Storybook. Bantam Books. 24pp. ISBN 9780733801426.
