= Wiggly Safari =

2002 studio album/video by The Wiggles

Studio album by the Wiggles
- Released: 3 September 2002 (USA)
- Recorded: 2001
- Studios: Electric Avenue and The Vault, Sydney, Australia
- Genre: Children's music
- Length: 45:00
- Label: ABC Music
- Producer: The Wiggles

The Wiggles chronology
Hoop Dee Doo: It's a Wiggly Party (2001)	Wiggly Safari (2002)	Wiggle Bay (2002)

Wiggly Safari is the 14th album by Australian band the Wiggles. It was released in 2002 by ABC Music distributed by Roadshow Entertainment. It was nominated for the 2002 ARIA Music Award for Best Children's Album but lost to Hi-5's Boom Boom Beat.

== Track list ==
All tracks are written by Murray Cook, Jeff Fatt, Anthony Field, Greg Page, except listed below.

No.	Title	Writer(s)	Length
1.	"The Crocodile Hunter (intro)" (spoken)		0:16
2.	"The Crocodile Hunter"	Cook, Fatt, Field, Page, Steve Irwin	1:32
3.	"Australia Zoo (intro)" (spoken)		0:11
4.	"Australia Zoo"	Cook, Fatt, Field, Page, John Field	1:36
5.	"Do the Owl (intro)" (spoken)		0:22
6.	"Do the Owl"	Cook, Fatt, Field, Page, John Field, Dominic Lindsay, Steve Irwin	2:27
7.	"Wobbly Camel (intro)" (spoken)		0:46
8.	"Wobbly Camel"		2:14
9.	"Cocky Want a Cracker (intro)" (spoken)		0:31
10.	"Cocky Want a Cracker"	Steve Irwin, Paul Paddick	2:35
11.	"Old Man Emu (intro)" (spoken)		0:35
12.	"Old Man Emu"	John Williamson	2:37
13.	"Swim With Me (intro)" (spoken)		0:36
14.	"Swim With Me"	Cook, Fatt, Field, Page, Paul Paddick	2:55
15.	"Feeding Time (intro)" (spoken)		0:53
16.	"Feeding Time"	Cook, Fatt, Field, Page, John Field, Steve Irwin	1:51
17.	"Dingo Tango (intro)" (spoken)		0:38
18.	"Dingo Tango"		2:11
19.	"Snakes (intro)" (spoken)		0:14
20.	"Snakes (You Can Look, But You Better Not Touch)"	Cook, Fatt, Field, Page, Steve Irwin	2:01
21.	"Kookaburra Choir (intro)" (spoken)		0:45
22.	"Kookaburra Choir"	Cook, Fatt, Field, Page, John Field	1:46
23.	"We're the Crocodile Band (intro)"		0:14
24.	"We're the Crocodile Band"	Cook, Fatt, Field, Page, John Field	1:36
25.	"Koala La La (intro)" (spoken)		0:19
26.	"Koala La La"		1:27
27.	"You Might Like a Pet (intro)"		0:16
28.	"You Might Like a Pet"	Cook, Fatt, Field, Page, John Field, Dominic Lindsay	1:41
29.	"Dorothy Queen of the Roses"		2:42
30.	"Butterflies Flit (intro)" (spoken)		0:15
31.	"Butterflies Flit"	Cook, Fatt, Field, Page, Marie Field	1:39
32.	"The Wiggle Owl Medley"		5:13

== Charts ==
Chart performance for Wiggly Safari
Chart (2002)	Peak position
Australian Albums (ARIA)	96

== Certifications ==
Certifications for Wiggly Safari
Region	Certification	Certified units/sales
Australia (ARIA)	Gold	35,000^{^}
^{^} Shipments figures based on certification alone.

== Video ==
Wiggly Safari
- Directed by: Gary Matheson (Note: Matheson also directed and produced an Australian television special: The Wiggles in Disneyland, which aired on the Disney Channel Australia in 1998, 4 years earlier.)
- Produced by: Paul Field, Gary Matheson
- Starring: Greg Page; Anthony Field; Murray Cook; Jeff Fatt; Steve Irwin; Terri Irwin; Bindi Irwin
- Distributed by: Roadshow/ABC Video (#102923)
- Release date: 8 July 2002
- Running time: 51:40
- Country: Australia

"Wiggly Safari" was also released in 2002 with special guests Steve Irwin, Terri Irwin, and Bindi Irwin of The Crocodile Hunter.

=== Songs ===
1. "The Crocodile Hunter"
2. "Australia Zoo"
3. "Wobbly Camel"
4. "Cocky Want a Cracker"
5. "Butterflies Flit"
6. "Dorothy Queen of the Roses"
7. "Swim With Me"
8. "Koala La La"
9. "Dingo Tango"
10. "You Might Like a Pet"
11. "Old Man Emu"
12. "Feeding Time"
13. "Do the Owl"
14. "Kookaburra Choir"
15. "Snakes (You Can Look But You Better Not Touch)"
16. "We're the Crocodile Band"

=== Cast ===
As listed in the closing credits.

The Wiggles are

- Murray Cook
- Jeff Fatt
- Anthony Field
- Greg Page

With special guests

- The Crocodile Hunter Steve Irwin
- Terri Irwin
- Bindi Irwin

Also Featuring

- Captain Feathersword: Paul Paddick
- Dorothy the Dinosaur: Corrine O'Rafferty
- Wags the Dog: Andrew McCourt
- Henry the Octopus: Reem Hanwell

The Wiggly Dancers

- Chris Luder
- Larissa Wright
- Ben Murray
- Naomi Wallace

=== Release ===
The Wiggles Wiggly Safari was released on 8 July 2002 in Australia.

The video was dedicated to the memory of Brian Cannizzaro, a New York City firefighter who was killed in the September 11, 2001 attacks on the World Trade Center.
