= Stories and Songs: The Adventures of Captain Feathersword the Friendly Pirate =

Studio album / Story album by The Wiggles
- Released: 10 August 1993
- Recorded: 1993
- Studio: Edward Brothers Studios, Randwick
- Genre: Children's music
- Length: 22:42
- Label: ABC
- Producer: The Wiggles

The Wiggles chronology
Here Comes a Song (1992)	Stories and Songs: The Adventures of Captain Feathersword the Friendly Pirate (1993)	Yummy Yummy (1994)

Stories and Songs: The Adventures of Captain Feathersword the Friendly Pirate is The Wiggles' third album, released in 1993. In the album's story, The Wiggles meet and go on an adventure with Captain Feathersword and his pirate mates to find a treasure chest that he buried on an island years ago. Once they find the buried treasure, they all celebrate the Captain's birthday.

== Plot ==
The Wiggles meet Captain Feathersword and his pirate mates, and all go on an adventure to find buried treasure. As they set sail across the ocean, The Wiggles and pirates encounter a dangerous storm. After navigating the storm, they arrive safe on the island, where they begin to look for the treasure Captain Feathersword buried years ago. The treasure is revealed to be baked beans, which Captain Feathersword says he buried to eat later. As it is the Captain's birthday, The Wiggles surprise him, and the Captain says it's the best birthday he's ever had. The pirate mates sing him a birthday song.

== Track listing ==
All stories and songs composed and written by the Wiggles - J. Fatt, A. Field, M. Cook, G. Page

No.	Title	Length
1.	"Story: Meet Captain Feathersword And His Friends; Song: Captain Feathersword"	3:33
2.	"Story: The Storm; Songs: (a) Wind, Rain And The Sea (b) Our Boat Is Rocking On The Sea"	5:51
3.	"Story: Captain Feathersword's Buried Treasure; Song: Treasure Chest"	7:07
4.	"Story: The Day Penelope, Raj And Imran Surprised Captain Feathersword; Songs: (a) We're Playing A Trick On The Captain (b) Have A Happy Birthday"	6:14

== Personnel ==
Per booklet.

- All male voices: Jeff Fatt, Anthony Field, Murray Cook, Greg Page
- Penelope's voice: Vanessa Fallon-Rohanna
- Produced and Engineered by: the Wiggles
- Photography: Jeff Fatt
- Artwork: Lynne Trevall
- Cover design and illustration: Franciscus Henri
