= Here Comes a Song =

Studio album by the Wiggles
- Released: 12 October 1992
- Recorded: 1992
- Genre: Children's music
- Length: 43:56
- Label: ABC
- Producer: The Wiggles

The Wiggles chronology
The Wiggles (1991)	Here Comes a Song (1992)	Stories and Songs: The Adventures of Captain Feathersword the Friendly Pirate (1993)

Here Comes a Song is the second studio album by Australian children's music group, the Wiggles, released in 1992 by ABC Music distributed by EMI.

== Track listing ==
All music by or trad. arr. by M. Cook/J. Fatt/G. Page/A. Field except listed below.

No.	Title	Music	Length
1.	"We're All Friends"		1:52
2.	"Little Brown Ant"		1:06
3.	"I Knew a Cricket"		0:16
4.	"Uncle Noah's Ark"		2:27
5.	"Dorothy's Birthday Party"		2:28
6.	"Bert the Wombat"		0:12
7.	"Here Comes a Bear"		1:25
8.	"Henry the Octopus"		1:43
9.	"Poesje Mauw"		1:02
10.	"I Love It When It Rains"		1:11
11.	"Three Animals"		1:37
12.	"Sing a Song of Polly"		1:07
13.	"Come and Sail the Sea"		1:28
14.	"A Pirate's Life"		0:22
15.	"Bound For South Australia"		1:21
16.	"The Gypsy Rover"		2:13
17.	"A Family Song"		2:06
18.	"Daniel and Molly"		2:07
19.	"I Look in the Mirror"		1:44
20.	"Fire Engines"		0:43
21.	"Dungley Wobble"		1:00
22.	"Lechoo Yeladim"		1:34
23.	"Dancing Ride"		2:04
24.	"Whenever I Hear This Music"		1:13
25.	"Tidy Up Song"		1:56
26.	"Fly Through the Air"		1:14
27.	"The Magic Kindy"		1:30
28.	"Rainy Day"		0:17
29.	"Glush Swish Mush Nump"		0:20
30.	"It's Been Raining All Day"		0:17
31.	"The Dreaming Song"	Cook, Fatt, Field, Page, John Field	1:40
32.	"The Lion and the Unicorn"		1:48
33.	"Mitten the Kitten"		0:59

== Personnel ==
The Wiggles

- Anthony Field – jaws harp, tin whistle, vocals, tambourine, bodhrán, digeridoo, guitar, hand claps
- Greg Page – lead vocals, guitar, hand claps
- Jeff Fatt – accordion, piano, organ, xylophone, vocals, hand claps, "Jerome's" voice
- Murray Cook – guitar, bass, vocals, kabasa

Additional musicians

- Jane Bezzina – backing vocals on "Little Brown Ant", "The Magic Kindy", "We're All Friends", "Come and Sail the Sea" and "Daniel and Molly"
- Rosemary Richardson – backing vocals on "Henry the Octopus", "Dungley Wobble" and vocals on "A Family Song"
- Peter Mackie – guitar on "The Gypsy Rover"
