= Greg Page (musician) =

Australian musician and singer (born 1972)

Greg Page AM
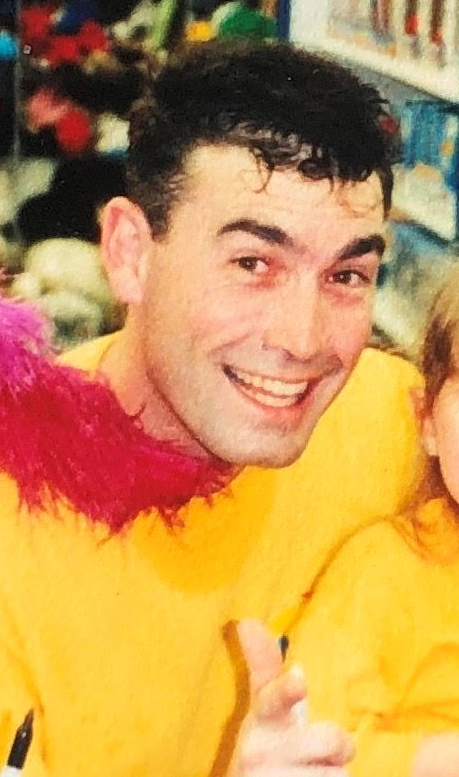
- Page in 1998

Background information
- Born: Gregory John Page; 16 January 1972 (age 54); Sydney, New South Wales, Australia
- Genres: Children's, pop, rock, country
- Occupations: Singer; musician
- Years active: 1991–present
- Formerly of: The Wiggles; The Cockroaches
- Spouses: Michelle Charlton (m. 1996; div. 2008); Vanessa Reid (m. 2009)
- Website: gregpage.com

Gregory John Page (born 16 January 1972) is an Australian singer and musician, best known for being the original lead singer of the children's band The Wiggles from 1991 to 2006 and again in 2012. Since 1998, Page has recorded seven solo albums.

Since the mid-2000s, Page has suffered from severe health problems, which caused his early departure from the Wiggles and brief retirement in 2006; his album Let It Be Me, began production in 2004, but was postponed until 2012 due to his health conditions.

Since returning from retirement in 2009, Page has resumed performing live on stage. In 2012 he rejoined Wiggles as lead singer for their final celebration tour.

Since 2016, Page has continued to reprise his role as Yellow Wiggle for numerous guest appearances including reunion shows, charity events and featured guest spots while occasionally filling in as an understudy performing on stage alongside current members of the group.

After suffering a cardiac arrest during a 2020 reunion concert for bushfire relief, Page has become a prominent advocate for heart health and has founded the charity Heart of the Nation, which focuses on CPR and increasing public accessibility to automated external defibrillators (AEDs).

== Early life and education ==
Page was born in Sydney, Australia. He grew up in Northmead, New South Wales, where he attended Baulkham Hills Primary School. Growing up, he had a low self-esteem. By the time he was 16, his hair started greying. He performed in several bands in secondary school.

== Early career ==
Page was a member of the band Dead Giveaway. He was a roadie for and sang with the Australian band The Cockroaches during the band's final years in the early 1990s. He befriended Cockroach member Anthony Field while on tour.

== The Wiggles ==
=== 1990–2006 ===
After working as a roadie for the Cockroaches, on bandmate Anthony Field's recommendation, he enrolled in Macquarie University to study early childhood education. While students, Page, Field, and guitarist Murray Cook, along with former Cockroaches member and keyboardist Jeff Fatt, combined their music backgrounds and teaching skills to form the Wiggles.

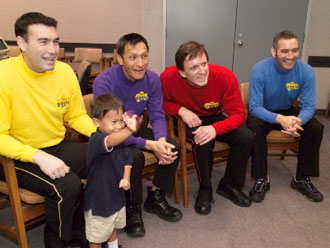
Page (far left/yellow shirt) with The Wiggles and a fan during a visit to NASA on 19 January 2004

Field described Page as "the perfect straight man", with a "big friendly smile and easy stage manner" which made him engrossing for both children and adults. Also according to Field, Page "has an authoritative, though not overbearing, tone when he speaks to children and is a relaxed and clever emcee". When performing with the Wiggles, Page wore a yellow shirt. Like the other Wiggles, Page had a shtick, which was doing magic tricks.

On 30 November 2006, the Wiggles announced that Page would leave the group due to poor health. Although Page was missing for virtually all of the late 2006 U.S. tour, audiences were informed of Page's absence at concerts moments before the curtain went up.

=== 2009–Present ===
Since coming out of retirement in 2009, Page has resumed performing live on stage.

In January 2012, and amidst a great deal of controversy, the Wiggles announced that Page had regained his health and was returning to his role as Yellow Wiggle, replacing Sam Moran, who had succeeded him. It was reported that he would return to touring and rejoin Wiggles as lead singer. On 17 May 2012, it was announced that Page, along with Murray Cook and Jeff Fatt, would be retiring from the Wiggles at the end of the year following their farewell Celebration tour. He was to be replaced by Wiggles cast member Emma Watkins. Page and the others expected to remain involved with the creative and production aspects of the group, though Page no longer would have a share in the company, having sold it in 2006 when he left.

Shortly after leaving the Wiggles, Page joined the cast of the children's educational television program Butterscotch's Playground. Page helped develop the show with its creators.

Beginning in 2016, Page has reunited with the original Wiggles for numerous appearances.

In July 2020, six months after suffering cardiac arrest, he and the original Wiggles appeared in The Soul Movers' music video "Circles Baby". He also contributed to the ReWiggled album in 2022.

In 2024, he returned to live children's performance for the first time in over a decade, serving as an understudy performing alongside the current Wiggles lineup.

== Solo ==
Page released his self-titled debut solo album in 1998. His second album, I Believe in Music, was released four years later, in 2002.

His 2005 solo album, Taking Care of Country, reflects Page's interest in Elvis Presley's music. It was recorded with the TCB Band, Presley's back-up band. In spring 2003, Page performed in Las Vegas with the TCB Band. In 2002, Page sang backup with Australian Elvis impersonator Mick Gerace. His second album with the TCB Band, Let It Be Me, was released in 2012. Production of the album began in 2004, but it was interrupted due to Page's medical issues.

By late 2009, Page had recovered enough from his illness to begin touring with another country rock band, but with a more limited schedule than the Wiggles. He had also started his own foundation, the Greg Page Fund, to raise funds and educate the public about orthostatic intolerance.

In the following years, he has released more solo albums, including: Greg Page Live in Concert (2003), Throw Your Arms Around Me (2004) and Here Comes Christmas! (2015). Page joined the cast of the children's educational television program Butterscotch's Playground. Page helped develop the show with its creators.

In January 2025, it was announced that Page would portray U.S. President Franklin D. Roosevelt in an Australian production of the musical Annie.

== Personal life ==
=== Family ===
Page has been married twice. His first marriage ended during his retirement from the Wiggles; in 2009, he had remarried. He has four children.

=== Elvis memorabilia ===
Page amassed the fourth-largest collection of Elvis Presley memorabilia in the world, including clothing, marriage certificate, guitar, piano, Presley's final Cadillac, and original TCB Band necklaces. In 2008, Page permanently loaned the collection, reportedly worth $1.5 million, to a new Elvis museum named "The King's Castle" in Parkes, New South Wales.

=== Health and retirement ===
Page had experienced health difficulties since December 2005, when he underwent a double hernia operation and withdrew from his group's U.S. tour in August 2006 after suffering repeated fainting spells, slurred speech, fatigue, and trembling. Although Page was missing for virtually all of the Wiggles' late 2006 U.S. tour, audiences were informed of Page's absence at concerts moments before the curtain went up.

At first, Page was told that he had seven more years to live, but he was diagnosed with a non-life-threatening form of dysautonomia, a difficult-to-diagnose chronic illness. Page experienced symptoms such as orthostatic intolerance, fatigue and loss of balance. Specialists believed that Page had mild episodes of the illness going back twelve years, and that his symptoms worsened after his hernias. It was decided that Page would retire from performing with the Wiggles to better manage his health. As part owner of the Wiggles, Page received a payout of about $20 million for his share in the business.

Page was succeeded by Sam Moran as a full member of the entertainment side of the group (although still an employee, rather than a partner, in its business side).

While in retirement, Page was a presenter on Sydney Weekender.

On 17 January 2020, Page suffered cardiac arrest at a Wiggles reunion show that was raising funds for bushfire relief efforts. He collapsed on stage and stopped breathing; off-duty nurse Grace Jones, who was in the audience, performed CPR with Wiggles drummer Steve Pace and band staff member Kimmy Antonelli; they used a defibrillator three times before Page was transported to the hospital. The cardiac arrest was caused by a blocked artery, which was treated, and Page has since made a full recovery. He later posted a video explaining the situation and expressing his gratitude to those who saved him, including Jones, Pace, Antonelli, and Dr. Therese Wales, as well as other members of the Wiggles' crew.

Page has since become an advocate for heart health and more widespread knowledge of CPR, founding a nonprofit initiative called "Heart of the Nation", which has the goal of increasing public awareness of defibrillator locations across Australia, as well as encouraging businesses to keep a defibrillator on-site. He has also participated in several cardiac studies. In 2025, they partnered with the National Heart Foundation of Australia.

== Awards ==
Page was appointed a Member of the Order of Australia on 26 January 2010: "For service to the arts, particularly children's entertainment, and to the community as a benefactor and supporter of a range of charities".

== Filmography ==
=== Television ===
Year	Television	Role	Notes	Ref
1998–2006	The Wiggles	Greg Wiggle		
2005	Da Kath & Kim Code	Greg Wiggle	TV movie	

=== Film ===
Year	Film	Role	Notes	Ref
1997	The Wiggles Movie	Greg Wiggle		

== Discography ==
=== Solo ===
==== Albums ====
Title	Year	Note
Greg Page	1998	
I Believe in Music	2002	
Live in Concert	2003	
Throw Your Arms Around Me	2004	
Taking Care of Country	2005	
Let It Be Me	2012	
Here Comes Christmas!	2015	

=== Singles ===
Title	Year	Note
"Walking Around"	1998	

== Books ==
- Page, Greg; Cadigan, Neil (2011). Now and then: the life-changing journey of the original Yellow Wiggle / Greg Page. Sydney: HarperCollins. ISBN 978-0732289263 (paperback, 341pp.), ISBN 978-0730497295 (e-book, 352pp.)

== Works cited ==
- Field, Anthony; Truman, Greg (2012). How I Got My Wiggle Back: A Memoir of Healing. Hoboken, New Jersey: John Wiley & Sons. 272pp. ISBN 978-1-118-01933-7.
