= Murray Cook =

Australian musician (born 1960)

Murray Cook AM
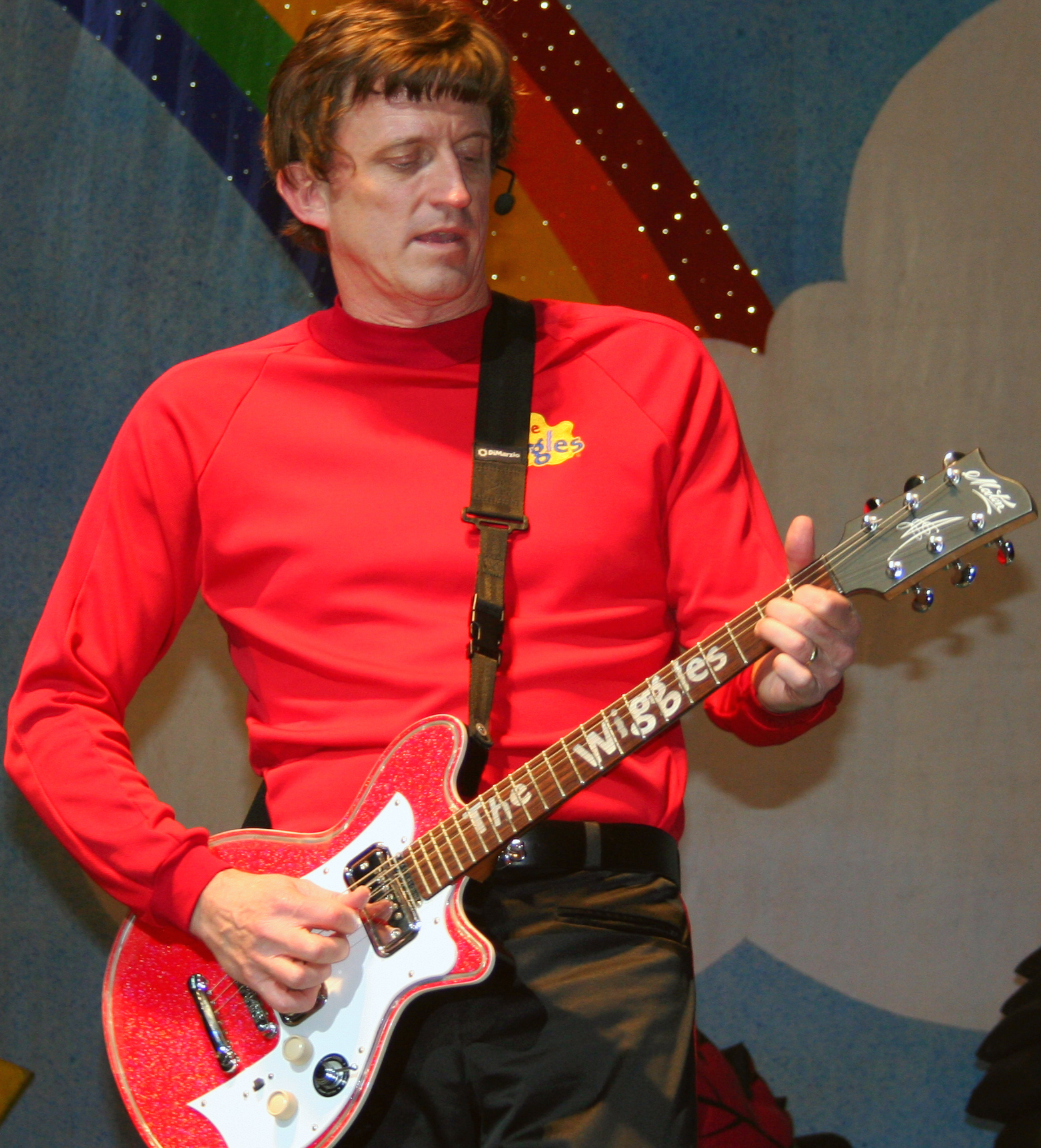
- Cook in 2007

Background information
- Born: Murray James Cook; 30 June 1960 (age 66); Cowra, New South Wales, Australia
- Genres: Children's; rock; Australian rock
- Occupations: Musician; actor; Disc jockey
- Instruments: Guitar; bass guitar; ukulele; vocals
- Years active: 1985–present
- Member of: The Soul Movers
- Formerly of: Bang Shang a Lang; The Wiggles
- Spouse: Meg Munro
- Children: 2, including Georgia

Murray James Cook, AM (born 30 June 1960) is an Australian musician, actor, and DJ. Cook was one of the founding members of the children's band the Wiggles from 1991 to 2012. Cook provided guitar, vocals, and songwriting in the group, and remained involved with its creative and production aspects after his retirement. In 2013, Cook served as the Wiggles' tour manager. He also remains active in many music projects, including, writing and performing with the Sydney soul-rock band The Soul Movers. He is the father of wheelchair basketball player Georgia Munro-Cook. In 2015, he was one of the members of the Australian jury for the Junior Eurovision Song Contest.

== The Wiggles ==
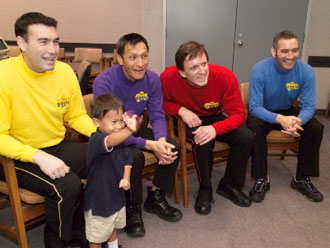
Cook (second from right/red shirt) with the rest of the original Wiggles, during a trip to NASA in 2004.

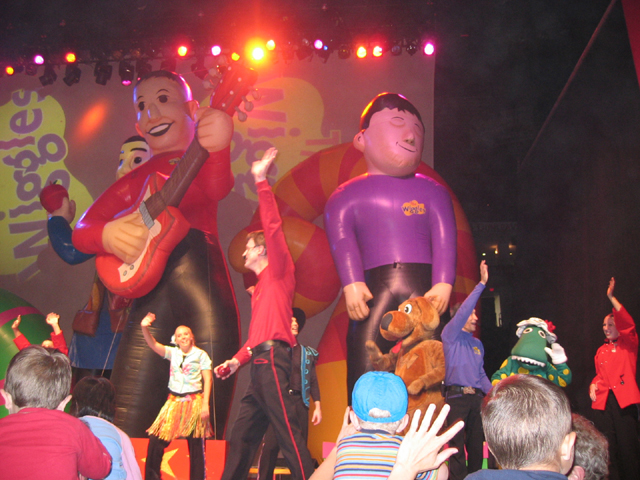
"Wiggly concert": Balloon versions of Murray and Jeff

Cook returned to university and studied early childhood education at Macquarie University, where he met Anthony Field and Greg Page and formed the Wiggles in 1991. Cook worked as a preschool teacher for two years before the success of the Wiggles forced him to quit. According to Field, Cook would have been content to "continue teaching and perhaps move into an academic role in the field. He knows his stuff and is simply great with children". As a member of the Wiggles, Cook wore a red skivvy and served as an instrumentalist and vocalist. He came up with the Wiggles' signature index finger-wagging move after watching professional ten pin bowlers do the move on television. He was considered the intellectual and analytical member of the group (something referred to in several episodes of their TV show), so he acted as mediator for their group decisions. When the Wiggles received honorary degrees from the Australian Catholic University in 2006, Cook gave the commencement speech to the graduates. On 17 May 2012, it was announced that Cook, along with Greg Page and Jeff Fatt, would be retiring from the Wiggles at the end of the year. He was replaced by Wiggles cast member Simon Pryce. Cook and the others expected to remain involved with the creative and production aspects of the group. In 2013, Cook served as the group's tour manager. Cook told the Newcastle Herald, about his music career after his retirement from the Wiggles, "I was kind of feeling my way for a few years, I guess".

== Other works ==
In addition to continuing to play with Bang Shang A Lang, he performed lead guitar for the Proposition, a Sydney-based guitar pop band fronted by singer-songwriter Luke Russell on their 2015 album, Edge of the Dancefloor. Also in 2015, Cook was involved in the production of the play Sons of Sun, which was about American music producer Sam Phillips. In October 2017, Cook played guitar for the tribute show "The Nancy Sinatra/Lee Hazlewood Experience" with Zoe Carides and Scott Holmes in Newcastle, New South Wales.

While exploring other projects, Cook met Lizzie Mack, a member of the Sydney soul-rock band the Soul Movers, who along with Radio Birdman guitarist Deniz Tek and founder of The Soul Movers, were relaunching the group. In 2015, Cook began writing songs with Mack and decided to focus on the band and use it as his "main creative outlet" In 2017, the group recorded Testify, "an album of energetic blues, soul and rock". The album was recorded at the Wiggles' studio in northwest Sydney and Jeff Fatt performed keyboards for the group. In 2019, the group recorded Bona Fide, which the Sydney Morning Herald called "a stunning album". The album, which as Cook stated, included "more roots-oriented songs to try to reflect a wide range of American music styles", and was recorded in the U.S.' "premier soul studios" such as Sun Studios in Memphis, Tennessee, and FAME Studios in Muscle Shoals, Alabama. He appeared with the group at the rock festival Splendour in the Grass in July 2018.

== Personal life ==
In 1986, Cook joined the Sydney-based band Bang Shang a Lang. Cook's major musical influences were the Beatles, the Rolling Stones, the Who, and Eric Clapton. He is married to Meg Munro and has two children, a son and a daughter, wheelchair basketball player Georgia Munro-Cook. On 30 November 2020, 11 months after fellow former bandmate Greg Page collapsed on stage and went into cardiac arrest, Cook opened up about a major health scare which forced him to undergo open heart surgery.

== Awards ==
Cook, along with the other three original members of the Wiggles, was made a Member of the Order of Australia in 2010 "for service to the arts, particularly children's entertainment, and to the community as benefactors and supporters of a range of charities".

== Bibliography ==
- Field, Anthony and Greg Truman. (2012). How I Got My Wiggle Back: A Memoir of Healing. Hoboken, New Jersey: John Wiley & Sons. ISBN 978-1-118-01933-7.
