= List of The Wiggles episodes =

The Australian children's music group The Wiggles have produced several television series. The first one, titled The Wiggles aired in 1998 on Seven Network and consisted of 13 episodes. The second series, also titled The Wiggles, aired in 1999 and consisted of 26 episodes. The shows were also broadcast overseas, most notably on the Disney Channel during their Playhouse Disney block.

In 2002, The Wiggles began filming three seasons worth of shows exclusively with Australian Broadcasting Corporation (ABC). Lights, Camera, Action, Wiggles (Series 3) aired on ABC 4 Kids in 2002, and The Wiggles Show (Series 4 and Series 5) aired in 2005 and 2006. The network called them "the most successful property that the ABC has represented in the pre-school genre". Paul Field, The Wiggles' general manager, reported that a meeting at a New York City licensing fair with Grahame Grassby, the ABC's acting director of enterprises, led to the ABC's "enthusiastic" agreement to produce The Wiggles' TV shows. The three seasons, along with the first two series, aired on Disney Channel in the U.S.

When Sam Moran replaced original group member Greg Page in 2006, the series titled Wiggle and Learn (Series 6) aired in Australia in 2008, but no longer airs on Disney Channel.

Following the transition to the new Wiggles members at the beginning of 2013, a new television series was developed titled Ready, Steady, Wiggle! and aired from 2013 to 2015, continuing with Wiggle Town in 2016, Wiggle, Wiggle, Wiggle! in 2017, The Wiggles' World in 2020, and a new season of Ready, Steady, Wiggle! in 2021. In 2022, Wiggly Fruit Salad aired with the Fruit Salad TV members joining in. In 2023, Ready, Steady, Wiggle! returned for a fourth season.

== The Wiggles TV Series 1 (1998) ==
Also shown on the Disney Channel in 2002.

=== The Wiggles supporting cast ===
- Paul Paddick as Captain Feathersword
- Leeanne Ashley as Dorothy the Dinosaur
- Charmaine Martin and Elyssa Dawson as Henry the Octopus
- Leanne Halloran as Officer Beaples
- Edward Rooke and Paul Field as Wags the Dog
- Carolyn Ferrie as Dorothy's voice, Lilly, Ms. Fez, host of Kaz the Cat
- Niki Owen as Zardo Zap, Lilly's assistant, Ginger the mechanic, sports commentator

=== The Wiggles episode titles ===
1. "Anthony's Friend"
2. "Foodman"
3. "Murray's Shirt"
4. "Building Blocks"
5. "Jeff the Mechanic"
6. "Lilly"
7. "Zardo Zap"
8. "The Party"
9. "Wiggle Opera"
10. "Haircut"
11. "Muscleman Murray"
12. "Spooked Wiggles"
13. "Funny Greg"

== The Wiggles (1999–2000) ==
In 2001–02, in North America, Series 2 was shown before Series 1 on the Disney Channel.

=== The Wiggles supporting cast ===
- Leeanne Ashley as Dorothy the Dinosaur
- Leanne Halloran as Officer Beaples
- Reem Hanwell as Henry the Octopus
- Paul Paddick as Captain Feathersword
- Edward Rooke as Wags the Dog

=== The Wiggles episode titles ===
1. "Food"
2. "Numbers & Counting"
3. "Dancing"
4. "Dressing Up"
5. "Your Body"
6. "At Play"
7. "Safety"
8. "Storytelling"
9. "Friends"
10. "Multicultural"
11. "Musical Instruments"
12. "Hygiene"
13. "Animals"
14. "History"
15. "Family"
16. "Movement"
17. "Nutrition"
18. "Directions"
19. "Manners"
20. "Travel"
21. "Playtime"
22. "The Body"
23. "Communication"
24. "Work"
25. "Imagination"
26. "Cows & Ducks"

== Lights, Camera, Action, Wiggles! (2002–2003) ==
Lights, Camera, Action, Wiggles!, also referred to as The Wiggles TV Series 3, is the third television series by The Wiggles. The series takes place on a fictional television studio as they produce a show called Network Wiggles, with regular on-camera segments as well as the usual music videos. This is the first series to use young adults as Band Dancers in addition to kids dancing. The episodes do not have official titles; they were simply numbered (e.g. "Episode 1", "Episode 37") and ran for 11 minutes. The Disney Channel version for overseas combined two episodes.

=== Lights, Camera, Action, Wiggles! supporting cast ===
- Paul Paddick as Captain Feathersword
- Corinne O'Rafferty as Dorothy the Dinosaur
  - Jacqueline Field as the voice of Dorothy
- Andrew McCourt as Wags the Dog
- Kristy Talbot as Henry the Octopus
- Kase Amer, Sharryn Dermody, Ben Murray, Larissa Wright as band dancers
- Chloe Harrison and Ryan Jago as voiceovers for CSAs

== The Wiggles Show! (2005–2006) ==
The Wiggles Show!, also referred to as The Wiggles TV Series 4 and The Wiggles TV Series 5, is the fourth television series by The Wiggles. The series includes Captain Feathersword segments that involve a larger pirate crew.

=== The Wiggles Show! TV Series 1 episode titles (22-minute version) ===
Also shown on the Disney Channel 2005–2006.

1. "Dorothy's Ballet"
2. "Making Pies"
3. "Friendly Feathersword Crew"
4. "When We Were Young"
5. "Kangaroo Dance"
6. "Shiver Me Timbers"
7. "I Swing My Baton"
8. "Tick-Tock, Tick-Tock"
9. "A Wiggly Mystery"
10. "Prehistoric Party"
11. "Wiggly Friends"
12. "Bow Wow Wow"
13. "We're Taking a Trip Across the Sea"
14. "Paint a Portrait"
15. "S.S Feathersword"
16. "Eagle Rock!"
17. "The Train Dance"
18. "Bill the Billycart"
19. "Jack in the Box"
20. "Fruit Salad"
21. "Learn About Animals"
22. "Help Find Jeff"
23. "I Count 1-10"
24. "Picking Flowers"
25. "Swim With a Friend"
26. "Bailamos"

=== The Wiggles Show! TV Series 2 episode titles (22-minute version) ===
Also shown on the Disney Channel 2007–2008. Order is presented as listed in iTunes.

1. "Fruity Fun"
2. "Let's Have a Dance!"
3. "The Wiggle Way"
4. "Shh! Shh! Shh!"
5. "A Wiggly Concert"
6. "Playing a Trick on the Captain"
7. "The Gorilla Dance"
8. "Pirate Radio"
9. "Amazing Alpaca"
10. "It's Sunny Today"
11. "Picnic Without Ants"
12. "We Like To Say Hello"
13. "Wiggly Shopping List"
14. "Pirate Dancing"
15. "Nodding Dance!"
16. "Musical Bonanza"
17. "O'Reilly!"
18. "Shingle Back Lizard"
19. "Pirate Dancing Shoes"
20. "We Can Do So Many Things"
21. "Box of Mystery"
22. "Look But Don't Touch"
23. "Farmer Brown"
24. "Watch, Learn, Dance, Sing"
25. "Animal Charades"
26. "Fun at the Beach"

== Wiggle and Learn (2008) ==
Wiggle and Learn, also referred to as The Wiggles TV Series 6 (as the two seasons of The Wiggles Show are sometimes counted as two separate series), was the fifth installment of Wiggles television series, It featured Sam Moran as the Yellow Wiggle. It originally aired in April 2008 on the Treehouse channel in Canada. It later aired in Australia on ABC Kids in May 2008, and in the United States in 2008–2009. There were 26 22-minute episodes, although in some formats the series was split into 52 11-minute segments. The choreographers for the series were Leeanne Ashley and Caterina Mete.

=== Wiggle and Learn episode titles (22-minute version) ===
1. "Move and Groove"
2. "Musical Landscape"
3. "Wiggle Dance"
4. "The King of Swing"
5. "Bailar y Cantar"
6. "Barnyard Boogie"
7. "The Bobby Bounce"
8. "The Black Velvet Band"
9. "Fun in the Sun"
10. "My Fair Lady!"
11. "So Early in the Morning"
12. "Soy Capitan"
13. "Together We Live So Happily"
14. "Oh, Captain!"
15. "The Biggest Smile of All"
16. "The Queen of the Land"
17. "Get the Rhythm of the Hips"
18. "Hear the Drumbeat"
19. "Teddy Bear Touch the Ground"
20. "Meadowsweet and Lady Smocks"
21. "Ding, Ding, Dong!"
22. "Buzz, Buzz, Buzz"
23. "Shall We Dance?"
24. "Dance This Way"
25. "Kittens and Mittens"
26. "Surf, Sand and Sun"

=== Wiggle and Learn episode titles (11-minute version) ===
1. "We Feel Like Dancing"
2. "The Shimmie Shake"
3. "Let's Get the Rhythm"
4. "Over in the Meadow"
5. "I Spy"
6. "Keep Moving!"
7. "Who Am I?"
8. "Murray Had a Turtle"
9. "La Bamba"
10. "Oranges and Lemons"
11. "Hey Diddle Diddle"
12. "This Way and That"
13. "Jeff Gets a Letter"
14. "This Old Man"
15. "A Sailor Went To Sea"
16. "Her Eyes Shone Like Diamonds"
17. "Beach, Beach Sandy Beach"
18. "Old Dan Tucker"
19. "London Bridge"
20. "There Was a Princess"
21. "The Banana Boat"
22. "Incy Wincy Spider"
23. "Fairy Dancing!"
24. "Getting Strong"
25. "Pussycat, Pussycat"
26. "Fun at Wigglehouse"
27. "Hello!"
28. "The Five Senses"
29. "Big, Bigger, Biggest!"
30. "See-Saw"
31. "Musical Landscape"
32. "D is for Dorothy"
33. "The Sporting Salsa!"
34. "Jack and Jill"
35. "Wags House"
36. "Two Fine Gentlemen"
37. "Teddy Bear, Teddy Bear"
38. "Wiggletastic"
39. "English Country Garden"
40. "Circus"
41. "Frere Jacques"
42. "The Turkey in the Straw"
43. "Twinkle Twinkle"
44. "Sam Gets a Letter"
45. "I'm A Cowboy"
46. "Smell Your Way Through the Day"
47. "The Horn Pipe"
48. "Miss Polly Had A Dolly"
49. "Allo, Allo, Allo"
50. "Three Little Kittens"
51. "Nick-Nack Paddy-Wack"
52. "I Drive the Big Red Car"

=== Wiggle and Learn supporting cast ===
- Paul Paddick as Captain Feathersword
- Emily McGlinn as Dorothy the Dinosaur
- Adrian Quinnell, Kristy Talbot, and Ben Murray as Wags the Dog
- Mario Martinez-Diaz and Rebecca Knox as Henry the Octopus

== Ready, Steady, Wiggle! (2013–2015, 2021, 2023–present) ==
Ready, Steady, Wiggle! also referred to as The Wiggles TV Series 7 and The Wiggles TV Series 8 is a television series featuring the new Wiggles lineup of Emma Watkins, Lachlan Gillespie, Simon Pryce, and Anthony Field. Greg, Murray and Jeff also make occasional guest appearances in some episodes and videos. The series ran for 2 seasons of 52 11-minute episodes each. It returned in 2021 with a third season with new character Bok the Hand Puppet and new segments. In 2023, a fourth season was commissioned with new members Tsehay Hawkins, Evie Ferris, Caterina Mete, John Pearce and Lucia Field added in the cast.

=== Ready, Steady, Wiggle! TV Series 1 episode titles ===
1. "Miss Polly Had a Dolly"
2. "Wake Up Lachy!"
3. "Lachy Shrunk the Wiggles"
4. "The Wiggly Singing Symphony"
5. "Taba Naba"
6. "Wash Your Hands"
7. "Spring Has Come"
8. "Simon Goes Quackers"
9. "Ooey, Ooey Allergies"
10. "A Lot of Camelot"
11. "Tasty Science"
12. "Toot Toot!"
13. "Invisible Lachy"
14. "Yummy Yummy!"
15. "Let's Go Driving in the Big Red Car"
16. "Excuse Meow!"
17. "Let's All Shake!"
18. "Beautiful Ballet"
19. "Who Am I?"
20. "A Hair Disaster"
21. "Pirate Poetry"
22. "The Mango Walk"
23. "Emma's Missing Bow"
24. "We Like Fruit"
25. "Is That Lachy?"
26. "Hula Hoop Symphony"
27. "Clean Your Teeth!"
28. "Percussion Party"
29. "Marty Party"
30. "Is That Captain Feathersword?"
31. "Is That Wags?"
32. "Harry Hula"
33. "Musical Memory"
34. "Doctor Entertainment"
35. "Singing With Lachy"
36. "Quack, Quack!"
37. "Slow Motion Anthony"
38. "Lounge Room Symphony"
39. "Wiggly Yoga"
40. "A Musical Cake"
41. "The Glass is Half Full"
42. "Simon Says"
43. "Sign the ABC"
44. "Joannie Works With One Hammer"
45. "Doctor Anglais"
46. "Is That Simon?"
47. "Professor Simon's Musical Challenge"
48. "Captain's Experiment"
49. "Doctor Treble Clef"
50. "Captain and the Tomatoes"
51. "What's That Sound?"
52. "A Juicy Story"

=== Ready, Steady, Wiggle! TV Series 2 episode titles ===
1. "Captain's Lost Hornpipe"
2. "Emma's Ballet"
3. "Apples and Bananas"
4. "Emma's Bike Won't Work"
5. "Dressing Up In Style"
6. "Lachy Can't Rhyme"
7. "Simon's Brush With Fame"
8. "Big Red Boat"
9. "Anthony Forgets"
10. "The Hawk"
11. "Simon Can't Stop Yodelling!"
12. "Cowboy Anthony"
13. "Simon's Sad Fruit Salad"
14. "The Talking Cow"
15. "Beaky Can't Sing!"
16. "Little Sir Echo"
17. "Ahoy There, Lachy!"
18. "Emma Can't Read"
19. "This Little Piggy"
20. "Beep Beep Buckle Up!"
21. "Anthony's Singing"
22. "King Simon"
23. "Wiggle Talk"
24. "Wiggle Picnic"
25. "Beaky Overeats"
26. "Zamel the Camel"
27. "Wags Has Lost His Wiggle"
28. "Miss Lucy Had a Ducky"
29. "A Mariachi Moment"
30. "Riding in the Big Red Car"
31. "The Laughing Doctor"
32. "Irish Dancing"
33. "Emma, the Firefighter"
34. "Lachy's Orange Hair"
35. "Romp Bomp A Stomp"
36. "What's Your Favourite Nursery Rhyme?"
37. "Detective Lachy"
38. "Emma's Bad Hair Day"
39. "Lachy Can't Sing"
40. "Say The Dance, Do The Dance"
41. "Emma's Missing Bow"
42. "Captain's Magic Buttons"
43. "Simon, The Opera Singer"
44. "Dorothy's Baking"
45. "Lachy's Bunny Caller"
46. "Food, Trains And Animals"
47. "Princess Emma Of Wiggle House"
48. "Anthony Has Over Eaten!"
49. "Hip Hop With Emma"
50. "Lachy's Bird Poem"
51. "I'll Tell Me Ma"
52. "Lachy's Pappadum Party"

=== Ready, Steady, Wiggle! TV Series 3 episode titles ===
1. "The Transportation Parade"
2. "Exercising with our Friends"
3. "Teamwork in Wiggle Town"
4. "I Can See You, You Can See Me"
5. "Wash Your Hands"
6. "Brr Its Cold Outside"
7. "We're All Fruit Salad"
8. "Captain's Birthday Party"
9. "The Instruments We Love To Play"
10. "How Are You Feeling Today?"
11. "Emma's Missing Glasses"
12. "Rainbow of Colours"
13. "The Foods We Love To Eat"

=== Ready, Steady, Wiggle! TV Series 4 episode titles ===
1. "Old Macdonald Had A Farm"
2. "A Sailor Went To Sea"
3. "Pufferbillies"
4. "This Little Piggy"
5. "The Alphabet Song"
6. "I Like To Eat Apples and Bananas"
7. "Joannie Works With Five Hammers"
8. "Incy Wincy Spider"
9. "Five Little Ducks"
10. "This Old Man"
11. "Rock-A-Bye Your Bear"
12. "Wabash Cannonball"
13. "If You Happy And You Know It"
14. "Row, Row, Row Your Boat"
15. "Twinkle, Twinkle Little Star"
16. "Pat-A-Cake"
17. "Lachy's Bus Ride"
18. "Five Little Wiggles"
19. "Simon Says"
20. "Banbury Cross"
21. "Michael Finnegan"
22. "Five Finger Family"
23. "Humpty Dumpty"
24. "Hot Potato"
25. "Londonderry Hornpipe"
26. "Hey Diddle Diddle"

=== Ready, Steady, Wiggle! TV Series 5 episode titles ===
1. "Captain Feathersword Has the Hiccups"
2. "Jump Like a Kangaroo"
3. "Wiggly Sing-Along Day"
4. "Express Yourself"
5. "Building with Blocks"
6. "Playtime Fun"
7. "Music with Anthony"
8. "Recycling Day"
9. "Wiggle Bay"
10. "Caterina's Shopping List"
11. "Let's Go Riding with Ponso"
12. "Storytime with Lachy and Simon"
13. "Wags Can't Stand Still!"
14. "Lucia's Favourite Doll"
15. "Pull a Funny Face"
16. "Evie's Favourite Band"
17. "Marty the Human Party"
18. "Baby Dorothy Won't Sleep"
19. "John's Baby Nephew"
20. "Captain Feathersword Can't Sing"
21. "The Toy and Fairy Parade"
22. "Pirate Dancing"
23. "The Wiggles Lose Their Wiggle!"
24. "Blow Me Down"
25. "Simon Is Echoing"
26. "The Captain Feathersword Hat Routine"

=== Ready, Steady, Wiggle! TV Series 6 episode titles ===
1. "8 Wiggles Dancing"
2. "John's Fruit Salad"
3. "Captain's Magic Buttons"
4. "Wags Is Bored"
5. "The Return of the Carrot Sticks"
6. "Lachy's Shrinking Spray"
7. "Simon's Rosy Arrangement"
8. "Drawing with Lucia"
9. "Rock 'n' Roll with Anto"
10. "Dorothy's Un-rosy Tea"
11. "Tsehay's Lost Her Voice"
12. "Slipping on the Goodship Feathersword"
13. "Lachy's Robot Cleaner"
14. "The Teddy Bear Picnic"
15. "Gardening Tips with Lachy"
16. "The Air Orchestra"
17. "The Wiggly Days of the Week"
18. "Doing a Handstand"
19. "Dorothy and Henry's Pretend Wedding"
20. "Reading and Relaxation"
21. "Storytime with The Wiggles"
22. "Dorothy at the Doctors"
23. "What's That, Henry?"
24. "The Wiggly Circus"
25. "Dorothy's Loose Tooth"
26. "Rainy Day Music"

=== Ready, Steady, Wiggle! TV Series 7 episode titles ===
1. "Having Fun at the Beach"
2. "Simon's Bird Calls"
3. "Wiggly Superheroes"
4. "Doggy Dancing with Wags"
5. "The Wiggly Art Exhibition"
6. "Simon's Lost His Voice"
7. "Where is Dorothy?"
8. "Henry Learns Ballet"
9. "Captain Feathersword's Pirate Training Camp"
10. "Dorothy's Surprise Party"
11. "Lachy's Time Twister 3000"
12. "Colours, Colours Everywhere!
13. "Dance with the Tree of Wisdom"
14. "Writing a Poem with Evie"
15. "Painting Shapes with Lucia"
16. "Captain the Copy Robot"
17. "Wake Up Lachy!"
18. "Lucia the Drumming Superstar"
19. "The Tree of Wisdom's Grand Dance Contest"
20. "Music Day at Wiggle House"
21. "Babysitting Caterina's Twins"
22. "Wiggle Your Ears with Wags"
23. "Making a Sound Song"
24. "Simon's Rhymin'
25. "Wiggly Camping Trip"
26. "Sharing Lemonade with The Wiggles"

=== Ready, Steady, Wiggle! TV Series 8 episode titles ===
1. "The Crocodile Way"
2. "Planets in the Solar System"
3. "John the Hairdresser"
4. "Learning Shapes With Caterina"
5. "Bubbles!"
6. "The Name Game"
7. "Lachy's Friend"
8. "Captain Feathersword's Picnic"
9. "Folding Towels Can Be Fun!"
10. "Dorothy's Dancing Roses"
11. "I Spy: Letters and Sounds"
12. "John and Henry's Sea Creature Adventure"
13. "Crossword Puzzle"
14. "Walk a Million Miles"
15. "Dancing the Hornpipe on the S.S Feathersword"
16. "The Tree of Wisdom's Hat"
17. "Tap Dancing with Lucia"
18. "Simon Has the Hiccups"
19. "Making a Happy Story"
20. "Evie's Insect Adventure"
21. "Limbo!"
22. "Playing Fetch with Wags and Captain Feathersword"
23. "The Mayor of Wiggle Town"
24. "Trimming the Hedges"
25. "Bush Doof!"
26. "The Captain of the Opera"
27. "Easel-y Done!"
28. "The Great Cowbell and Kazoo Duet!"
29. "Evie Goes to the Beach"
30. "Doing the Dishes Is Fun!"
31. "Surf's Up!"
32. "The Wiggles Go to the Library"
33. "Anthony Learns the Theremin!"
34. "Hot Poppin' Popcorn!"
35. "Exercise with The Tree of Wisdom"
36. "Rockin' Robot Marty!"
37. "Captain Feathersword's Lost Hat"
38. "Opposites!"
39. "The Wiggly Garage Sale"
40. "Messy Clean"
41. "Wiggly Picnic"
42. "Dance, Dance, Dance!"
43. "Dorothy the Dinosaur's Party"
44. "I Spy: Colours"
45. "Captain Feathersword's Pirate Obedience School"
46. "Lachy's Famous Stir Fry"
47. "Wiggly News"
48. "The Amusement Park"
49. "Peek-a-Boo!"
50. "Playing Catch with Wags & Captain"
51. "Simon's Pickup Truck"
52. "The Wiggly Medley"

== Wiggle and Learn 2024 ==
Wiggle and Learn, which premiered on February 22, 2024, introduced Buddy and DJ Dorothy.

=== Wiggle and Learn 2024 episode titles ===
1. "Animals"
2. "Planes"
3. "Bedtime"
4. "Exercise"
5. "Preschool"
6. "Food"
7. "Transport"
8. "Emotions"
9. "Dolls"
10. "Fitness"
11. "Colours"
12. "Musical Dynamics"
13. "My Body"
14. "World"
15. "Friendship"
16. "Space"
17. "Halloween"
18. "Techno Party"
19. "Family"
20. "Best of No. 1"
21. "Thank You"
22. "Fairytales"
23. "Cooking"
24. "Safety"
25. "Numbers"
26. "Love"
27. "Quiz Show"
28. "Birthday Party Fun"
29. "Dinosaurs"
30. "Musical Instruments"
31. "Dressing Up"
32. "Holiday Time"
33. "Fun"
34. "Story Time"
35. "Sport"
36. "Pets"
37. "Gardening"
38. "Indoor Play"
39. "Cinderella Fairytale"
40. "Best of No. 2"

== Wiggle Town! (2016) ==
Wiggle Town! also referred to as The Wiggles TV series 9 is a short Television series based on the video of the same name. It's the second series to feature the new Wiggles lineup. the series contains 52 5-minute episodes each.

=== Wiggle Town! episode titles ===
1. "The Wonder of Wiggle Town"
2. "Twinkle Twinkle"
3. "Ballet Time"
4. "Teddy Bear, Teddy Bear, Turn Around"
5. "Emma's Riding Boots"
6. "Wiggly Concert"
7. "Wiggle Express"
8. "Wiggletto"
9. "Do The Pretzel"
10. "Come On Down to Wiggle Town"
11. "Let's Irish Dance"
12. "Wags Loves to Tango"
13. "Little Dingo"
14. "Dance Dance!"
15. "Irish Stew"
16. "Romp Bomp A Stomp"
17. "Henry Likes Water"
18. "Opera Singing"
19. "Officer Beaples"
20. "I Went to the Library"
21. "Toot Toot, Chugga Chugga"
22. "Fruit Salad"
23. "Rock-A-Bye Your Bear"
24. "Hot Potato"
25. "The Sidewalks of New York"
26. "Here Comes a Bear"
27. "D-I-N-G-O"
28. "Dogs, Cats. Bunnies and Fish"
29. "Emma's Yellow Bow"
30. "Wiggly Arena"
31. "Joannie"
32. "Little Sir Echo"
33. "Buzz, Buzz!"
34. "Rock & Roll Preschool"
35. "Lavenders Blue"
36. "Tap Dancing Time"
37. "Say the Dance, Do the Dance"
38. "It's a Beautiful Day"
39. "Simon Says"
40. "Yummy Yummy"
41. "Apples & Bananas"
42. "Wiggle Town Dancing Police"
43. "Laugh, Draw, Sing Anything"
44. "The Little Boat"
45. "Broccoli Bunch"
46. "Police Plies"
47. "Wobbly Camel"
48. "I'm Going To Ride My Bike Today"
49. "Piano Party"
50. "Do the Propeller"
51. "It's Okay to Cry"
52. "Springtime"

== Wiggle, Wiggle Wiggle! (2017) ==
Wiggle, Wiggle, Wiggle! also referred to as The Wiggles TV Series 10 is a Television series starring the new Wiggles lineup being their third one after Ready, Steady, Wiggle! and Wiggle Town. this series contains 26 22-minute episodes each.

=== Wiggle, Wiggle, Wiggle! episode titles ===
1. "Hello Everyone"
2. "Bow Mobile to the Rescue"
3. "Wiggly Radio"
4. "No Fleas Please"
5. "The Wiggly Races"
6. "The Singing Barbers"
7. "A Wiggly Wedding"
8. "Dancing Is So Nice Fun"
9. "Numerals Are Nice"
10. "Yummy in My Tummy"
11. "Waltzing Matilda"
12. "Rock & Roll Preschool"
13. "Hot Potato"
14. "The Wiggly Opera"
15. "Clap Your Hands"
16. "Feather Fun!"
17. "Fly Through The Sky"
18. "Pigtail Polka"
19. "Soccer Fun"
20. "Dance with Emma"
21. "Enthusiasm"
22. "Simon Says"
23. "Henry Saves the Day"
24. "Dorothy's Tea Party"
25. "The Wiggly Plane"
26. "Do The Twist!"

== The Wiggles' World (2020) ==
The Wiggles' World also referred to as The Wiggles TV Series 11 is a Television series starring the new Wiggles lineup it's their fourth one after Wiggle, Wiggle, Wiggle. this series contains 26 11-minute episodes each.

=== The Wiggles' World episode titles ===
1. "Five-Fingered Family"
2. "Avo, Avo, Avocado"
3. "We Got Our Glasses On"
4. "Cowboy Fun"
5. "Shirley Shawn the Unicorn"
6. "We're All Friends"
7. "Stinky Cheese Day!"
8. "Lachy's Curly World"
9. "World Record Dancing"
10. "A King Who Liked to Sing!"
11. "Surfer Bop"
12. "Emma's Weather Bag"
13. "Sticky Rice Cake Surprise"
14. "Broccoli Bunch"
15. "A Puppet Show"
16. "Funny Face"
17. "Put the Pop In The Popcorn"
18. "Double Talk With Captain"
19. "Hot Dog!"
20. "Cream Pie Fun"
21. "It's Sunny Today"
22. "The Curly Bird"
23. "Dance Spectacular!"
24. "Sensational Salsa"
25. "Little, Little, Little Lord Fauntleroy"
26. "Dorothy's Rosy Tea-Time"

== Wiggly Fruit Salad (2022) ==
Wiggly Fruit Salad also referred to as The Wiggles TV Series 13 is a short Television series starring the new Wiggles lineup after Emma left the band. Tsehay has her first appearance alongside Fruit Salad TV's John, Evie and Kelly. this series contains 10 5 and a 1/2-minute episodes.

=== Wiggly Fruit Salad episode titles ===
1. "Sing Together"
2. "Wiggly Friendship"
3. "Big Strong John"
4. "Is There Anything Bok Can't Do"
5. "Thank You Lollipop Person"
6. "Paloma, The Modern Mermaid"
7. "Let's Do the Choppy Corker"
8. "Tsehay's Sunflower Power"
9. "Wave To The Garbage Truck"
10. "Food Makes You Big And Strong"

== See also ==
- Dorothy the Dinosaur
- The Wiggles videography
