= The Wiggles videography =

This is a list of videos released by the Wiggles. Re-releases that combine two or more videos into one are not counted.

== Videos featuring Greg Page: 1993–2006 ==
This is a list of Wiggles videos featuring Greg Page as the Yellow Wiggle. Catalog numbers are primarily based on the original VHS, although many of the videos were later released on DVD (indicated by "-9" in Roadshow catalog number and five-digit Hit Entertainment catalog number) and/or repackaged as bundles.

List of videos released by the Wiggles
Title (North American title)	Australian Release	Roadshow Catalog No.	North American Release	Hit Catalog No.	Notes
Wiggle Time	Sep 1993	13536	N/A		VHS only
Yummy Yummy	Oct 1994	14480	N/A		VHS only
Big Red Car (Dance Party)	Oct 1995	17128; 102786	2001	2516	
Wake Up Jeff!	Aug 1996	100096; 102785	2000	2514 & 2503	VHS only
Wiggledance!	June 1997; 1998 (2nd ed.)	100766	N/A		VHS only
Wiggly, Wiggly Christmas	Oct 1997; 1999 (2nd ed.)	100767; 102341	2000	2505	also released in UK 1999
Yummy Yummy (re-recording)	1998	101409	1999	2511	completely redone from the 1994 version
Wiggle Time (re-recording)	1998	101410	1999	2512	completely redone from the 1993 version
Toot, Toot!	Oct 1998; 1999 (2nd ed.)	101484; 102342	2001	2515 & 2504	also released in UK 1999
The Dorothy the Dinosaur and Friends Video	May 1999	101650	N/A		VHS only
The Wiggly Big Show	Sep 1999	101399	N/A		VHS only, reached 8th on the Australian Film Commission's Top 10 Children's Retail Video Titles in 2000 and 2006
Captain Feathersword, the Friendly Pirate	May 2000	102555	N/A		VHS only
It's a Wiggly Wiggly World	July 2000	102675	2002	2509	
Hoop Dee Doo: It's a Wiggly Party	June 2001	103114	2002	2510	
Yule Be Wiggling	Oct 2001	102923	2001	2508	
Wiggly Safari	July 2002	103397	2002	2517	
Wiggle Bay	Sep 2002	103550	2003	2502	
Space Dancing	Mar 2003	103710	2003	2520	
Whoo! Hoo! Wiggly Gremlins	Sep 2003	103853	2004	2529.01	
Top of the Tots	Mar 2004	104173	2004	2521.01	ranked #18 on the Australian Film Commission top 20 titles on video for the 2004 year.
Cold Spaghetti Western	Aug 2004	104325	2004	2518.01	
Santa's Rockin'	Nov 2004	104331	2004	2531.01	
Live Hot Potatoes!	Mar 2005	104658	2005	2532	
Sailing Around the World	Aug 2005	105060	2005	2538	
Here Comes the Big Red Car	Mar 2006	105767	2006	N/A	remake of Big Red Car, Last VHS in Australia
It's Time to Wake Up Jeff (Wiggle Around the Clock)	2006	105768-9	2006	N/A	remake of Wake Up Jeff!, Last VHS in United States
Splish Splash Big Red Boat	June 2006	105768-9	2006	N/A	
Wiggledancing Live in the USA	N/A	N/A	2006	N/A	
Racing to the Rainbow	Sep 2006	R-106364-9	2007	N/A	

== Videos featuring Sam Moran: 2007–2011 ==
This is a list of Wiggles videos featuring Sam Moran as the Yellow Wiggle. The catalog numbers are for the DVD releases in Region 4 (Australia and New Zealand). Some videos were also subsequently released on Blu-ray.

Source: Powerhouse Museum, Catalog Numbers from National Library of Australia.

List of videos released by the Wiggles (2007–2011)
Title	Region 4 Release	Roadshow Catalog No.	Region 1 Release	Notes and Refs
Wiggledancing! Live In Concert	March 2007	R-106884-9	N/A	also Region 2
Wiggle and Learn: Getting Strong	May 2007	R-106894-9	2007	
Pop Go the Wiggles!	Sep 2007	R-107534-9	2008	
You Make Me Feel Like Dancing	June 2008	R-108232-9	2008	
Sing a Song of Wiggles	Sep 2008	R-108371-9	2008	
Go Bananas!	Mar 2009	R-108853-9	2009	
Big Big Show	June 2009	R-109153-9	2009	
Hot Poppin Popcorn	Sep 2009	R-109483-9	2010	
Hot Potatoes: The Best of the Wiggles	Mar 2010	R-110067-9	2010	
Let's Eat	Sep 2010	R-111009-9	2011	
Ukulele Baby	Mar 2011	R-111517-9	2011	
Big Birthday	June 2011	R-111899-9	2012	
It's Always Christmas With You!	Nov 2011	R-112171-9	2011	

== Videos featuring Greg Page: 2012 ==
This is a list of Wiggles videos featuring Greg Page returning to the main cast as the Yellow Wiggle. The catalog numbers are for the DVD releases in Region 4 (Australia and New Zealand). Some videos were also subsequently released on Blu-ray.

Source: Release dates from ABC Shop, Catalog numbers from National Library of Australia.

List of videos released by the Wiggles (2012)
Title	Region 4 Release	Roadshow Catalog No.	Region 1 Release	Notes and Refs
Surfer Jeff	June 2012	R-112654-9	2013	
Celebration	September 2012	R-112934-9	2012	Live concert video in Dublin, Ireland

== Videos featuring the new Wiggles: 2013–2021 ==
This is a list of Wiggles videos featuring the new generation.

Source: Release dates from ABC Shop, Catalog numbers from National Library of Australia.

List of videos released by the Wiggles (2013–2021)
Title	Region 4 Release	Roadshow Catalog No.	Region 1 Release	Notes and Refs
Taking Off!	2013	R-113470-9	2013	
Furry Tales	2013	R-113628-9	2014	
Pumpkin Face (Wiggly Halloween)	2013	R-113823-9	2013	
Go, Santa, Go!	2013	R-114180-9	2014	
Hot Potatoes!: The Best of the Wiggles	2014	R-114337-9	2014	redone version with songs from the new Wiggles
Apples and Bananas	2014	R-114438-9	2014	
Wiggle House	2014	R-114668-9	2015	
Rock & Roll Preschool	2015	R-115140-9	2016	
Meet the Orchestra!	2015	R-122978-9	–	
Wiggle Town!	2016	R-123272-9	2016	
Dance Dance!	2016	R-123276-9	–	
Wiggle Around Australia	2017	R-123275-9	–	
Duets	2017	R-127364-9	2017	
Emma's Bowtiful Ballet Studio	2017	R-127357-9	–	
Nursery Rhymes	2017	R-127352-9	2018	
Wiggly, Wiggly Christmas!	2017	R-127356-9	2017	
The Best of The Wiggles	2018	R-123273-9	2018	
Nursery Rhymes 2	2018	R-127347-9	2018	
Wiggle Pop!	2018	R-127161-9	2019	
Big Ballet Day!	2019	R-127162-9	2019	
Party Time	2019	R-127425-9	2019	
Fun and Games	2020	R-127159-9	2020	
Choo Choo Trains, Propeller Planes & Toot Toot Chugga Chugga Big Red Car!	2020	R-127390-9	2020	
We're All Fruit Salad!	2021	R-127395-9	2021	
Lullabies with Love	2021	R-127399-9	2021	
Halloween Party	2021	R-115161-9	2021	

== Videos featuring Tsehay Hawkins: 2022–present ==
This is a list of Wiggles videos featuring Tsehay Hawkins as the Yellow Wiggle.

Source: Release dates from ABC Shop, Catalog numbers from National Library of Australia.

List of videos released by the Wiggles (2022–present)
Title	Region 4 Release	Roadshow Catalog No.	Region 1 Release	Notes and Refs
Super Wiggles	2022	R-123639-9	2022	
Wiggly Nursery Rhymes				Originally released on The Wiggles' YouTube channel on June 6, 2022. later received a digital release in 2023.
Fruit Salad Big Show	2022	R-125497-9	2023	Last video released on DVD in Australia and the United States.
The Sound of Halloween				Released only on digital platforms in 2023.
The Sound of Christmas				Released only on digital platforms in 2023.

== TV series compilations ==
=== Selection of episodes ===
- Wiggly TV (2000 AUS) – 2 episodes from TV Series 2 (Roadshow ABC 102913), 3 on DVD version
- Wiggly Play Time (2001 US) – 3 episodes from TV Series 2 VHS only on 14 August 2001 followed by DVD on 2 November 2004.
- Lights, Camera, Action! (2005) – 2 episodes from TV Series 3 & 2 episodes from TV Series 2
- The Wiggles Show – The Pick of TV Series 4 (2010) – 9 episodes
- Ready, Steady, Wiggle! – The Pick of TV Series 5 (2010) – 9 episodes
- Wiggle and Learn – The Pick of TV Series 6 (2011) – 18 episodes
- Wake Up Lachy! (2014) – 12 episodes from Ready, Steady, Wiggle! TV series 1
- Emma's Bowtiful Day (2014) – 12 episodes from Ready, Steady, Wiggle! TV series 1
- Anthony's Fruity Feast (2015) – 12 episodes from Ready, Steady, Wiggle! TV Series 2
- Simon Says (2016) – 12 episodes from Ready, Steady, Wiggle! TV Series 2
- Fun, Fun, Fun! (2016) – 12 episodes from Ready, Steady, Wiggle! TV Series 2
- Sing Dance and Play (2019) – 7 episodes from Wiggle Wiggle Wiggle! TV Series
- Eat, Sleep, Wiggle, Repeat! (2020) – 7 episodes from Wiggle Wiggle Wiggle! TV Series
- The Wiggles' World (2020) - 13 episodes from The Wiggles' World

=== Boxsets ===
TV series box-sets (Australia release only)

- The Wiggles – TV Series 1 Collectors Box Set (2005)
- The Wiggles – TV Series 2 Collection (2007)
- Lights, Camera, Action! Wiggles! – TV Series 3 (2008)
- Fab Four Faves (2016)

== Movie ==
- The Wiggles Movie (1997 AUS) (known in US as Magical Adventure: A Wiggly Movie, 4 February 2003) – 20th Century Fox (Catalog #6246SVP)

== Documentaries ==
- Behind the Scenes of Cold Spaghetti Western (2004)
- A Wiggly Postcard from Asia (2004)
- On the Road with The Wiggles (2005)
- Happy 15th Birthday (2006) – ABC
- The Wiggles Take On the World (2006) – 46 minute Accord documentary by Talking Heads Productions and Film Finance Corporation
- On the Road with The Wiggles (2008) – ABC
- The Wiggles' Great Adventure! (2011)
- Everybody Clap! Everybody Sing! (2011) – documentary for parents on the Wiggles. Listed on Sprout on Demand, broadcast October–December 2011
- Hot Potato: The Story of The Wiggles (2023) - Sam Content Pty Ltd

== Broadcast specials ==
- The Wiggles Live at Disneyland – broadcast on Disney Channel Australia on 20 December 1998
- The Wiggles Big Show - broadcast on Disney Channel Australia on 17 September 2000
- The Wiggles Big Big Show in the Round – theatre broadcast in 2009
- The Wiggles Greatest Hits Show – theatre broadcast in 2011
- The Wiggles Australia Day Concert Special – broadcast on ABC for Kids on 2, on 26 January 2011
