= The Rare Old Mountain Dew =

Irish folk song dating to 1882

Single by John Griffin
- B-side: "My Beauty of Limerick"
- Published: 1882
- Released: 1927
- Recorded: February 3, 1927
- Genre: Irish folk
- Label: Columbia
- Composer: David Braham
- Lyricist: Edward Harrigan

"The Rare Old Mountain Dew" is a folk song dating from 1882.

== History ==
"The Mountain Dew" was a song about poitín (Irish moonshine) with lyrics by New York musical theater great Edward Harrigan and music credited to Harrigan's orchestra leader David Braham. The tune, however, owes an obvious debt to the older song "The Girl I Left Behind". It was first performed as part of the 1882 Harrigan production The Blackbird. and was later printed in Colm Ó Lochlainn's 1916 Irish Street Ballads. The earliest recording in the 78 rpm era was made in New York in 1927 by John Griffin for the Columbia label. Some later recordings used the title "The Rare Old Mountain Dew."

The song is referenced in The Pogues' song "Fairytale of New York":

And then he sang a song
The Rare Auld Mountain Dew
I turned my face away
And dreamed about you.

== Recordings ==
- Four to the Bar on their live album Craic on the Road.
- Sam Hinton on "the Wandering Folksong".
- Orthodox Celts on their album Green Roses.
- The Pogues with Ronnie Drew from The Dubliners, singing together with Shane MacGowan.
- The Dubliners.
- The Clancy Brothers performed it on several albums, in some versions also together with The Dubliners.
- Carolina Chocolate Drops Appalachian style version performed on album Heritage with fiddle and banjo.
- The Wiggles on Wake Up Jeff! as "Bucket of Dew/Paddy Condon from Cobar".
- The Irish Rovers
- The Corries
- Ottilie Patterson recorded it as The Real Old Mountain Dew on the EP Ottilie Swings the Irish in December 1959 with Chris Barber's Jazz Band

== Lyrics ==
Lilting is often added to the song, either after every second verse or once at the beginning and once at the end, to the same tune as the lyrics. While these vocables vary with the singer, one typical version is "hi dee diddley idle dum, hi dee doodle dydle dum, hi dee doo dye diddly aye day", repeated once.

== See also ==
- Good Old Mountain Dew
