= Surfer Jeff =

2012 studio album/video by The Wiggles

Studio album by the Wiggles
- Released: 3 May 2012
- Genre: Children's music
- Label: ABC
- Producer: Anthony Field

The Wiggles chronology
| It's Always Christmas With You! (2011) | Surfer Jeff (2012) | Celebration! (2012) |

Surfer Jeff is the thirty-fifth album by the Wiggles, released in 2012, by ABC Music, distributed by Universal Music Australia. It was the first album to feature Greg Page back in the group's line-up since Racing to the Rainbow in 2006, as well as the last to feature the original Wiggles line-up until the 2022 album ReWiggled.

The album won the ARIA Award for Best Children's Album at the ARIA Music Awards of 2012.

== Track list ==
| No. | Title | Writer(s) | Length |
|---|---|---|---|
| 1. | "Here Come Our Friends" | Greg Page |
| 2. | "Surfer Jeff" | Murray Cook, Jeff Fatt, Anthony Field, Simon Pryce |
| 3. | "Up, Down, Turn Around" | Greg Page |
| 4. | "The Mini Foxie Puppy Dance" | Anthony Field, John Field, Simon Pryce |
| 5. | "Ooey, Ooey, Ooey Allergies" | Murray Cook, Jeff Fatt, Anthony Field, John Field, Simon Pryce |
| 6. | "Look Before You Go" | Murray Cook, Jeff Fatt, Anthony Field, John Field, Paul Field |
| 7. | "It's Peanut Butter!" | Murray Cook, Jeff Fatt, Anthony Field, Simon Pryce |
| 8. | "What's the Weather Today?" | Anthony Field, John Field, Paul Field |
| 9. | "I Love Oranges" | John Field |
| 10. | "Mango Walk" | Trad. Arr. Murray Cook, Jeff Fatt, Anthony Field |
| 11. | "Banananana" | John Field |
| 12. | "Waltzing Matilda" | Trad. Arr. Murray Cook, Jeff Fatt, Anthony Field, John Field |
| 13. | "An Irish Dinosaur Tale" | Trad. Arr. Murray Cook, Jeff Fatt, Anthony Field, Greg Page, Simon Pryce |
| 14. | "Olive Oil is My Secret Ingredient" | Alfonso Rinaldi |
| 15. | "C'est Wags, C'est Bon" | Murray Cook, Jeff Fatt, Anthony Field, Greg Page, John Field, Dominic Lindsay |
| 16. | "Dorothy the Dinosaur's Beach Party" | Murray Cook, Jeff Fatt, Anthony Field, Greg Page, Caterina Mete |
| 17. | "Rolling Down the Sandhills" | Murray Cook, Jeff Fatt, Anthony Field, Greg Page, John Field, Dominic Lindsay |
| 18. | "Running Up the Sandhills" | Murray Cook, Jeff Fatt, Anthony Field, Greg Page, John Field, Dominic Lindsay |
| 19. | "Would You Like to Go to Scotland?" | Murray Cook, Jeff Fatt, Anthony Field, Greg Page, Dominic Lindsay |
| 20. | "Balla Balla Bambina" | Alfonso Rinaldi |
| 21. | "London Barcarolle" | Trad. Arr. Murray Cook, Jeff Fatt, Anthony Field, Dominic Lindsay, Simon Pryce |

== Video ==
Surfer Jeff
- Directed by: Anthony Field, Paul Field
- Starring: Greg Page; Anthony Field; Murray Cook; Jeff Fatt; Simon Pryce
- Distributed by: Roadshow/ABC DVD
- Release date: 21 June 2012
- Running time: 57:19
- Country: Australia

Surfer Jeff was released on ABC DVD in 2012. Greg Page returns as the yellow Wiggle.

=== DVD Song List ===
1. "Here Come Our Friends"
2. "Dorothy the Dinosaur's Beach Party"
3. "Up, Down, Turn Around"
4. "The Mini Foxie Puppy Dance"
5. "Ooey, Ooey, Ooey Allergies!"
6. "It's Peanut Butter!"
7. "I Love Oranges"
8. "Mango Walk"
9. "Banananana"
10. "What's The Weather Today?"
11. "Rolling Down the Sandhills"
12. "Running Up the Sandhills"
13. "Olive Oil Is My Secret Ingredient"
14. "Balla Balla Bambina"
15. "C'est Wags, C'est Bon"
16. "Surfer Jeff"
17. "An Irish Dinosaur Tale"
18. "Would You Like To Go To Scotland?"
19. "London Barcarolle"
20. "Look Before You Go"
21. "Waltzing Matilda"

=== Cast ===
The cast as presented on the videos:

The Wiggles are
- Murray Cook
- Jeff Fatt
- Anthony Field
- Greg Page

Additional Cast
- Captain Feathersword: Paul Paddick
- Dorothy the Dinosaur: Clare Field, Kelly Hamilton, Lauren Hannaford, Caterina Mete, Emma Watkins, and Bláthnald Conroy Murphy (voice)
- Henry the Octopus: Lauren Hannaford, Caterina Mete, and Jeff Fatt (voice)
- Wags the Dog: Lachlan Gillespie, Nick Hutchinson, Adrian Quinnell and Jeff Fatt (voice)
- Gino the Genie: Simon Pryce
- Alfonso the Chef: Alfonso Rinaldi
- Jonesy the Rooster: Michael Jones
- Dr. Jonny Taitz
- Scottish Dave
