= Caterina Mete =

Australian dancer, singer and choreographer

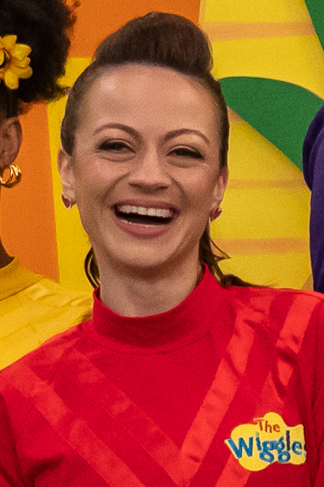
- Mete in 2022

Background information
- Born: 10 September 1980 (age 45); Australia
- Occupations: Dancer; singer; choreographer
- Years active: 2003–present
- Member of: The Wiggles

Caterina Mete (born 10 September 1980) is an Australian dancer, singer, choreographer and children's entertainer who is a member of the children's band the Wiggles.

== Early career ==
Mete began dancing at the age of seven, beginning with tap, jazz and ballroom dancing. Her early employment included cheerleading for the Melbourne Storm.

== The Wiggles ==
In 2003, she became a Wiggly dancer, successfully auditioning to play Dorothy the Dinosaur for the Wiggles in a separate spin-off show. In this role, she caught the attention of the Wiggles and became a regular dancer for the group, performing in recordings and touring with the group to perform in live shows. She also performed choreography for the group, and played a key role in spotting Lachlan Gillespie who became a member of the group.

In 2021, the Wiggles sought to increase diversity in the group by adding four additional supporting members. Shortly after this change Emma Watkins, one of the main group members, left the group. This caused Tsehay Hawkins to be moved into Watkins' role as the Yellow Wiggle, while Mete assumed Hawkins' role as a Red Wiggle.

== Personal life ==
In February 2024, Mete announced her pregnancy with twin girls conceived through IVF with a de-identified donor. On 25 June 2024, she gave birth to identical twin daughters Dolly and Gigi.
