= Lucia Field =

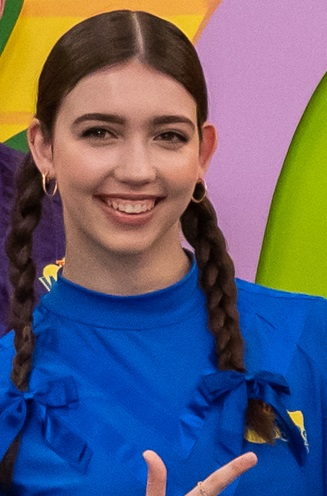
- Field in 2022

Background information
- Born: 2 February 2004 (age 22); Sydney, New South Wales, Australia
- Genres: Children's
- Occupations: Dancer, singer
- Years active: 2021–present
- Member of: The Wiggles

Lucia Field (/luˈtʃiːə/, loo-CHEE-ə; born 2 February 2004) is an Australian children's entertainer, singer, dancer and actress. She is a member of The Wiggles and wears the blue skivvy.

== Early life ==
Field was born in Sydney, Australia to founding Wiggles member Anthony Field and Miki Patisteas.

Field was featured in the Wiggles music videos from a young age, including in the music video for Music Box Dancer in 2006 at two years old.

Field was accepted into The Australian Ballet School at the age of thirteen. Field graduated from The McDonald College in 2021, in the classical ballet stream.

== The Wiggles ==
Field made numerous appearances in Wiggles music videos as a child from 2006 to 2016. Field toured with the group as a backup dancer from 2021 before officially joining the group in July 2022, taking on the role of the secondary blue Wiggle.

Field has focused on teaching Greek to children through the Wiggles. An album dedicated to this venture was released in 2025, with an accompanying full-length YouTube special.

== Personal life ==
In 2024, Field announced a relationship with Wiggles dancer Callum Hendry-Hodsdon.
