= The Wiggles =

Australian children's music group

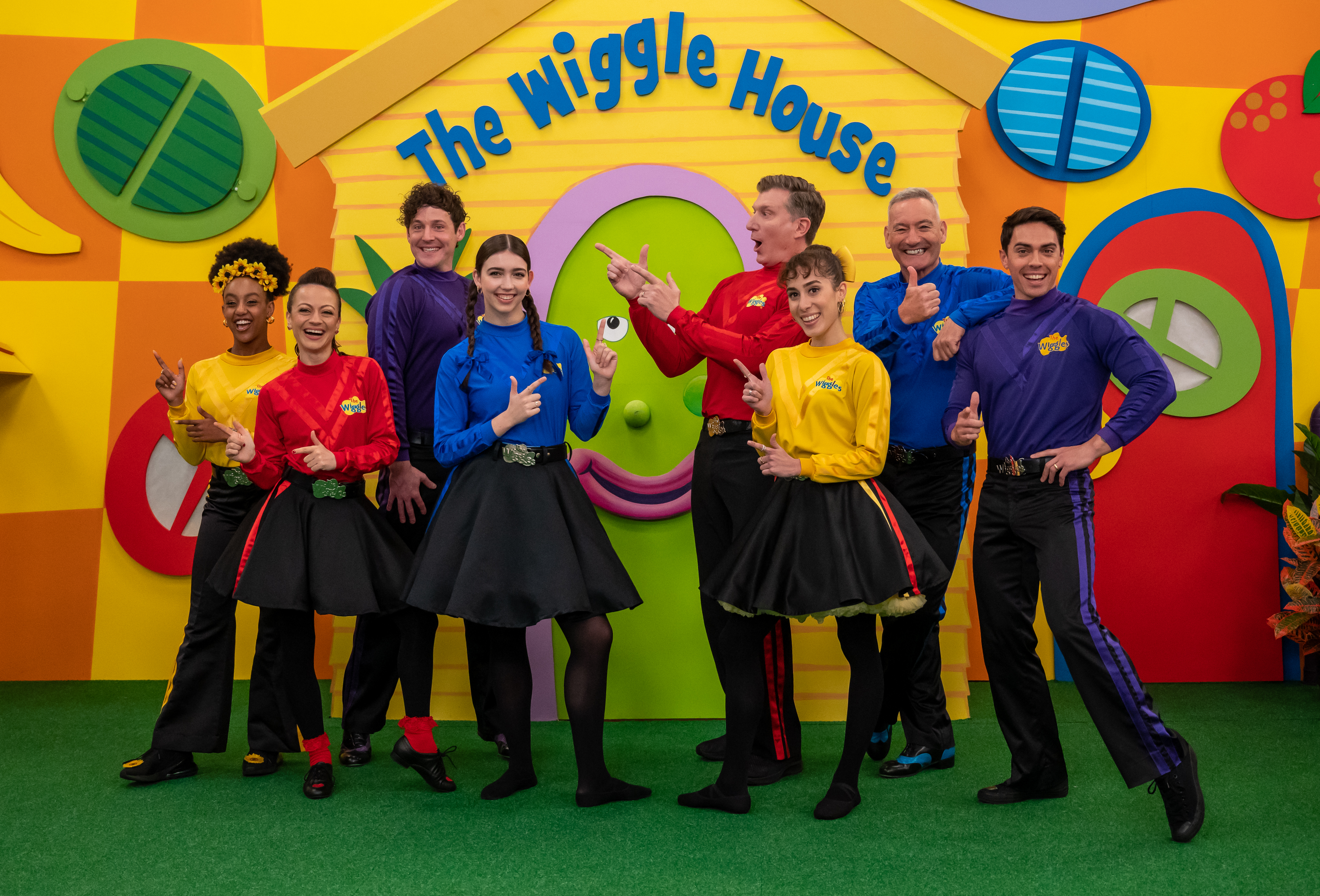
- The Wiggles lineup in 2022 (L–R: Tsehay Hawkins, Caterina Mete, Lachlan Gillespie, Lucia Field, Simon Pryce, Evie Ferris, Anthony Field, John Pearce)

Background information
- Origin: Sydney, New South Wales, Australia
- Genre: Children's
- Works: Discography; songs; videography
- Years active: 1991–present
- Labels: ABC; UMG
- Spinoff of: The Cockroaches
- Members: Anthony Field; Lachlan Gillespie; Simon Pryce; Tsehay Hawkins; Evie Ferris; John Pearce; Caterina Mete; Lucia Field
- Past members: Murray Cook; Jeff Fatt; Greg Page; Phillip Wilcher; Sam Moran; Emma Watkins; Kelly Hamilton
- Website: thewiggles.com

The Wiggles are an Australian children's music group formed in Sydney, New South Wales, Australia in 1991. Since 2022, the group members are Anthony Field, Lachlan Gillespie, Simon Pryce, Tsehay Hawkins, Evie Ferris, John Pearce, Caterina Mete and Lucia Field. The Wiggles were founded in 1991 by Anthony Field, Murray Cook, Jeff Fatt, Greg Page and Phillip Wilcher. Wilcher left the group after their first album. Page retired in 2006 due to ill health and was replaced by understudy Sam Moran, but returned in 2012, replacing Moran. At the end of 2012, Cook, Fatt and Page retired and were replaced by Gillespie, Pryce and Emma Watkins. Cook and Fatt retained their shareholding in the group and continued with Field to have input into its creative and production aspects, while engaging in occasional reunion performances. The group expanded to an eight-member line-up in 2021, at which point Watkins departed.

Field and Fatt were members of the Australian pop band the Cockroaches in the 1980s, and Cook was a member of several bands before meeting Field and Page at Macquarie University, where they were studying to become pre-school teachers. In 1991, Field was inspired to create an album of children's music based upon concepts of early childhood education, and he enlisted Cook, Page, and Fatt to assist him. They began touring to promote the album and became so successful, they quit their teaching jobs to perform full-time. The group augmented their act with costumed characters Dorothy the Dinosaur, Henry the Octopus and Wags the Dog, as well as the human character Captain Feathersword, played by Paul Paddick since 1993. Shirley Shawn the Unicorn was later introduced, as well as the Tree of Wisdom, played by Dominic Field. They originally travelled with a small group of dancers, which later grew into a larger troupe. The group's albums, DVDs and television programs have been produced independently since their inception. The height of their popularity came in the early 2000s, after they broke into the American market.

The group were formally consolidated in 2005. They were listed at the top of Business Review Weekly's top-earning Australian entertainers four years in a row and earned A$45 million in 2009. The Wiggles have enjoyed widespread critical acclaim throughout their history, and their music has been played in pre-schools all over the world. They have earned multiple Gold, Platinum and double Platinum records; have sold 23 million DVDs and 7 million CDs; and have performed, on average, to one million people per year. The band has earned multiple Australasian Performing Right Association (APRA) and Australian Recording Industry Association (ARIA) Music Awards, and they have been inducted into the ARIA Hall of Fame.

== History ==
=== 1988–1991: Background ===
Anthony Field and Jeff Fatt were members of the Cockroaches, a Sydney pop band known for their "good-time R&B material" and several singles recorded by independent labels during the 1980s. In 1988, Field's infant niece, who was the daughter of Cockroaches founder and band member Paul Field, died of SIDS, causing the group to disband. Anthony Field enrolled at Macquarie University in Sydney to complete his degree in early childhood education, and later stated that his niece's death "ultimately led to the formation of [the] Wiggles". Murray Cook, also "a mature-aged student", was the guitarist in the pub rock band Bang Shang a Lang before enrolling at Macquarie. Greg Page, who had been a roadie for and sang with the Cockroaches during their final years, had enrolled in Macquarie to study early childhood education on Field's recommendation. Field, Cook, and Page were among approximately 10 men in a program with 200 students. (Note: Field admitted that one of the things that drew him to teaching was that women outnumbered the men at Macquarie's program.)

In 1991, while still a student, Field became motivated to use concepts in the field of early childhood education to record an album of music for children. The album was dedicated to Field's niece. A song he wrote for the Cockroaches, "Get Ready to Wiggle", inspired the band's name because they thought that wiggling described the way children dance. Like a university assignment, they produced a folder of essays that explained the educational value of each song on the album. They needed a keyboardist "to bolster the rock'n'roll feel of the project", so Field asked his old bandmate Fatt for his assistance in what they thought would be a temporary project. (Note: According to Field, the four original members of the Wiggles, with Page's "mellifluous voice" and "perfect children's music instrument", Cook's knowledge of child development, Fatt's "incredible musicianship and gentle persona" that appealed to children, and Field's energy, balanced each other.)

The group received songwriting help from John Field, Anthony's brother and former bandmate, and from Phillip Wilcher, who was working with the early childhood music program at Macquarie. (Note: Field called Wilcher "a talented musician and composer".) After contributing to their first album, hosting the group's first recording sessions in his Sydney home, and appearing in a couple of the group's first videos, Wilcher left the group and went into classical music. (Note: In 2003, Wilcher claimed that his involvement with the Wiggles had been "virtually erased"; in the late 1990s, they re-recorded their first album, renamed it, and removed all of Wilcher's compositions.) The group reworked a few Cockroaches tunes to better fit the genre of children's music; for example, the Cockroaches song "Hot Tamale", written by John Field, was changed to "Hot Potato". Anthony Field gave copies of their album to his young students to test out the effect of the group's music on children; one mother returned it the next day because her child would not stop listening to it.

"Get Ready to Wiggle"
First recorded in 1991 on the Wiggles' first album, this was originally a Cockroaches tune changed slightly to fit the genre of children's music.

"Do the Monkey"
"Do the Monkey", recorded by the Cockroaches in 1989. With very little changes, it is almost the same as the Wiggles' version, showing how the Wiggles revamped many songs in the Cockroaches' library.

"Do the Monkey"
Originally a Cockroaches tune, one of the many songs in the Cockroaches' library that was changed from Australian pop to children's music

To promote their first album, the Wiggles filmed two music videos with the Australian Broadcasting Corporation (ABC) and created a self-produced, forty-minute-long video version. Finances were limited, so there was no post-production editing of the video project. They used Field's nieces and nephews as additional cast, and hired the band's girlfriends to perform in character costumes. Cook's wife made their first costumes. They used two cameras and visually checked the performance of each song; that way, according to Paul Field, it took them less time to complete a forty-minute video than it took other production companies to complete a three-minute music video.

=== 1991–1993: Early career ===
The Cockroaches' former manager, Jeremy Fabinyi, became the group's first manager. Using their previous connections, he negotiated with the ABC to help them promote their first recording. The album cost approximately A$4,000 to produce and it sold 100,000 copies in 1991. Anthony Field and Cook got teaching jobs, while Page finished his degree, so they could only perform during school holidays; finding time to do so was, as Field reported, "challenging". Fabinyi advised them to tour in unusual settings throughout Sydney and New South Wales. The Wiggles' debut performance was at a friend's daycare facility in Randwick, New South Wales, for about a dozen children. They played for crowds at shopping centres like Westfield in Sydney and at small pre-school events and parties, and busked at Circular Quay, then moved on to regional tours and shows for playgroup associations, averaging about 300 people in the audience. They were promoted by local playgroups or nursing mothers' associations with whom they split their proceeds. They performed at pre-schools with other ABC children's performers; when 500 people attended these concerts just to see the Wiggles, they started doing their own shows, and according to Field, "Suddenly people started rolling up to performances in astonishing numbers".

In 1993, Field, Cook, and Page decided to give up teaching for a year to focus on performing full-time, along with Fatt, to see if they could make a living out of it. As Fatt reported, "it was very much a cottage industry". They used many of the business techniques developed by the Cockroaches, choosing to remain as independent and self-contained as possible. John Field, Mike Conway, who later became the Wiggles' general manager, trumpeter Dominic Lindsay, and Cockroaches saxophonist Daniel Fallon performed with them. (Note: According to Anthony Field, his brother John enjoyed the group's busking performances, but found their pre-school gigs "weird", choosing to contribute by writing and changing the Cockroaches' songs to children's songs.) Anthony Field, with input from the other members, led most of the production of their music, home video releases, and live shows. Their act was later augmented with supporting characters: the "friendly pirate" Captain Feathersword and the costumed characters Dorothy the Dinosaur, Henry the Octopus, and Wags the Dog. These characters were initially performed by the band members themselves: Field played Captain Feathersword and Wags; Cook played Dorothy; and Fatt played Henry. In 1993, actor Paul Paddick permanently joined the group to play Captain Feathersword; he later became known as "the fifth Wiggle" and was as popular as the regular bandmembers. At first, the group travelled with a small group of dancers hired from a local dance studio to perform with them. (Note: By 2006, they toured with two 54-foot trucks that carried equipment and merchandise and three buses that carried 33 cast members, and would employ 25 local crew in each city.)

After the production of their second album, the Wiggles, who were called by their first names when they performed, began to wear costumes on stage as Fabinyi suggested and as the Cockroaches had done, and adopted colour-coded shirts: Page in yellow, Cook in red, Fatt in purple, and Field in blue. The coloured shirts also made it easier for their young audience to identify them. As Field reported, the decision to emphasise colour was "a no-brainer, considering our pre-school-age audience". Cook and Fatt already owned shirts in their colours, but Field and Page "met in a Sydney department store and literally raced to see who got the blue shirt".

=== 1993–2004: Australian and international success ===
Through the rest of the 1990s, the Wiggles maintained a busy recording and touring schedule, becoming as Field reported and despite his strong dislike of touring, "the hardest-working touring act in the country". They released multiple albums and home videos and, depending upon the word of mouth of their audience, performed to increasingly large audiences in Australia and New Zealand despite having to re-introduce themselves to a new audience of children approximately every three years. They produced a new album and video each year and toured to promote them. By late 1993, they "grew bigger than anyone had thought", and hundreds attended their concerts; by 1995 they had set records for music and video sales. In 1997, Twentieth Century Fox produced a feature-length film, The Wiggles Movie, which became the fifth-highest grossing Australian film of 1998, earning over a million-and-a-half dollars.

In spite of their early success in Australia, Paul Field reported that the band was unable to produce a television program on the ABC, where they felt they would receive the most exposure to the pre-school market. "Around 1996–1997", they filmed a television pilot for the ABC, but as The Sydney Morning Herald reported in 2002, "the project never got off the ground due to irreconcilable artistic differences". As a result, the Wiggles financed a TV program of 13 episodes themselves and sold it to Disney Channel in Australia and to Channel Seven, where it became a hit. By 1998, the Wiggles were ready to move on to international markets, despite its members' health issues, especially Anthony Field's. The reaction of producers in the UK was less positive than the group would have liked, although they were eventually able to make inroads there, but their real success came in the US. (Note: Field later said, "For us, America was the goal. It sounds like a cliché, but performing in America was everything we ever wanted to do".) Disney arranged for them to perform at Disneyland in California, where they were discovered by Lyrick Studios, the producers of Barney & Friends. Both Anthony and Paul Field reported that Lyrick, despite their initial misgivings about whether American audiences would accept the band's Australian accents, came to understand the Wiggles and their goals, and after successful tests with American children, enthusiastically promoted them.

The Wiggles used many of the same promotion techniques in the US that they had used in Australia, and chose to keep their concerts simple and maintain the same values that were successful in Australia. The Wiggles performed during the intermission of Barney Live stage shows, which The New York Times likened to "getting the warm-up slot for the Stones" in the pre-school entertainment world. (Note: According to Anthony Field, the Wiggles had to leave their own dinosaur character Dorothy behind, stating tongue in cheek, "Too many dinosaurs on stage can be distracting".) In 2000, when video sales took off in the US, Lyrick began to distribute Wiggles videos and advertised them by including Wiggles shorts as trailers in their Barney videos, which, as Anthony Field stated, "pushed us over the edge". At first, the group's videos were distributed in boutique stores such as FAO Schwarz and Zany Brainy, and on-line. According to Paul Field, they entered the mass media market when their videos became top-sellers at Amazon.com, and their first two videos, Yummy Yummy and Wiggle Time, landed in the top ten at Amazon.com. Stores such as Wal-Mart began to take notice, and began to sell Wiggles videos. The band released nine DVDs in the next three years to keep up with the demand.

As they had done in Australia, the Wiggles chose to tour, but start off small, with simple props and sets instead of hiring a touring company. Some of their first appearances in America were at Blockbuster Video parking lots in 1999 to small audiences—as Fatt said, "a dozen people". They performed at small venues such as church halls and 500-seat theatres in Brooklyn and New Jersey, and upgraded to larger venues as ticket sales increased. Anthony Field reported that one week they would perform to 8,000 in Sydney and to 20 people the following week at a parking lot in a small town in the US. One time, they performed for a dozen people at the Mall of America in Minnesota, but half of the audience were hired by Lyrick. Eventually, they moved to larger arenas such as the Beacon Theatre and Madison Square Garden. They performed at SeaWorld in Orlando, Florida, for six weeks. Their audiences began to increase, and they toured Australia, New Zealand, Hong Kong, the US, and the UK.

The Wiggles' popularity in the US increased "in the shell-shocked weeks after the terrorist attacks on New York City in 2001", when the group performed there, even when other acts cancelled their tours, a decision that earned them loyalty and respect. According to Cook, the press proclaimed that they were braver than many Australian sports teams that had cancelled their appearances. Paul Field stated, "New York has really embraced them. It was a kind of watershed". (Note: The group performed 12 sold-out shows at Madison Square Garden in 2003, and have appeared in the Macy's Thanksgiving Day Parade, the first time in 2001. 1 November 2003 was declared "Wiggles Day" in New York City.) Strong sales of the Wiggles videos eventually caught the attention of Disney Channel in the US, who was impressed by their "strong pro-social message". In January 2002, Disney began showing Wiggles video clips between their programs. By June of that year, the popularity of the clips prompted Disney Channel to add both of the Wiggles' television series to their schedule and showed full episodes multiple times per day. Anthony Field reported that despite their "modest production values", the shows were popular with pre-schoolers.

Beginning in 2002, the Wiggles filmed four series worth of television programs exclusively with the ABC. The network called them "the most successful property that the ABC has represented in the pre-school genre". By the end of 2002, according to Field, "we knew we were involved in something extraordinary in the US". Their concert schedule in North America doubled, seemingly overnight; they began performing up to 520 shows per year all over the world. (Note: By 2011, the group's 20th anniversary, they were performing 350–400 shows a year.) They also began to produce other stage shows in places the Wiggles themselves were unable to visit, in Australia, the UK, and US, that featured their characters, a host, and a few dancers. (Note: Future members Sam Moran hosted and Lachlan Gillespie and Emma Watkins performed in these productions.) The Age called this time period (about the mid-2000s) the group's "high point"; they earned A$45 million a year in revenues, and had several licensing deals and an international distribution agreement with Disney.

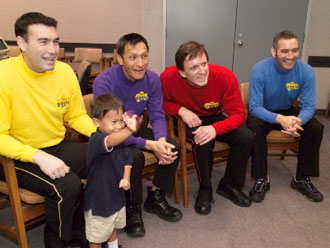
Four of the original Wiggles (and a fan) during a trip to NASA in 2004 (seated from left to right: Greg Page, Jeff Fatt, Murray Cook, and Anthony Field)

Despite their success, Anthony Field almost left the group in 2004, shortly after his marriage and the birth of his first child, due to his serious medical issues, which were worsened by the Wiggles' demanding tour schedule. After meeting chiropractor James Stoxen in Chicago, Field improved his health to the point that he was able to continue. He began to hire teams of chiropractors for himself, his fellow bandmembers, and cast members in every city they performed, which he credited with making it possible for them to fulfill their touring requirements.

=== 2005–2006: Page's retirement ===
In December 2005, lead singer Page, at age 33, underwent a double hernia operation. He withdrew from the Wiggles' US tour in August 2006, after suffering fainting spells, lethargy, nausea, and loss of balance. He returned to Australia, where doctors diagnosed his condition as orthostatic intolerance, a chronic but not life-threatening condition. (Note: The New York Times stated that Page's retirement was similar to John Lennon or Paul McCartney quitting the Beatles.) Page's final performance with the Wiggles was in Kingston, Rhode Island.

On 30 November 2006, the Wiggles announced Page's retirement from the group. In a video message posted on the group's web page, Page said: "I'll miss being a part of the Wiggles very much, but this is the right decision because it will allow me to focus on managing my health". The Sydney Morning Herald called it "unsettling". Page was replaced by Sam Moran, who had served as an understudy for the Wiggles for five years and had already stood in for Page for 150 shows. Initially, the Wiggles struggled over their decision to replace Page, but after their audience's positive response to Moran, they decided to continue as a group because they thought that was what their young audience would want. According to Fatt, who called it "a huge decision" and "a teachable moment" for them, they chose to be honest with their young audience as they made the transition from Page to Moran. As part owner of the Wiggles, Page received a payout of about $20 million.

=== 2006–2012: Moran era ===
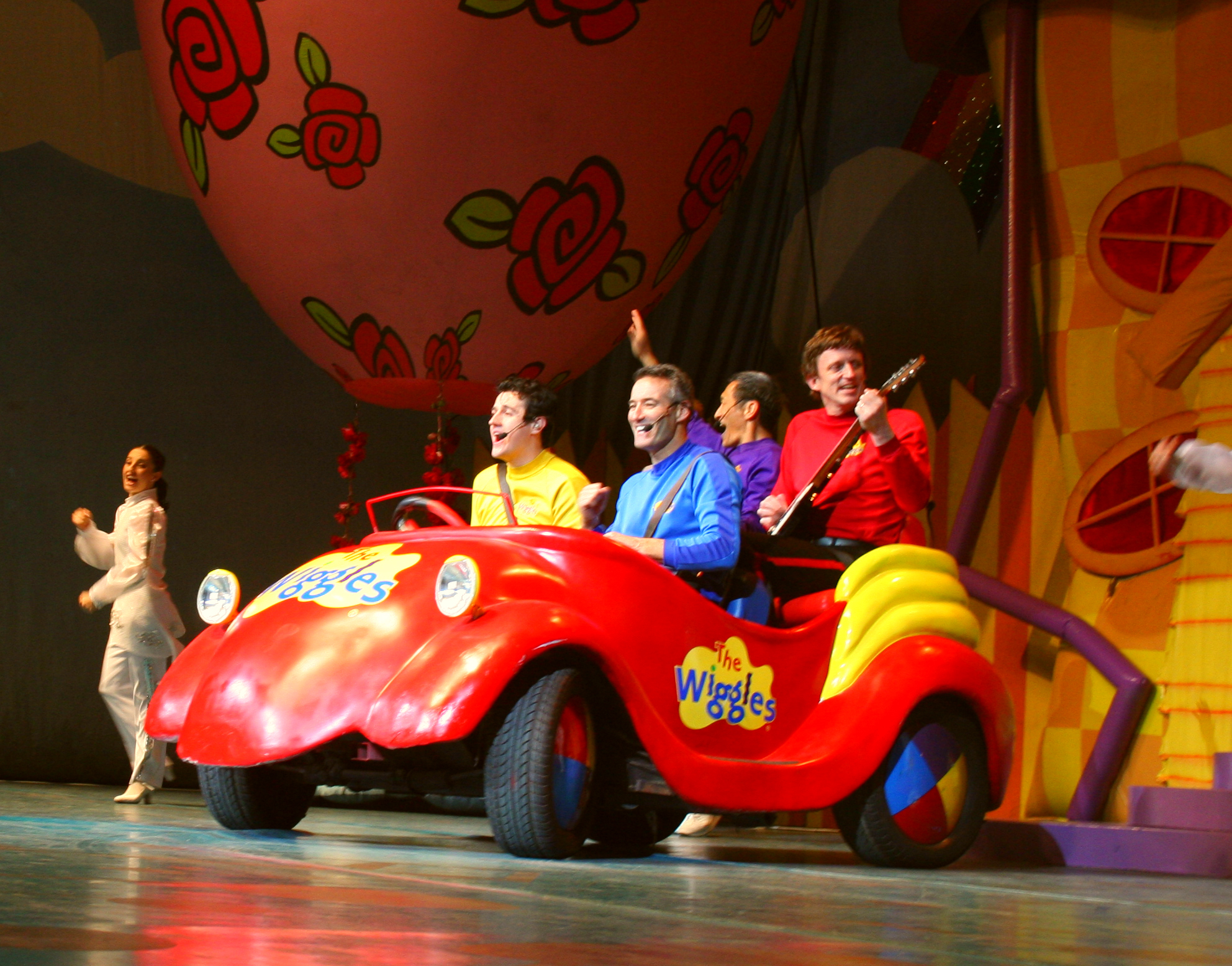
The Wiggles' line-up in 2007, riding in the Big Red Car during a concert

Although Moran's transition as the Wiggles' lead singer was "smooth" for the young children of their audience, it was more difficult for their parents. Moran said that "most children understood". Field reported that by the group's 20th anniversary in 2011, due to the ever-changing nature of their audience, most of their young fans were unfamiliar with Page. Cook stated that Moran's transition was challenging for the group because replacing their lead singer "changed their sound". Fatt characterised Moran's singing style as more operatic, so they chose different keys to sing and perform. The Wiggles never publicly disclosed how much Moran was paid, but it was reported that he earned $200,000 per year. Moran was featured in his first album and video as a member of the group in early 2007, and a new series of the Wiggles' television program featuring Moran was filmed and began airing in Australia.

At the end of 2007, the Wiggles donated their complete back catalogue of 27 master tapes to Australia's National Film and Sound Archive. Their business ventures during these years included opening up "Wiggles World" sections in theme parks in North America and the Arab World, internet offerings, the creation of new television shows, and a five-year-long partnership with the American television network Sprout in 2009. In December 2010, Cinemalive beamed a Wiggles concert live from Acer Arena into movie theatres all over Australia, for children and their families unable to attend their shows.

In early July 2011, Fatt developed arrhythmia and underwent "urgent but routine" heart surgery, when he was fitted with a pacemaker after feeling unwell for several weeks and blacking out. He missed the group's US tour as a result, after not missing a show in 20 years. Also in mid-2011, the Wiggles celebrated their 20th anniversary with circus-themed shows and performances throughout Australia and the outback in a circus tent, as well as a "physically grueling" birthday-themed tour of 90 shows throughout Australia, which Paul Field called "one of the biggest of their careers". Sydney's Powerhouse Museum commemorated the group's anniversary with an exhibit that displayed Wiggles memorabilia.

In 2011, the worldwide financial crisis hit the group, and they recorded their first drop in revenues in 10 years, at approximately $2.5 million, a total decrease of 28 percent. Royalties partially offset the difference between their 2010 and 2011 revenues. Their managing director Mike Conway called 2011 their toughest year financially. For the first time, they had negative equity, with more liabilities than assets, and the owners had to provide the funds for them to continue operations. Conway stated that their losses were due to less touring time in the US, difficulties in placing their DVDs in Walmart, and their required investment in a new digital platform.

=== 2012: Reunion with Page and departure of Cook, Fatt and Page ===
In January 2012, and amidst a great deal of controversy, the Wiggles announced that Page had regained his health and was returning to the group in the place of Moran. He returned as an employee "exactly on the same level as [Moran]", rather than a co-owner, having relinquished his business interest in the group after he left in 2006. According to The Sydney Morning Herald, the band members' interest in Page's return was sparked when they reunited during the group's induction in the ARIA Hall of Fame in November 2011. It was originally planned for Page to remain with the group temporarily until August 2012. Business Review Weekly reported that the presentation of Moran's departure had been mishandled and had potentially damaged their brand image. Paul Field agreed, stating that they "could have handled the communication and management of the transition better". Cook later admitted that they were shocked by the backlash in the press and among the parents of their audience. As part of his severance package, Moran continued to collect song royalties and was granted use of the Wiggles' studios.

In mid-2012, the Wiggles announced that Cook, Fatt and Page would be retiring from touring with the group; Emma Watkins, the first female member of the Wiggles, replaced Page, Lachlan Gillespie replaced Fatt, and Simon Pryce replaced Cook. Anthony Field remained in the group because he found it too difficult to give up and because he still had a passion for educating children. According to Paul Field, staying in the band "was a vital decision to placate American, British and Canadian business partners". Cook, Fatt and Page remained involved with the creative and production aspects of the group. Fatt and Cook had been talking about quitting touring for many years; Cook announced his intention to retire first, citing a desire to spend more time with his family, and then Fatt announced his own retirement shortly thereafter. Page, who was still struggling with his health issues and had stated that his interest was in working with the group's original line-up, was subsequently asked to extend his stay until the end of the year so he would leave alongside Cook and Fatt, to which he agreed.

Cook reported that the original members were confident that the new group would be accepted by the fans because they passed on their founding concepts of early childhood education to Gillespie, Pryce and Watkins. The new members, like Moran (who was not approached to return), were salaried employees. Watkins had previously worked with the group, first performing character roles in 2010, when Anthony Field approached her to join the main line-up. He had initially asked her to tour with the group after being impressed by a behind-the-scenes video she had filmed. Once she had joined the group, Field asked Watkins to dye her hair red, as well as learn how to play the drums. Gillespie had joined the company performing as part of the live shows in 2009, while Pryce had previously worked as a backing vocalist on some of the band's albums.

The group, for their farewell tour, visited eight countries and 141 cities, for a total of almost 250 shows in over 200 days for 640,000 people. Gillespie, Pryce and Watkins wore "in training" T-shirts, and debuted the song "Do the Propeller" during these concerts. The final televised performance of the original band members, along with the new members, was on 22 December 2012, during the annual Carols in the Domain in Sydney. Their final performance, after over 7000 shows over the years, was on 23 December at the Sydney Entertainment Centre. Also by 2012, the Wiggles performed to audiences whose parents attended their shows in their early years, and they were hiring performers who were part of their audience as young children. (Note: One of these performers was Watkins, who appeared along with her sister as an audience member in the Wiggles' first live DVD, Wiggledance!, which was released in 1997.)

=== 2013–2021: "New Wiggles" era ===
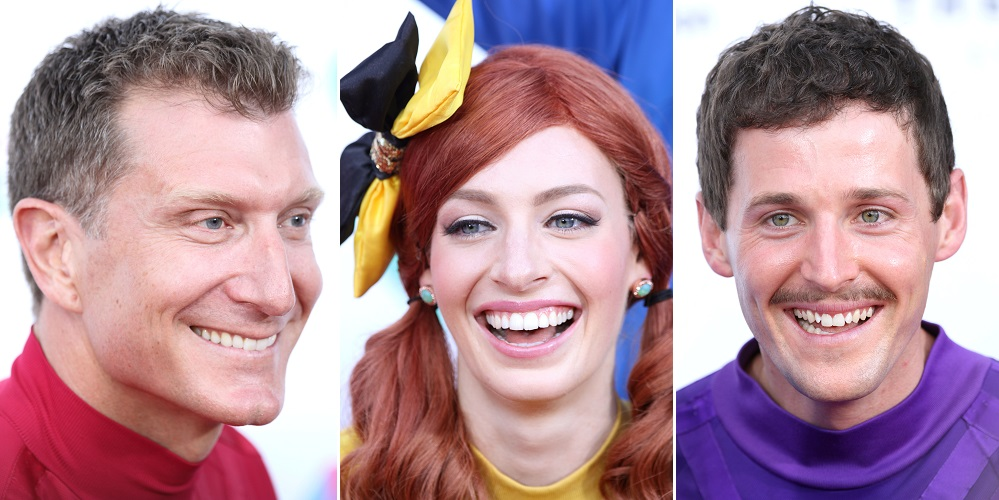
The "New Wiggles": Simon Pryce, Emma Watkins, and Lachlan Gillespie

The new iteration of the Wiggles, with Field and its new members, began touring in early 2013. Cook became the group's road manager in mid-2013. Pryce reported that since the Wiggles' audience changed every few years, the transition to the new group was easier for their young audience than it was for their parents. One of their challenges, especially for their early tours, was learning the Wiggles' catalogue of 1400 songs. After a seven-year absence from Australian television, they filmed a new television series, called Ready, Steady, Wiggle!, in their spare time at their studio in Sydney between tours and on the road. Watkins, who had a film-making degree, played an important role in its production. Field admitted that they found it "hard going" until they returned to television. Merchandise featuring the original group outsold the new group's products, and they failed to sell-out their concerts. By 2014, however, the Wiggles found success with their new line-up, when they doubled their concert ticket sales from the year before, and won the 2014 ARIA Award for Best Children's Album with Apples & Bananas. In 2015, Paul Field called the new group "an amazing success". According to Kathy McCabe of News Corp Australia, it took 18 months for the new group to be accepted by their audience. In 2014, it was announced that the Wiggles would produce their second feature film; comedian Ben Elton was slated to write the script and co-write the soundtrack. It was later shelved as the project could not get significant funding from Screen Australia to produce the film.

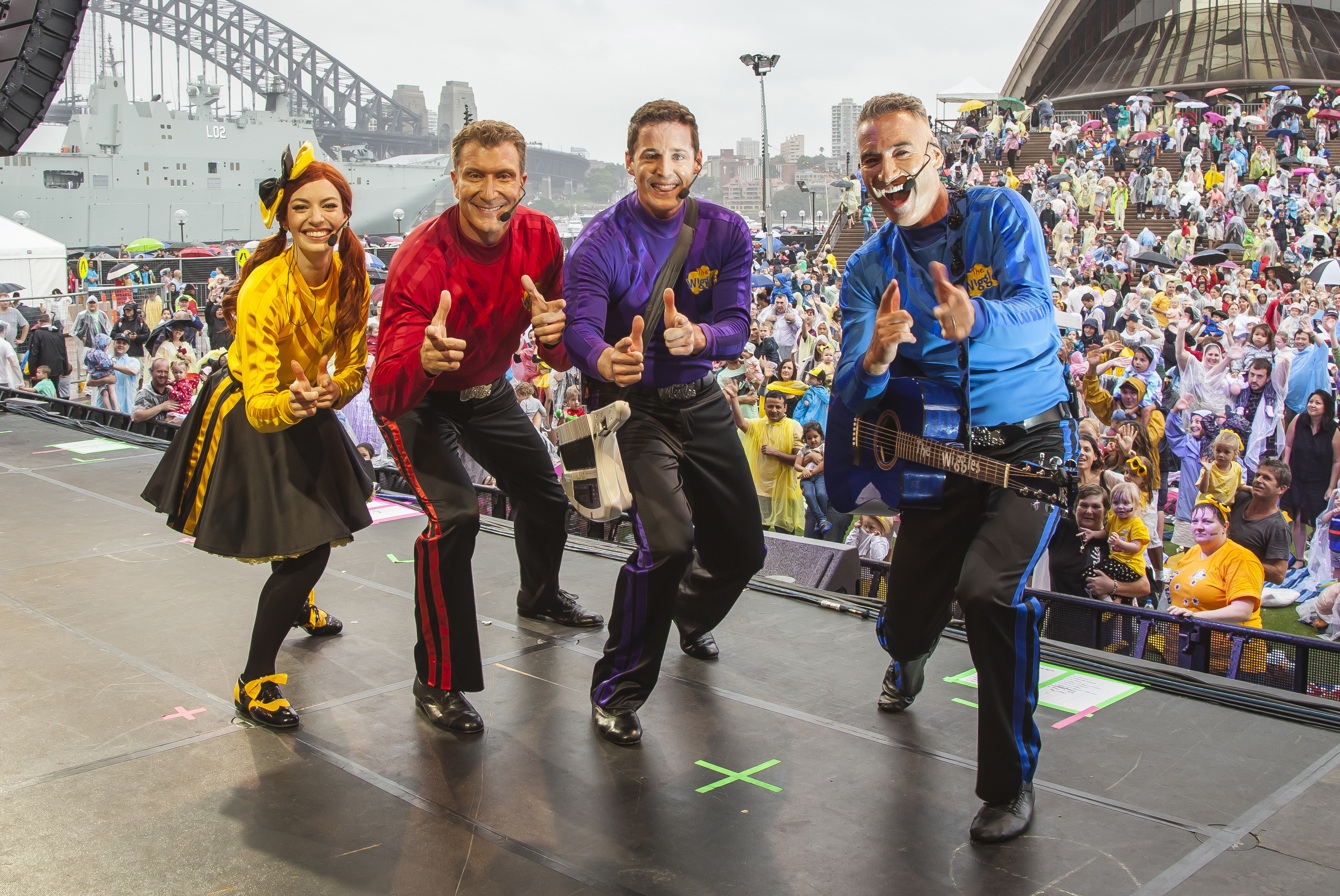
Watkins, Pryce, Gillespie, and Field (L-R) performing live in Sydney, 2018

McCabe credited their success to Watkins, who became the group's stand-out member. According to Field, an American journalist called her young fans, who came to concerts dressed in yellow and wearing bows like her, the "mini Emma army". She was so popular that a new television series, Emma!, featuring Watkins as a solo performer, was produced in 2015. Anthony Field compared Watkins to Elvis Presley, while Paul Field called her "an aspirational role model" for their young audience and reported that she had increased their fan base of girls. Up to 80% of the audience at concerts would emulate her costuming and wear yellow; by 2021 it was estimated that 50% of the group's merchandising was specific to the "Emma" brand. In early 2015, Gillespie and Watkins revealed that they had been dating for two years; they announced their engagement in May 2015. They were married in April 2016, but made public their separation in August 2018.

At first, the members of the new group were salaried employees, but in 2020, Peter Ker of The Australian Financial Review reported that Watkins and Gillespie had each acquired approximately 8% of the company and were given directorships in June 2018; Pryce was the only member who did not have equity in the business. Ker also reported that Anthony Field owned 36%, while Fatt and Cook each owned 24% of the business. A new costumed character, Shirley Shawn the Unicorn, was added in 2019, who was later revealed to identify as non-binary. The COVID-19 pandemic halted the group's capacity to tour in 2020, which led to a downsizing of the company's staff and an increase in filming online content.

Throughout the new members era, the original line-up engaged in occasional reunion performances. In February 2016, the original group members performed a charity concert for an over-18 audience at the Dee Why RSL club in Sydney. The original line-up performed reunion charity concerts on 17 and 18 January 2020 to raise funds for the Australian bush fires with proceeds going to the Australian Red Cross and the WIRES Wildlife Rescue Service. Onstage on 17 January, Page suffered a cardiac arrest; he stopped breathing and required CPR and three jolts from a defibrillator. Page was discharged from hospital the following week. In March 2021, the Wiggles performed on Triple J's Like a Version segment. Cook and Fatt returned alongside Field, Gillespie, Pryce and Watkins to cover Tame Impala's "Elephant" which they interspersed with "Fruit Salad"; the cover reached No. 1 on the annual Triple J Hottest 100 poll for 2021. This was the first cover to top the chart, as well as the first time a children's act had led the ranking.

=== 2021–present: Expanded line-up ===
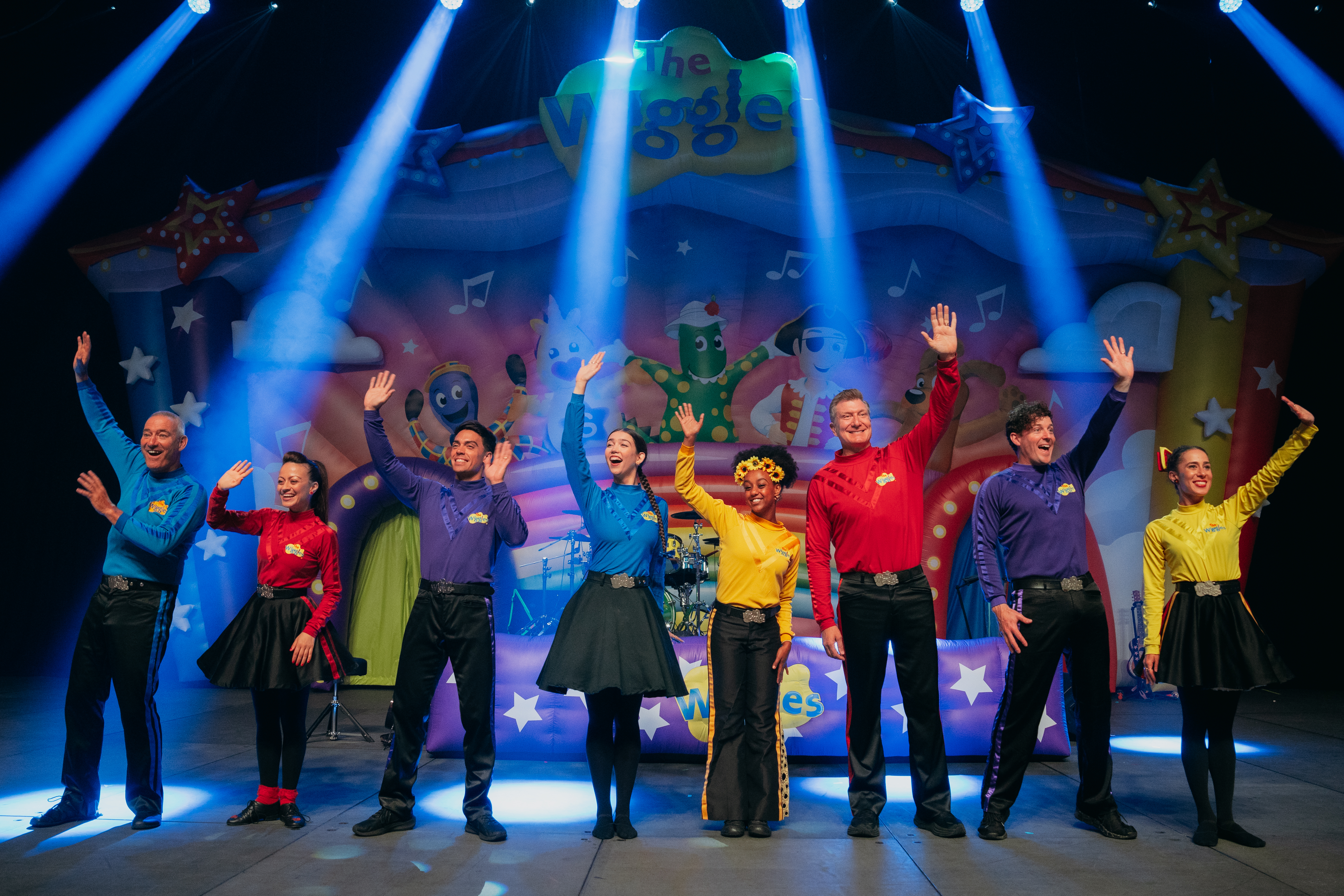
The Wiggles performing live in concert, 2023

The Wiggles commemorated their 30th anniversary in January 2021 with a song entitled "We're All Fruit Salad!", containing lyrics centred around unity and acceptance, and featuring guest performers of different cultural backgrounds, after Field expressed a desire to include more diversity in the band. In August 2021, four new members were added to the Wiggles, with the aim of embracing cultural and gender diversity, and better reflecting contemporary society. Evie Ferris, Kelly Hamilton, Tsehay Hawkins and John Pearce debuted in an exclusive web series entitled Fruit Salad TV, made available on YouTube in September. (Note: Field referred to the primary line-up as the "core four Wiggles" and the supporting members as the "Fruit Salad TV Wiggles".)

Watkins announced her departure from the group in October 2021 and was replaced by Hawkins in the primary line-up; she became the band's first woman of colour. The expanded line-up made their live performance debut as the pre-match entertainment of an Australia women's national soccer team game in November, followed by a national Australian concert tour in early 2022. Caterina Mete, the long-standing choreographer for the Wiggles, joined the group as a member at the commencement of the tour. Field's daughter, Lucia Field, debuted as a member in July 2022, wearing blue like her father; by this point, the group had transitioned to an equal eight-piece line-up. The group made their first appearance on the cover of the Australian edition of Rolling Stone magazine in September, before making history as the first band in Australia to perform two arena tours in one year. A new instalment of the Ready, Steady, Wiggle! television series, the first to feature the expanded line-up, premiered in March 2023; additional series premiered yearly from 2023 to 2026. In the television series, Dominic Field originated the role of the Tree of Wisdom, whose popularity inspired the creation of a short-form spin-off series, album and live tour centred around the character. Videos of Field's dance moves became viral online. Wiggle and Learn, a new web educational series titled, was first made available on YouTube in February 2024, with further episodes released every two weeks throughout the year. A corresponding album, Wiggle and Learn: 100 Educational Songs for Children, was released in August 2024 as the group's 100th album release.

The original line-up continued to perform occasionally during this period. Cook, Fatt, Anthony Field and Page performed an adults-only reunion tour at arenas around Australia in early 2022. They also made contributions to the 2022 tribute album ReWiggled, which debuted at No. 1 on the ARIA Albums Chart and became the group's first number-one album in Australia. ReWiggled was named Best Children's Album at the 2022 ARIA Awards, where the Wiggles were presented with the award for Best Australian Live Act, for their dual tour featuring the group's regular and original members. Members of the original group (minus Cook) were brought on stage by the Kid Laroi for a three-song cameo during his Melbourne concert in June 2022. The original quartet also performed at Falls Festival across Australia in late 2022 and early 2023. A documentary detailing the group's history, entitled Hot Potato: The Story of The Wiggles, premiered in October 2023 on Amazon Prime Video.

The group exited their long-term partnership with ABC Music, who had released all of their previous albums, in February 2026. They subsequently signed a worldwide distribution deal with Universal Music Group, with the intention of expanding the reach of their music globally. The new agreement allocated Universal Music Australia as the distributor for Australian releases, and Republic Records for distribution in the United States.

== Musical style ==
The Wiggles have written new music each year since their inception; they sequestered themselves for a month each summer and wrote three albums' worth of original children's music based on simple concepts familiar to young children, and using several genres of music and types of instruments. Most of their songs were short and started with the chorus because they felt that young children needed to be presented with a song's topic in their first few lines. They wrote songs individually at first, but eventually wrote as a group, often with John Field, trumpet player Dominic Lindsay, and Paddick. Fatt, the only member of the original group without a degree in early childhood education, tended to focus on composing music. Fatt told reporter Brian McElhiney, who called the group's songwriting process "a collaborate affair", that they wrote repetitive pop songs or jingles, which were appealing to children. Watkins reported that she was invited to write songs for their albums, even though she was primarily a dancer. John Fogerty of Creedence Clearwater Revival, who appeared in a Wiggles video in 2004, told The New York Times that he was "very impressed" with the group's songwriting, especially with their drum sound.

According to Anthony Field, the transition from writing music for an adult rock band to writing children's music was not a big one for the Wiggles. He explained that the music of the Cockroaches and the Wiggles was similar, but just featuring different subject matter in the lyrics. Moran stated that the Wiggles wrote songs they liked and would listen to, and then made them appropriate for children. They approached simple and relocatable topics, such as food and nutrition, as teachers would in a pre-school setting, with simple melodies that were easy for children to sing and remember. The group sang the same 60s-style pop as the Cockroaches, but with different lyrics, although they were not confined to songs about love and could write about anything that interested and excited young children, which was limitless. The music they chose to write and perform was influenced by nursery rhymes, folk music, and rock songs of the 1950s and 1960s. Page reported, "First and foremost, we're entertainers". The Wiggles captured the interest of children by first entertaining them, and then by presenting them with educational messages.

The group wrote and performed children's music that was different from what had been done previously; as Cook stated, "we didn't just go down the route of what people think is kids' music". They were not tied to one style or genre of music and often experimented in the studio; while some of their recordings were orchestral, others had a more live feel. The group were aware that their songs were often children's first exposure to music. Guitar Magazine speculated that since Cook was one of the first guitarists children were exposed to, he may be the most influential guitarist in the world. Cook was conscious that he was probably the first guitarist children would see and appreciated the opportunity to inspire children to learn to play guitar later. In 2013, after Cook retired from touring with the group and became their touring manager, he reported that newer bands like Regular John approached him and said that the Wiggles were the first band "they got into".

== Educational theory ==
"Where was the fun? Where were the references to the simple things that are so dominant in a child's life? Favourite books, colours, dancing, playing, nap time. And what's wrong with kids getting up and grooving; squealing, screaming, and laughing through a performance? I wanted to explore alternate ways to write and perform for young children, to ensure the music was for them, not just the musician. Nothing complicated, snide, or condescending".

— Anthony Field, 2012, speaking about the state of children's music in the early 1990s

The Wiggles' songwriting and performances were rooted in their professional training as pre-school teachers and in the concepts of early childhood education. Field reported, as he studied music for young children at university, being "shocked ... at the non-inclusive way music for children was usually performed". According to Field, children had to sit silently as musicians played "traditional songs often featuring negative or outdated lyrics and dealing with subject matter of no interest to small children". The lack of songs with themes and topics that interested children inspired Field to record the Wiggles' first album.

The group's "golden rule", according to Field, was to make the content of their songs and shows "developmentally appropriate and fun". Their music, stage shows, and television and DVD productions were developed, as The New York Times reported, "from the premise that a young child has a short attention span, is curious about a limited number of objects and activities, loves having a job to do and is thrilled by mastering basic movements". They also respected their audience's intelligence and insight about entertainment, information and honesty. As Field said, "Young children identify with relevant concepts, and enjoy being entertained and being part of the entertainment. They are willing to commit to interacting if you are direct, inclusive, and positive". The group understood that challenging young children to engage in difficult tasks is more effective than simply telling them to do it. They believed that young children were egocentric, so they stared continually into the camera in their videos and TV shows, and explained every action because they believed that young children needed to be told what to expect so that they do not feel left out and in order to feel safe.

"We have a license to be silly, and a lot of what we do is about joy".

— Murray Cook, 2010

The Wiggles' stage shows are full of action and audience participation. By the group's "New Wiggles" iteration, they featured inside jokes for the adult members of their audience and the bandmembers tended to wander throughout the audience. Pryce, as an experienced stage performer, was conscious that their shows were the first live theatre young children experienced; as a result, the group adapted the content of their shows to accommodate their audience's development and understanding. Paddick's role as Captain Feathersword became more important in the mid-1990s, especially in the group's stage shows, when he was able to incorporate his circus and opera training, as well as impersonations that were popular with their audience's parents.

They believed in empowering children by practices such as greeting their audience members with "Hello, everyone", instead of "Hello, boys and girls" which, as Paul Field explains, "unnecessarily separates children and has undertones of condescension". Kathleen Warren, the band members' former professor at Macquarie University, believed that the group's practice of asking their audience to "Wake Up Jeff" when Fatt pretended to fall asleep was "very much in keeping with the way they work with children". (Note: Warren has been a consultant for the Wiggles since Field, Cook, and Page were her students at Macquarie University.) Warren stated that asking children to interrupt Fatt's slumber helped them build confidence and to feel more in control of their lives. Fatt was the only original member of the Wiggles without a background in early childhood education; he explained that was the reason falling asleep was chosen as his gimmick and that "it was a way of getting me involved in the shows without actually having to do anything". Paul Field reported that children in the Wiggles' audience felt "great excitement" and were disappointed if not given the opportunity to help Jeff in this way. Anthony Field, who called it "a simple audience participation and interaction gag we've done since the start of the group", claimed that it endeared Fatt to their audiences. The group's members took turns falling asleep in the early days of the group, but it became Fatt's gimmick because "it was a perfect fit". When Fatt retired, Gillespie took over the task of falling asleep.

Simple movements were developed by their choreographers, including Leeanne Ashley, to accompany each song because, as The New York Times reported, they believed "in the power of basic movements to enchant young children". According to reporter Anders Wright, they intentionally made mistakes in their dance moves in order to identify more with their young audience. The group incorporated more dancing into their performances after the birth of Field's oldest daughter in 2004. In later years, corresponding with Field's developing interests in acrobatics and gymnastics, they added these elements to their stage shows, including, as Field reported, hiring several world-class athletes such as former trampoline champion Karl Shore. Watkins, whom Paul Field called "a dancer of many disciplines", was initially hired as a member of their troupe and referred to herself as "mainly a dancer".

Between 1999 and 2003, to test the group's appeal across cultures, Warren used one of the Wiggles' CDs as an educational tool in a village near Madang, on the north coast of Papua New Guinea. She found that the Madangese children were able to relate to the group's songs, and that they were able to sing along and participate in their simple choreography. Although the Wiggles' recorded and performed songs, dances, and musical styles from different cultures and languages, the Wiggles did not find that adapting their music to non-Australian cultures was necessary to reach children in other countries. The Wiggles recognised that as long as they spoke at the same level as their audience, their Australian accents would not matter, and that young children were able to adapt to a variety of contexts and to different pronunciations of common words, no matter where they resided.

== Brand and finances ==
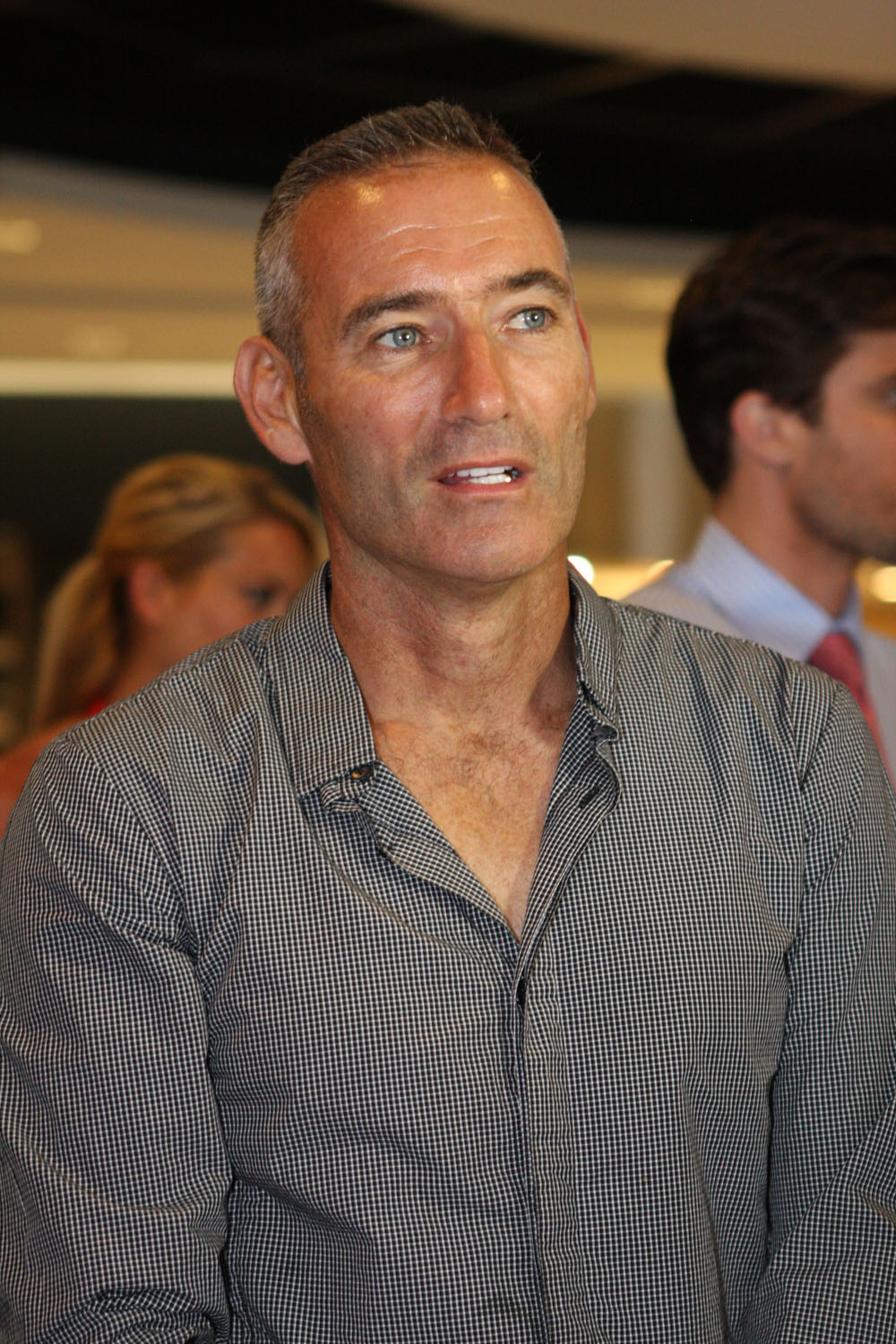
Anthony Field (pictured here in 2012) was instrumental in developing the Wiggles' business model.

Throughout the group's history, the members and management have retained full creative control and ownership of every aspect of their business in an effort to remain as independent as possible. As Field stated, the band's corporation was "not your regular 'corporate culture'". The group does not have a chief executive, (Note: However, Anthony Field became the majority shareholder of the brand in 2018.) instead making decisions through consensus and made business decisions based upon their experience as performers and their knowledge of early childhood education. Endorsements of toys and other products are made carefully and only with products that correlated with their image. There are high expectations regarding the behaviour and attitude of everyone associated with the group, although in 2021, Watkins denied the existence of "a Wiggles code-of-conduct manual hidden away somewhere". Other ventures of band's corporation included franchising their concept to Africa, South America, and Taiwan. The group also licensed "Wiggles World" sections to various theme parks in the United States and Australia, as well as play centres in both regions.

The Wiggles became formally consolidated in 2005. The group's board of directors consisted of the original three members, as well as Paul Field, who had been the manager of the group since the mid-1990s, and Mike Conway, who had worked for Ernst & Young in England and became a co-manager in 2001. It was reported that as part owner of the Wiggles, Page was given a A$20 million payout when he left the group in 2006; he officially ceased to be a company shareholder in 2008. After their retirement in 2012, Cook and Fatt, as well as Anthony Field, each retained 30% ownership of the brand, and Paul Field and Conway each owned 5%. Gillespie, Pryce and Watkins were reported to be salaried employees when they joined the group in 2012. Paul Field departed as the company's general manager in March 2020, in the midst of a period of "organisational change". It was reported through corporate filings that Watkins and Gillespie each acquired approximately 8% ownership of the business as well as company directorships in June 2018, while Pryce had not gained equity of the group (though he was later reported as the chairman of the brand's board). At the time of reporting, it was suggested that Anthony Field owned 36% of the brand, becoming the majority shareholder, while Fatt and Cook each owned 24%. By 2021, it was estimated that the group earned A$30 million per year. Luke O'Neill was appointed as the brand's first CEO in January 2024; he was succeeded by Kate Chiodo.

== Reception ==
The Wiggles have enjoyed "almost universal approval" throughout their history. Their songs have been sung and played in pre-schools around the world. Between 2000 and 2010, the Wiggles earned 21 Gold records. The group's albums have been certified by ARIA as double Platinum, Platinum and Gold in Australia, as well as certified Gold in the US. The original group performed, on average, to one million people per year. The Wiggles' music has also received over one billion streams on digital services. In 2014, The Sydney Morning Herald called their shows slick and fast-paced.

After 2003, front-row tickets to their sold-out concerts in the US were scalped for US$500. The group responded by reducing the number of seats sold per transaction, in order to keep prices down and avoid further tickets scalping. In 2008, the group found themselves in the midst of what The Daily Telegraph called a "ticketing scandal"; scalpers tried to sell an A$19 ticket on eBay for almost A$2,000 and a set of three tickets for A$315 for concerts in Melbourne, and a group of three tickets to a Wiggles UNICEF charity concert in Sydney had a price tag of A$510. The tickets were taken off eBay and voided.

In what Paul Field called "one of the highlights of their 15 years of being together", The Wiggles were awarded an honorary doctorate degree from Australian Catholic University in 2006. Cook gave an address during the private ceremony honouring them. They were awarded another honorary doctoral degree in 2009 from their alma mater, Macquarie University. The group were named UNICEF goodwill ambassadors in 2008; they held a special concert to raise money for the organisation. In 2010, the four original members of the Wiggles were appointed Members of the Order of Australia for their service to the arts in Australia, especially children's entertainment, and for their contributions and support of several charities. They called the honour their "biggest recognition yet". The group has always invited children with special needs and their families to pre-concert "meet and greet" sessions. According to Fatt, many parents of these children have reported that the Wiggles' music has enhanced their lives, and that children with autism "respond to [the] Wiggles and nothing else". The Wiggles, throughout their history, have visited and performed for patients at the Sydney Children's Hospital every Christmas morning.

=== Controversies ===
In 2020, a song released six years earlier titled "Pappadum" received significant backlash for its portrayal of Indian culture. The song's lyrics are the word pappadum repeated over and over again, and the accompanying music video sees the Wiggles dancing in traditional Indian style whilst wearing sarees, dhotis and waving pappadums about. Member Anthony Field, who wrote the song, issued an apology stating that he wrote it as a celebration of Indian culture. The song has since been removed from live concerts.

In 2021, Australian senator Matt Canavan of the National Party accused the Wiggles of going "woke", following the group's introduction of several new ethnically diverse members. Canavan stated that "the Wiggles are free to do what they like. It was nice while it lasted. But you go woke, you go broke". His comments were largely criticised by fans welcoming the changes.

In 2023, the Australian city of Bunbury, Western Australia played the song Hot Potato on loop to deter homeless people from congregating at a popular outdoor shelter area. In a statement, the Wiggles said they were "deeply disappointed" to hear that their music was being used for this purpose. The city subsequently turned off the song after the band approached it.

== Members ==
Current members

- Anthony Field – Blue Wiggle (1991–present)
- Lachlan Gillespie – Purple Wiggle (2013–present)
- Simon Pryce – Red Wiggle (2013–present)
- Tsehay Hawkins – Yellow Wiggle (2021–present), Red Wiggle (2021)
- Evie Ferris – Yellow Wiggle (2022–present), Blue Wiggle (2021–2022)
- John Pearce – Purple Wiggle (2021–present)
- Caterina Mete – Red Wiggle (2022–present)
- Lucia Field – Blue Wiggle (2022–present)

Former members

- Murray Cook – Red Wiggle (1991–2012) (Note: Cook also performed at reunion shows and as a guest performer between 2016 and 2024.)
- Jeff Fatt – Purple Wiggle (1991–2012) (Note: Fatt also performed at reunion shows and as a guest performer between 2016 and 2023.)
- Greg Page – Yellow Wiggle (1991–2006, 2012) (Note: Page also performed at reunion shows and as a guest performer between 2016 and 2024.)
- Phillip Wilcher (1991–1992) (Note: Wilcher never had a signature colour, as he left the group before they adopted coloured shirts.)
- Sam Moran – Yellow Wiggle (2006–2012)
- Emma Watkins – Yellow Wiggle (2013–2021)
- Kelly Hamilton – Yellow Wiggle (2021–2022)

== Discography ==
Studio albums

- The Wiggles (1991)
- Here Comes a Song (1992)
- Stories and Songs: The Adventures of Captain Feathersword the Friendly Pirate (1993)
- Yummy Yummy (1994)
- Big Red Car (1995)
- Wake Up Jeff! (1996)
- Wiggly, Wiggly Christmas (1996)
- The Wiggles Movie Soundtrack (1997)
- Toot Toot! (1998)
- It's a Wiggly Wiggly World (2000)
- Wiggle Time! (2000)
- Yule Be Wiggling (2000)
- Hoop Dee Doo: It's a Wiggly Party (2001)
- Wiggly Safari (2002)
- Wiggle Bay (2002)
- Go to Sleep Jeff! (2003)
- Whoo Hoo! Wiggly Gremlins! (2003)
- Top of the Tots (2003)
- Cold Spaghetti Western (2004)
- Santa's Rockin'! (2004)
- Sailing Around the World (2005)
- Here Comes the Big Red Car (2006)
- It's Time to Wake Up Jeff! (2006)
- Splish Splash Big Red Boat (2006)
- Racing to the Rainbow (2006)
- Getting Strong! (2007)
- Pop Go the Wiggles! (2007)
- You Make Me Feel Like Dancing (2008)
- Sing a Song of Wiggles (2008)
- Go Bananas! (2009)
- Hot Poppin' Popcorn (2009)
- Let's Eat (2010)
- Ukulele Baby! (2011)
- It's Always Christmas with You! (2011)
- Surfer Jeff (2012)
- Taking Off! (2013)
- Furry Tales (2013)
- Pumpkin Face (2013)
- Go Santa Go! (2013)
- Apples & Bananas (2014)
- Wiggle House (2014)
- Rock & Roll Preschool (2015)
- Meet the Orchestra! (2015)
- Wiggle Town! (2016)
- Carnival of the Animals (2016)
- Dance Dance! (2016)
- Nursery Rhymes (2017)
- Duets (2017)
- Wiggly, Wiggly Christmas! (2017)
- Nursery Rhymes 2 (2018)
- Wiggle Pop! (2018)
- Big Ballet Day! (2019)
- Party Time! (2019)
- Fun and Games (2020)
- Choo Choo Trains, Propeller Planes & Toot Toot Chugga Chugga Big Red Car! (2020)
- Lullabies with Love (2021)
- Halloween Party (2021)
- ReWiggled (2022) (with various artists)
- Super Wiggles (2022)
- Ready, Steady, Wiggle! (2023)
- The Sound of Halloween (2023)
- The Sound of Christmas (2023)
- Wiggle and Learn: 100 Educational Songs for Children (2024)
- Wiggle Up, Giddy Up! (2025)

== Awards and nominations ==
List of awards and nominations received by The Wiggles
Award	Year	Recipient(s) and nominee(s)	Category	Result	Ref.
AIR Awards	2020	Party Time!	Best Independent Children's Album or EP	Nominated	
AIR Awards	2021	Choo Choo Trains, Propeller Planes & Toot Toot Chugga Chugga Big Red Car!	Best Independent Children's Album or EP	Nominated	
AIR Awards	2022	Lullabies with Love	Best Independent Children's Album or EP	Won	
AIR Awards	2023	ReWiggled	Best Independent Children's Album or EP	Nominated	
AIR Awards	2023	ABC Music, The Orchard: The Wiggles – ReWiggled	Independent Marketing Team of the Year	Nominated	
AIR Awards	2023	RPM, Bec Brown Communications: – The Wiggles: ReWiggled	Independent Publicity Team of the Year	Nominated	
AIR Awards	2024	Ready, Steady, Wiggle!	Best Independent Children's Album or EP	Nominated	
AIR Awards	2025	The Wiggles Sound System: Rave of Innocence	Best Independent Children's Album or EP	Nominated	
AIR Awards	2026	The Tree of Wisdom	Best Independent Children's Album or EP	Nominated	
APRA Music Awards	1994	"Hot Potato"	Children's Composition of the Year	Won	
APRA Music Awards	1994	"The Monkey Dance"	Children's Composition of the Year	Nominated	
APRA Music Awards	1995	"Can You (Point Your Finger and Do the Twist?)"	Most Performed Children's Work	Won	
APRA Music Awards	1995	"Nicky Nacky Nocky Noo"	Most Performed Children's Work	Nominated	
APRA Music Awards	1996	"Wake Up Jeff"	Most Performed Children's Work	Won	
APRA Music Awards	1999	"Captain Feathersword Fell Asleep on His Pirate Ship"	Most Performed Children's Work	Won	
APRA Music Awards	1999	"We're Dancing With Wags the Dog"	Most Performed Children's Work	Nominated	
APRA Music Awards	2003	"Lights, Camera, Action, Wiggles!"	Best Music for Children's Television	Nominated	
APRA Music Awards	2007	The Wiggles	Most Performed Screen Composer – Overseas	Won	
APRA Music Awards	2007	The Wiggles	International Achievement Award	awarded	
APRA Music Awards	2022	The Wiggles	Ted Albert Award for Outstanding Services to Australian Music	awarded	
ARIA Music Awards	1995	Big Red Car	Best Children's Album	Won	
ARIA Music Awards	1996	Wake Up Jeff!	Best Children's Album	Won	
ARIA Music Awards	1998	Toot Toot!	Best Children's Album	Won	
ARIA Music Awards	2000	It's a Wiggly Wiggly World!	Best Children's Album	Nominated	
ARIA Music Awards	2001	Hoop-Dee-Doo! It's a Wiggly Party	Best Children's Album	Nominated	
ARIA Music Awards	2002	Wiggly Safari	Best Children's Album	Nominated	
ARIA Music Awards	2003	Whoo Hoo! Wiggly Gremlins!	Best Children's Album	Nominated	
ARIA Music Awards	2003	Go to Sleep Jeff!	Best Children's Album	Nominated	
ARIA Music Awards	2003	The Wiggles	Outstanding Achievement Award	awarded	
ARIA Music Awards	2004	Top of the Tots	Best Children's Album	Nominated	
ARIA Music Awards	2005	Live Hot Potatoes!	Best Children's Album	Won	
ARIA Music Awards	2006	Racing to the Rainbow	Best Children's Album	Won	
ARIA Music Awards	2007	Pop Go the Wiggles!	Best Children's Album	Won	
ARIA Music Awards	2008	You Make Me Feel Like Dancing	Best Children's Album	Won	
ARIA Music Awards	2009	Go Bananas!	Best Children's Album	Won	
ARIA Music Awards	2010	Let's Eat	Best Children's Album	Won	
ARIA Music Awards	2011	Ukulele Baby!	Best Children's Album	Won	
ARIA Music Awards	2011	The Wiggles	ARIA Hall of Fame	Inducted	
ARIA Music Awards	2012	Surfer Jeff	Best Children's Album	Won	
ARIA Music Awards	2013	Taking Off!	Best Children's Album	Nominated	
ARIA Music Awards	2014	Apples & Bananas	Best Children's Album	Won	
ARIA Music Awards	2015	Rock & Roll Preschool	Best Children's Album	Nominated	
ARIA Music Awards	2016	Wiggle Town	Best Children's Album	Won	
ARIA Music Awards	2017	Duets	Best Children's Album	Nominated	
ARIA Music Awards	2017	Och Aye the G'nu (with Jimmy Barnes)	Best Children's Album	Won	
ARIA Music Awards	2018	Wiggle Pop!	Best Children's Album	Nominated	
ARIA Music Awards	2019	Party Time!	Best Children's Album	Nominated	
ARIA Music Awards	2020	Choo Choo Trains, Propeller Planes & Toot Toot Chugga Chugga Big Red Car!	Best Children's Album	Nominated	
ARIA Music Awards	2021	Lullabies with Love	Best Children's Album	Nominated	
ARIA Music Awards	2022	ReWiggled	Best Children's Album	Won	
ARIA Music Awards	2022	The OG Wiggles Reunion / Fruit Salad TV Big Show Tour	Best Australian Live Act	Won	
ARIA Music Awards	2023	Ready, Steady, Wiggle!	Best Children's Album	Nominated	
ARIA Music Awards	2024	Wiggle and Learn: 100 Educational Songs for Children	Best Children's Album	Nominated	
ARIA Music Awards	2025	Wiggle Up, Giddy Up!	Best Children's Album	Nominated	
ARIA Music Awards	2026	Sparkle! A Circus of Lights	Best Children's Album	Pending	
Logie Awards	2003	Lights, Camera, Action, Wiggles!	Most Outstanding Children's Program	Nominated	
Logie Awards	2024	Hot Potato: The Story of The Wiggles	Best Factual or Documentary Program	Nominated	
Mo Awards	2004	The Wiggles	Best Children Show	Won	
Rolling Stone Australia Awards	2023	The Wiggles	Rolling Stone Global Award	Nominated	
Rolling Stone Australia Awards	2023	ReWiggled	Best Record	Nominated	
