= Tsehay Hawkins =

Australian dancer and singer (born 2005)

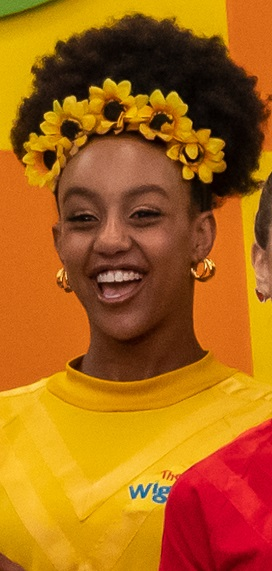
- Hawkins in 2022

Background information
- Born: 15 November 2005 (age 21); Addis Ababa, Ethiopia
- Origin: Bargo, New South Wales, Australia
- Genres: Children's, Latin
- Occupations: Dancer, singer
- Years active: 2017–present
- Member of: The Wiggles

Tsehay Hawkins (/səˈhaɪ/, sə-HYE; born 15 November 2005) is an Australian dancer and singer, best known as a member of the Wiggles. She was the second female to be a member of the group and is the first member of African heritage, as well as the youngest to have ever joined, joining at age fifteen.

== Early life ==
Tsehay Hawkins was born in Addis Ababa, Ethiopia, on 15 November 2005. She was adopted by Australian parents, Robyn and Reg Hawkins, when she was 5 months old and raised in Bargo, 95 kilometres (59 mi) south-west of Sydney. From two years old, Hawkins started taking ballet, tap and jazz dance lessons and later followed with Ethiopian and West African styles. Her family also adopted a child from Colombia in 2012, as Hawkins wished for a younger sibling. After her sibling's adoption, Hawkins took cumbia dance lessons in Sydney and expanded her repertoire to salsa and urban Latin dance styles. As of October 2021, she was attending secondary school in Campbelltown.

== Early career ==
Hawkins won a national dance competition in January 2017. She appeared on Australian variety TV show, Little Big Shots in 2018 as an African fusion dancer. At the 2019 World Salsa championships she won Youth Salsa Soloist, Youth Mixed Latin Soloist, and Youth/Adult Mixed Latin Couples & Duets (partnered with Oliver Pineda). In early 2021, Hawkins won the World Amateur Ladies Salsa and Urban Latin Championship. She has won four world titles in Latin and commercial dance.

== The Wiggles ==
Hawkins became an auxiliary member of the Wiggles' Fruit Salad TV YouTube series in August 2021 alongside Evie Ferris (blue), Kelly Hamilton (yellow) and John Pearce (purple). Anthony Field eventually hired the auxiliary members, thinking "children who are watching the show today come from culturally diverse families, so [he] wanted the Wiggles to reflect their audience". In October of that year, yellow Wiggle Emma Watkins announced that she was retiring from the Wiggles at the end of the year.

Hawkins took Watkins' role as the yellow Wiggle in 2022. At age 16, Hawkins surpassed Greg Page (age 19) as the youngest person to join the Wiggles.

== Personal life ==
Hawkins resides with her family in Bargo, New South Wales.

Hawkins is a supporter of the Canterbury-Bankstown Bulldogs in the NRL.

== Awards ==
While the group were in hiatus from live performances, Hawkins, with the Wiggles members, presented the Best Australian Live Act trophy at the 2021 ARIA Music Awards.
