= Wake Up Jeff! =

1996 studio album/video by The Wiggles

Studio album by the Wiggles
- Released: April 1996 (AUS); 12 December 2000 (USA)
- Recorded: 1995–1996
- Genre: Children's music
- Length: 35:10 (AUS); 30:08 (USA)
- Labels: ABC Music (AUS); Lyrick / Koch Records (USA)
- Producer: The Wiggles

The Wiggles chronology
Big Red Car (1995)	Wake Up Jeff! (1996)	Wiggly, Wiggly Christmas (1996)

Wake Up Jeff! is the sixth album by Australian band the Wiggles, released in 1996 by ABC Music distributed by EMI. It won the ARIA Award for Best Children's Album in 1996.

== Track list ==
=== AUS track list ===
All tracks are written by (or trad arr. by) M Cook/J Fatt/A Field/G Page, except listed below.

No.	Title	Writer(s)	Length
1.	"We Like to Say Hello"		1:58
2.	"Henry's Underwater Big Band"	John Field	2:31
3.	"Statue" (spoken)		0:09
4.	"Everybody is Clever"		1:59
5.	"Swim, Swim, Swim" (spoken)		0:08
6.	"Having Fun at the Beach"		1:46
7.	"Food Wish" (spoken)		0:16
8.	"Bing Bang Bong (That's a Pirate Song)"	John Field, Cook, Fatt, Field, Page	1:21
9.	"Bucket of Dew/Paddy Condon from Cobar (Note: "Bucket of Dew / Paddy Condon from Cobar" is based on the traditional Irish folk song "The Rare Old Mountain Dew". The subtitle "Paddy Condon from Cobar" is a reference to Anthony's great-grandfather Paddy Condon who owned a pub in the mining town of Cobar in western New South Wales. - Field, Anthony; Truman, Greg (2012). How I Got My Wiggle Back: A Memoir of Healing. Hoboken, New Jersey: John Wiley & Sons. p. 220. ISBN 978-1-118-01933-7.)"		1:43
10.	"Guess What?"		1:43
11.	"Wake Up Jeff!"		1:26
12.	"A Frog Went A Walking"		1:29
13.	"Dorothy, Would You Like to Dance?"		1:52
14.	"Take a Trip Out on the Sea"		1:09
15.	"Romp Bomp a Stomp"		1:27
16.	"Whales" (spoken)		0:08
17.	"Baby Beluga"	Raffi, Debi Pike	2:23
18.	"Chu-Lu-Lu"	trad arr. Cook, Fatt, Field, Page; English lyrics by Elizabeth Mansutti	0:51
19.	"Name Game"		1:05
20.	"I Can Do So Many Things"		1:35
21.	"Wave to Wags"	John Field, Cook, Fatt, Field, Page	1:42
22.	"House on the Hillside"		1:15
23.	"Havenu Shalom Alechem"		1:12
24.	"Quacking Sounds" (spoken)		0:10
25.	"Five Little Ducks"		2:00
26.	"Windmills"		1:01
27.	"Pipers Waltz"		1:27

=== US track list ===
All tracks are written by (or trad arr. by) Murray Cook, Jeff Fatt, Anthony Field, Greg Page, except listed below.

No.	Title	Writer(s)	Length
1.	"We Like to Say Hello"		1:58
2.	"Henry's Underwater Big Band"	John Field	2:31
3.	"Statue" (spoken)		0:09
4.	"Swim, Swim, Swim" (spoken)		0:08
5.	"Having Fun at the Beach"		1:46
6.	"Food Wish" (spoken)		0:16
7.	"Bing Bang Bong (That's a Pirate Song)"	John Field, Cook, Fatt, Field, Page	1:21
8.	"Bucket of Dew/Paddy Condon from Cobar (Note: "Bucket of Dew / Paddy Condon from Cobar" is based on the traditional Irish folk song "The Rare Old Mountain Dew". The subtitle "Paddy Condon from Cobar" is a reference to Anthony's great-grandfather Paddy Condon who owned a pub in the mining town of Cobar in western New South Wales. - Field, Anthony; Truman, Greg (2012). How I Got My Wiggle Back: A Memoir of Healing. Hoboken, New Jersey: John Wiley & Sons. p. 220. ISBN 978-1-118-01933-7.)"		1:43
9.	"Guess What?"		1:43
10.	"Wake Up Jeff!"		1:26
11.	"A Frog Went A Walking"		1:29
12.	"Dorothy, Would You Like to Dance?"		1:52
13.	"Take a Trip Out on the Sea"		1:09
14.	"Romp Bomp a Stomp"		1:27
15.	"Whales" (spoken)		0:08
16.	"Name Game"		1:05
17.	"I Can Do So Many Things"		1:35
18.	"Wave to Wags"	John Field, Cook, Fatt, Field, Page	1:42
19.	"House on the Hillside"		1:15
20.	"Havenu Shalom Alechem"		1:12
21.	"Quacking Sounds" (spoken)		0:10
22.	"Five Little Ducks"		2:00
23.	"Windmills"		1:01
24.	"Pipers Waltz"		1:27

== Personnel ==
Source: Wake Up Jeff album booklet, 1996

The Wiggles

- Greg Page – lead vocals, back-up vocals
- Murray Cook – back-up vocals, garage band guitar, (Note: The liner notes list the guitars as "Brilliant guitar" and "Garage band guitar") bass guitar
- Anthony Field – back-up vocals, garage band guitar, tin whistle
- Jeff Fatt – back-up vocals, accordion, piano, kazeeo organ, (Note: The liner notes list the organ as kazeeo. It might be a Casio keyboard) snoring

Additional musicians

- Paul Paddick – back-up vocals
- Greg Truman – back-up vocals
- Emma Buter – back-up vocals
- Terry Murray – brilliant guitar
- Dominic Lindsay – trumpet, flugelhorn, and piccolo trumpet
- Angela Lindsay – viola
- Margaret Lindsay – cello
- Maria Schattovits – violin
- Tony Henry – drums
- Paul Rodgers – congas

Staff

- Engineered by Chris Brooke and Aaron Rhuig

== Video ==
Wake Up Jeff!
- Directed by: Dean Covell
- Written by: the Wiggles
- Produced by: Dean Covell, Keiran Usher
- Starring: Greg Page; Anthony Field; Murray Cook; Jeff Fatt
- Music by: the Wiggles
- Production company: Zero 1 Zero
- Distributed by: Roadshow Entertainment / ABC Video (#100096)
- Release date: August 1996
- Running time: 36 minutes (AUS); 35 minutes (USA)
- Country: Australia

The companion video was released in August 1996 as the group's fourth video.

=== Summary ===
==== Song list ====
1. We Like to Say Hello
2. Henry's Underwater Big Band
3. Everybody is Clever (Australian version) / The Chase (US version)
4. Having Fun at the Beach
5. Bing Bang Bong, That's a Pirate Song
6. Bucket of Dew/Paddy Condon from Cobar
7. Wake Up Jeff!
8. Dorothy, Would You Like to Dance?
9. Take a Trip Out on the Sea
10. Romp Bomp a Stomp
11. I Can Do So Many Things
12. Wave to Wags
13. Pipers Waltz
14. Goodbye Dance
15. Can You Point Your Fingers and Do the Twist? - concert
16. D.O.R.O.T.H.Y. (My Favourite Dinosaur) – concert

==== Synopsis ====
Opening – An alarm clock rings and Jeff wakes up.

The Wiggles introduce themselves to the audience.

- Song: "We Like To Say Hello"

Greg is standing with Henry the Octopus and tells Greg that he has a surprise for everyone. Henry says that he bought his underwater big band with him.

- Song: "Henry's Underwater Big Band"

Greg tells everyone to stand still like a statue. The other Wiggles pose and then dance around behind Greg's back.

- Song: "Everybody Is Clever" (Australian Version)/"The Chase" (North America Version)

Anthony and Murray watch kids draw scenes of the beach using pens and markers.

- Song: "Having Fun at the Beach"

The Wiggles introduce Captain Feathersword, but he answers with "Bing Bang Bong" and other nonsense phrases. They ask him what's up with that? He answers, that's a pirate song. Let's dance a pirate song together!

- Song: "Bing Bang Bong (That's A Pirate Song)"

Anthony and Murray introduce Dominic, who is with his daughter Ashleigh. He is a trumpet player. Anthony and Murray ask him questions about playing the trumpet and Dominic plays a little bit. Everyone's wearing a green hat, so it is time for some Irish Dancing.

- Song: "Bucket of Dew / Paddy Condon From Cobar"

The clock goes pass ticking and everybody yells WAKE UP JEFF! to wake Jeff up. And Jeff wakes up to the camera.

- Song: "Wake Up Jeff!"

Jeff asks Dorothy to dance, and Dorothy does a few dance steps.

- Song: "Dorothy (Would You Like To Dance?)"

The Wiggles and kids are in a camp site singing about going for a boat out in sea.

- Song: "Take A Trip Out on the Sea"

This is Dorothy's favourite dance.

- Song: "Romp Bomp A Stomp"

Greg and kids are doing this dance and Greg does tells them things that he can do in this song.

- Song: "I Can Do So Many Things"

Anthony can hear someone barking. He asked who's that barking and Greg yelled out IT'S WAGS THE DOG!

- Song: "Wave To Wags"
- Greg's Magic Show – The Magic Box

Greg, Anthony, and Murray are standing with an empty glass box. They can hear someone snoring and say it is coming from inside the box, but nobody is inside the box. Greg has Anthony and Murray cover the box with a drape, they spin it around, and chants some magic words when they count to three. 1, 2, 3, "Wiggle Waggle". They lift the drape and Jeff is there, but he's asleep. They ask everyone to wake him up. 1, 2, 3, WAKE UP JEFF! and then Jeff wakes up, wondering what he is doing in a box.

Murray tells Jeff to not fall asleep again and said we neeeeeeed YOU! for the next song.

- Song: "Pipers Waltz"

It's time to say goodbye. Jeff has fallen asleep again in his bed. The Wiggles have one more dance, then yell "WAKE UP JEFF!" after they clap their hands three times.

The Wiggles are backstage. They have warmed up their singing voices by practicing "Rock-a-Bye Your Bear". They also have tucked their shirts and brushed their hair. Over by the side is Wags and Henry, Wags is polishing Henry's shoes. And at the last part, Greg knew that somebody was missing. Where's Jeff? Murray saw Jeff fallen asleep on a chair and told the Wiggles that he's asleep. They call the viewer to wake up Jeff. 1, 2, 3, WAKE UP JEFF! Jeff arises and they are ready to go on stage for the concert and so they all ran out to the stage.

- Song: "Can You Point Your Fingers And Do The Twist?" (Live)
- Song: "D.O.R.O.T.H.Y. (My Favourite Dinosaur)" (Live)

=== Cast ===
The Wiggles are:

- Greg Page
- Anthony Field
- Murray Cook
- Jeff Fatt

Also featuring:

- Megan Bullivant & Emma Buter as Dorothy the Dinosaur
- Leeanne Ashley as Henry the Octopus
- Paul Paddick, Georgia Troy Barnes and Donna Halloran as Wags the Dog
- Paul Paddick as Captain Feathersword
- Dominic Lindsay as a trumpet player

=== Production ===
Anthony began wearing a blue shirt instead of a green shirt. Dorothy and Henry's costumes were updated but Dorothy's old costume is seen on "D.O.R.O.T.H.Y. (My Favourite Dinosaur)" while Henry's old one is seen on the cover. Anthony, Murray, and Greg wear short-sleeved shirts in the concert.

Paul Paddick, who joined the cast as a regular in 1996, makes his video debut as Captain Feathersword.

Tony Henry, who is a bandmate of Anthony and Jeff from The Cockroaches and the studio drummer for the Wake Up Jeff album, appears with his family in "We Like to Say Hello" and "Wave to Wags". John Field from The Cockroaches also appears in an outdoor shot for "Wave to Wags".

=== Release ===
The video was released on VHS in August 1996.

In April 2000, when the video was released in North America, "Everybody is Clever" was replaced by one of "The Chase" scenes typical of the closing credits of TV Series 1. However, the preceding skit where they act like statues was retained.

In August–September 2018, the video was uploaded to the Wiggles' YouTube channel in multiple parts.

== It's Time to Wake Up Jeff! ==
It's Time to Wake Up Jeff!

Studio album by the Wiggles
- Released: 2006
- Recorded: 2005
- Studio: Tune Master Productions
- Genre: Children's music
- Label: ABC (AUS)

The Wiggles chronology
Here Comes the Big Red Car (2006)	It's Time to Wake Up Jeff! (2006)	Splish Splash Big Red Boat (2006)

It's Time to Wake Up Jeff! is the 23rd album release from an Australian children's music group, the Wiggles. It contains songs that were originally released on Wake Up Jeff!. In North America, the album and companion video were called Wiggle Around the Clock.

=== Track list ===
1. We Like To Say Hello – 1:54
2. Henry's Underwater Big Band – 2:27
3. Intro – 0:07
4. Having Fun at the Beach – 1:42
5. Intro – 0:15
6. Bing Bang Bong (That's A Pirate Song) – 1:17
7. Bucket of Dew/ Paddy Condon From Cobar – 1:40
8. Guess What – 1:41
9. Wake Up Jeff – 1:22
10. A Frog Went A Walking – 1:25
11. Dorothy (Would You Like To Dance With Me?) – 1:49
12. Take A Trip Out on the Sea – 1:05
13. Romp Bomp A Stomp – 1:24
14. We're Playing A Trick on the Captain – 0:50
15. Have A Happy Birthday Captain – 1:51
16. I Can Do So Many Things – 1:31
17. Wave To Wags – 1:38
18. Havenu Shalom Alachem – 1:08
19. House on the Hillside – 1:56
20. Intro – 0:08
21. Five Little Ducks – 1:12
22. Windmills – 0:58
23. Name Game – 1:01
24. Pipers Waltz – 1:26
25. Bonus Track – Go To Sleep Jeff (Brahm's Lullaby) – 4:33

=== 2006 video ===
It's Time to Wake Up Jeff (Wiggle Around the Clock)
- Directed by: Paul Field
- Produced by: Paul Field
- Starring: Greg Page; Anthony Field; Murray Cook; Jeff Fatt
- Cinematography: Borce Damcevski
- Music by: the Wiggles
- Distributed by: Roadshow Entertainment/ABC DVD
- Release date: 8 June 2006
- Running time: 48 minutes
- Country: Australia
- Language: English

The companion video was released in 2006 as a DVD.

==== Song list ====
1. We Like To Say Hello
2. Henry's Underwater Big Band (animated)
3. Having Fun at the Beach
4. Bing Bang Bong (That's A Pirate Song)
5. Wake Up Jeff!
6. Bucket of Dew/Paddy Condon From Cobar
7. Romp Bomp A Stomp
8. A Frog Went a Walking (animated)
9. Take A Trip Out on the Sea
10. Dorothy (Would You Like To Dance?)
11. We're Playing a Trick on the Captain
12. Have a Happy Birthday Captain
13. I Can Do So Many Things
14. Guess What? (animated)
15. Wave To Wags
16. Havenu Shalom Alechem
17. Walking on the Moon
18. Piper's Waltz (Instrumental)
