= Go Bananas! =

2009 studio album/video by The Wiggles

Studio album by the Wiggles
- Released: 5 February 2009
- Genre: Children's music
- Label: ABC
- Producer: Anthony Field

The Wiggles chronology
Sing a Song of Wiggles (2008)	Go Bananas! (2009)	Hot Poppin' Popcorn (2009)

Go Bananas! is the 30th album released by the Australian children's music group, the Wiggles. Kylie Minogue guest stars as the pink Wiggle. This album won the 2009 Aria Award for Best Children's Album.

== Track listing ==
1. Introduction
2. Monkey Man (featuring Kylie Minogue)
3. The Chicken Walk
4. Kangaroo Jumping
5. Bless You, Bless You, Bonnie Bee
6. The Unicorn (featuring Morgan Crowley)
7. The Monkey, the Bird and the Bear
8. Little Robin Redbreast
9. The Dingle Puck Goat
10. One Monkey Who
11. Wags the Dog Is Chasing His Tail
12. Cock-A-Doodle-Doo
13. The Lion Is King
14. Rusty the Cowboy (featuring John Waters)
15. Sing, Sing!
16. The Poor King
17. Here Comes a Camel
18. Dickory, Dickory, Dare
19. Frankie the Blue Eyed Koala
20. I'm a Scary Tiger
21. Hodley Podley
22. Standing Like a Statue
23. Kangaroo, Kangaroo, What Do You See?
24. Tassie Devil
25. Once I Saw a Little Bird
26. Hippo, Hippo!

== Video ==
Go Bananas!
- Directed by: Paul Field
- Produced by: Paul Field
- Starring: Sam Moran; Anthony Field; Murray Cook; Jeff Fatt; Kylie Minogue; John Waters
- Distributed by: Roadshow Entertainment / ABC DVD
- Release date: 19 March 2009
- Running time: 101 minutes
- Country: Australia

Go Bananas! was released on ABC DVD in 2009.

=== Song list ===
1. Monkey Man (featuring Kylie Minogue)
2. The Chicken Walk
3. Kangaroo Jumping
4. Bless You, Bless You, Bonnie Bee
5. The Monkey, the Bird and the Bear
6. Little Robin Redbreast
7. The Dingle Puck Goat
8. One Monkey Who
9. Wags the Dog Is Chasing His Tail
10. Cock-A-Doodle-Doo
11. The Lion Is King
12. Rusty The Cowboy (featuring John Waters)
13. Sing, Sing!
14. The Poor King
15. Here Comes a Camel
16. Dickory, Dickory, Dare
17. Frankie the Blue-Eyed Koala
18. I'm a Scary Tiger
19. Hodley Podley
20. Standing Like a Statue
21. Kangaroo, Kangaroo, What Do You See?
22. Tassie Devil
23. Once I Saw a Little Bird
24. Hippo, Hippo!
