= You Make Me Feel Like Dancing (album) =

2008 studio album/video by The Wiggles

Studio album by the Wiggles
- Released: 8 May 2008 (Australia); 29 July 2008 (US); 1 June 2009 (UK)
- Studio: Hot Potato Studios
- Genre: Children's music
- Labels: ABC (AUS); Koch Records (US); USM Junior (UK)
- Producer: Anthony Field

The Wiggles chronology
| Pop Go the Wiggles! (2007) | You Make Me Feel Like Dancing (2008) | Sing a Song of Wiggles (2008) |

You Make Me Feel Like Dancing is the 28th album released by the Australian children's music group the Wiggles. Its title track features Leo Sayer, who wrote and performed the original song from 1976. It also features Australian country musician Troy Cassar-Daley. The CD was released on 8 May 2008, and won the Aria for Best Children's Album.

== Track list ==
1. Introduction (spoken)
2. You Make Me Feel Like Dancing (featuring Leo Sayer)
3. Dr. Knickerbocker
4. A Sailor Went to Sea/Hornpipe
5. Old Dan Tucker (featuring Troy Cassar-Daley)
6. One Finger One Thumb
7. The Shimmie Shake!
8. Two Little Dickie Birds
9. Turkey in the Straw (featuring Troy Cassar-Daley)
10. The Mooche
11. The Fairy Dance
12. I Drive the Big Red Car
13. (Are You Ready?) Do the Bus Stop
14. Tales from the Vienna Woods (instrumental)
15. Day-O (The Banana Boat Song)
16. La Bamba
17. Country Garden (instrumental)
18. The Story of Thomas the Turkey
19. Swedish Rhapsody (instrumental)

== Video ==
You Make Me Feel Like Dancing
- Directed by: Paul Field
- Produced by: Paul Field
- Starring: Sam Moran; Anthony Field; Murray Cook; Jeff Fatt; Leo Sayer; Troy Cassar-Daley
- Music by: The Wiggles
- Distributed by: Roadshow Entertainment / ABC DVD
- Release date: 5 June 2008
- Running time: 86 minutes
- Country: Australia

The Wiggles have made their video, "You Make Me Feel Like Dancing", on 5 June 2008.

Song list

1. "You Make Me Feel Like Dancing" (featuring Leo Sayer)
2. "Dr. Knickerbocker"
3. "A Sailor Went to Sea/Hornpipe"
4. "Old Dan Tucker" (featuring Troy Casser-Daley)
5. "One Finger, One Thumb"
6. "The Shimmie Shake!"
7. "The Fairy Dance"
8. "Day-O (The Banana Boat Song)"
9. "Swedish Rhapsody" (instrumental)
10. "La Bamba"
11. "I Drive the Big Red Car"
12. "Are You Ready? (Do The Bus Stop)"
13. "Follow the Leader"
14. "Tales of the Vienna Woods" (instrumental)
15. "To Have a Tea Party"
16. "The Mooche"
17. "First in Line"
18. "Swinging on a Swing"
19. "Country Garden" (instrumental)
20. "We're All Friends"
