= Evie Ferris =

Australian singer and dancer (born 1997

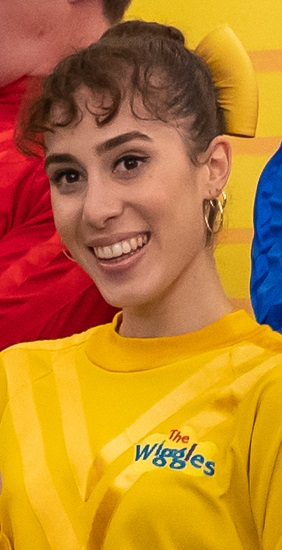
- Ferris in 2022

Background information
- Born: 18 February 1997 (age 29); Cairns, Australia
- Occupations: Ballerina, singer, dancer
- Years active: 2007–present
- Member of: The Wiggles

Evie Ferris (born 18 February 1997) is an Australian ballerina and member of children's music group The Wiggles. She joined The Australian Ballet in 2015 and was promoted to coryphée in 2023. Ferris joined The Wiggles in 2021, becoming the group's first Indigenous Australian member.

== Early life ==
Ferris was born in Cairns, Queensland, and attended St Andrews Catholic College until year 7. She began dance and performing arts classes at the age of four. By 2007 she had a supporting role in The Australian Ballet's production of Don Quixote.

== Early career ==
Ferris was one of eight dancers to earn a role after auditioning with 150 other young dancers, and she was a puppet in the story in the Man of La Mancha. In 2010, at the age of twelve, she moved to Melbourne to join the Australian Ballet School. She toured with the school's Dancer's Company in 2014 and 2015 and undertook a student exchange to Canada in 2015. In 2015 she was selected to join The Australian Ballet, where she was the second Indigenous ballerina after Ella Havelka.

Ferris was promoted to coryphée with The Australian Ballet in 2023. Her performances with the company have included roles in Swan Lake and George Balanchine's Jewels. In a 2024 interview, she identified the Cygnets in Swan Lake and the Rubies section of Jewels among the ballet roles she had performed.

== The Wiggles ==
In 2021, Ferris was selected to join The Wiggles as part of its expanded line-up. She appeared as the second Blue Wiggle originally but has changed to be a Yellow Wiggle. As a Taribelang and Djabugay woman, she is the first Indigenous Australian to be a member of the group.
