= Lachlan Gillespie =

Australian musician, singer and actor (born 1985)

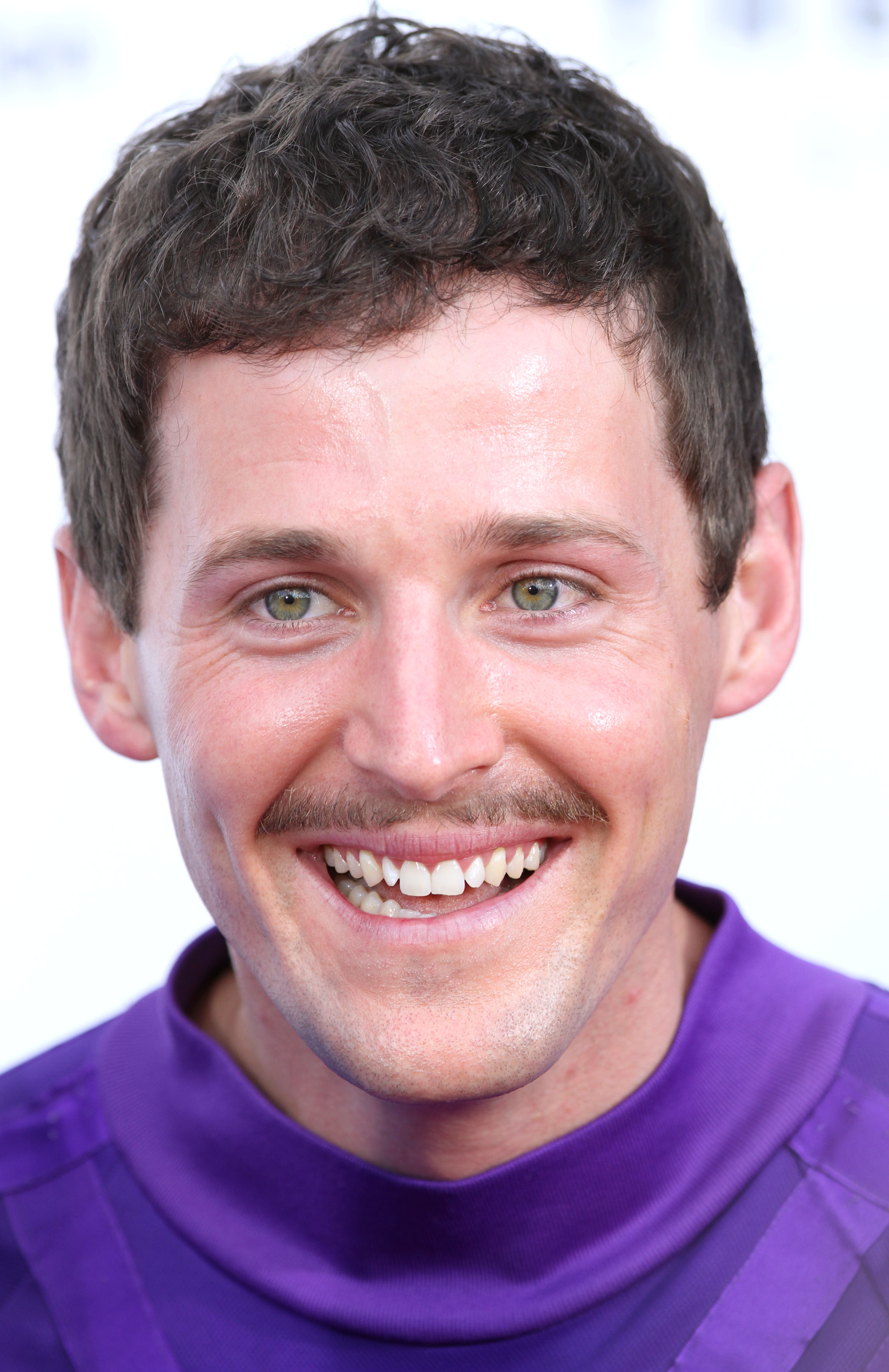
- Gillespie at the 2014 ARIA Music Awards, Sydney, 26 November 2014
- Born: Lachlan Gillespie; 23 October 1985 (age 41); Brisbane, Queensland, Australia
- Other name: Lachy
- Occupations: Children's entertainer; singer; musician; actor
- Years active: 2009–present
- Spouses: Emma Watkins (m. 2016; div. 2018); Dana Stephensen (m. 2022)
- Children: 2
- Musical career
- Genre: Children's
- Instruments: Vocals; keyboards; guitar; xylophone

Lachlan Gillespie (born 23 October 1985) is an Australian children's entertainer, singer, musician, and actor. He is a member of the Wiggles and wears the purple skivvy.

== Early life ==
Gillespie began playing the piano at the age of four, and started formal singing training when he was 12. He attended the Fame School of Performing Arts as a teenager, earned a Bachelor of Arts in musical theatre at the Western Australian Academy of Performing Arts (WAAPA), and has performed in musicals in Melbourne and New York. He has been a vocal and drama coach for children between the ages of four and 13.

== The Wiggles ==
Gillespie joined the Wiggles in 2009, touring with the "Dorothy the Dinosaur Traveling Show", as Captain Feathersword, and then as a Wiggly Dancer and Wags the Dog during the group's regular tour. In May 2012, it was announced that Gillespie would replace founding member Jeff Fatt as the Purple Wiggle at the beginning of the following year. Gillespie hosts the short-form television show Lachy! which aired on ABC in 2016. It contains episode shorts of him as Lachy Wiggle.

In 2018, Gillespie, along with fellow Wiggles member Anthony Field, Emma Watkins and band members Oliver Brian and David O'Reilly, started a band for adult fans called the Unusual Commoners, which played a mixture of traditional Australian, Irish, Scottish and folk songs. They performed their first international show in St. John's, Newfoundland in late 2018.

== Personal life ==
In May 2015, Gillespie and fellow Wiggles performer Emma Watkins announced their engagement. They married on 9 April 2016 at Hopewood House in Bowral, New South Wales. On 3 August 2018, Gillespie and Watkins announced their separation. On 9 April 2020, ballet dancer Dana Stephensen proposed to Gillespie after meeting on the set of the Wiggles in December 2018. They wed in late November 2022.

On 11 September 2020, Gillespie announced the birth of their twin daughters, Lottie and Lulu.
