= Seymour Centre =

Performing arts centre at the University of Sydney

- Seymour

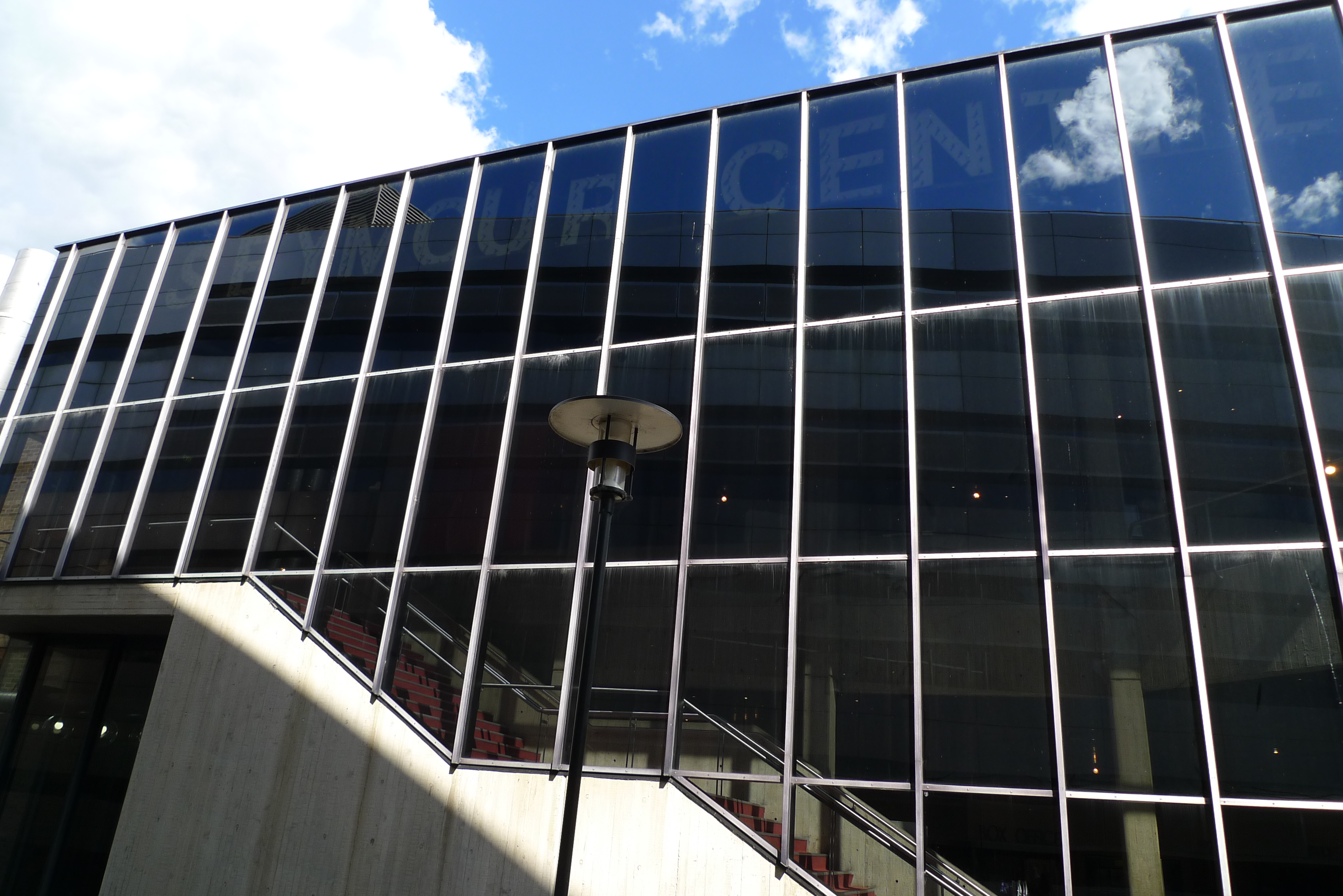
- Facade, pictured in 2011
- Interactive map of Seymour Centre
- Address: City Road and Cleveland Street, Chippendale; Sydney, New South Wales; Australia
- Coordinates: 33.8886°S 151.1935°E
- Owner: University of Sydney
- Seating type: Amphitheatre (The York Theatre)
- Capacity: 780 (The York Theatre)

Construction
- Opened: 1975
- Architect: Allen Jack+Cottier

Website
- sydney.edu.au/seymour/

The Seymour Centre is a multi-purpose performing arts centre within the University of Sydney, located in the city of Sydney, Australia. It is located on the corner of City Road and Cleveland Street in Chippendale, south-west of the city centre, in the City of Sydney local government area.

The building was designed by the architectural firm Allen Jack+Cottier and was opened in 1975. Internal refurbishments were carried out in 2000, designed by Lahz Nimmo Architects.

In addition to public performance areas, the building houses facilities for the Department of Music at the University of Sydney.

== History ==
Sydney businessman, Everest York Seymour, died in 1966 and left a significant bequest for ‘...the construction of a building to serve as a centre for the cultivation, education and performance of musical and dramatic arts...'. The University of Sydney became the trustee of this bequest, and Allen Jack+Cottier were commissioned to design a performing arts centre to be known as The Seymour Centre.

== Performance venues and facilities ==
=== The York Theatre ===
The York is the largest theatre in the centre, with seating for 780 patrons. It has a Thrust stage configuration, with seats in a semi-circular, amphitheatre-style arrangement and is used for drama and musical performances, and spoken-word events.

=== The Everest Theatre ===
The Everest theatre is an end-stage theatre, seating up to 605, depending on configuration. It was designed for musical performances and includes a variety of acoustic features to manipulate and control sound quality, but is also used for theatrical and dance performances.

=== The Reginald Theatre ===
The Reginald Theatre, previously known as the Downstairs Theatre, is a smaller, informal Studio theatre, seating up to 200, with a wide variety of uses.

=== The Sound Lounge ===
A smaller, cabaret-style venue for up to 120 people. It serves light meals and refreshments.

=== Restaurants and Bars ===
Refreshments are available on each level, including a coffee cart in the main foyer. A BBQ also operates in the front courtyard opposite the main entrance, from one and a half hours prior to selected shows.

== Program ==
Each year, the Centre presents a wide range of performing arts productions and events; plays host to a number of festivals; provides an education program; presents children's theatre; and produces dance, theatre and music productions. The University of Sydney Revues are held at the Seymour each year, as well as many end-of-year dance school concerts.

Notably, The Wiggles performed here during their December 1994, December 1995, and December 1996 concerts. One of the December 1996 concerts was filmed and shown on their first concert video, Wiggledance!.

=== Festival events ===
Festivals that program events at the Seymour Centre include the Sydney Festival, the Sydney Gay and Lesbian Mardi Gras, the Sydney Children's Festival, the Sydney Fringe Festival, and the Sydney Comedy Festival.

=== Seymour Sessions ===
The Seymour Sessions is an annual series of music events taking place at Seymour Centre. Founded in 2012, they feature emerging local artists and were for years curated by publisher and events organiser Larry Heath, of Heath Media. Running each Friday from early February (formerly January) through to mid-March each year, the sessions feature free live music, food, and drink. The event is presented in partnership with the City of Sydney. A special session is run in association with the Sydney Mardi Gras.
