= Wiggledance! =

- Wiggledance! VHS cover
- Directed by: Dean Covell
- Written by: The Wiggles
- Produced by: Dean Covell and the Wiggles
- Starring: Greg Page; Anthony Field; Murray Cook; Jeff Fatt
- Edited by: Nick Pandoulis; Hattie Dalton
- Distributed by: Roadshow Entertainment / ABC Video (#100766)
- Release date: June 10, 1997
- Running time: 46 minutes
- Country: Australia

Wiggledance! is the fifth video by the children's band the Wiggles and their first full-length concert video. It was filmed during their December 1996 concerts at the Seymour Centre, and released in June 1997. It was released only to the Australia region.

== Song list ==
1. Rock-a-Bye Your Bear
2. Can You (Point Your Fingers And Do The Twist?)
3. Dorothy the Dinosaur
4. Dorothy (Would You Like to Dance?)
5. Vini Vini (1997 version only)
6. Wags the Dog
7. Quack, Quack
8. Wake Up Jeff!
9. Nya, Nya, Nya
10. Five Little Joeys
11. Baby Beluga
12. Let's Have a Dance with Henry
13. Romp Bomp a Stomp
14. Hot Potato
15. Get Ready to Wiggle (Note: In a Ten News interview, Emma Watkins of the new generation Wiggles mentions that she and her sister, Hayley were at this concert and were shown in the video. - Ten News (18 May 2012). Wiggle reaction. Event occurs at 0:54-1:03 – via YouTube. The same video footage was featured on Today Tonight - Today Tonight (18 May 2012). New generation of Wiggles. Event occurs at 2:39 – via YouTube.) (Note: After the Wiggles say goodbye, Captain Feathersword stays around and leads one more song "Nya Nya Nya". "Jeff's Christmas Tune" is also used as background music for the closing credits.)

== Production ==
The Wiggles logo was updated to feature a yellow splotch background behind their name. The Wiggles still wore plain coloured shirts in the video with short sleeves instead of long ones.

Due to copyright concerns, the song "Vini Vini" was removed after the video's initial release. The subsequent release of Wiggledance, while retaining the copyright year 1997, have removed this video and its introduction. Former Wiggles member Phillip Wilcher has mentioned that the Wiggles believed that the song was in the public domain but it was claimed by a French composer.

On 4 April 2013, the Wiggles announced the addition of Wiggledance! to their Wiggle Time TV service. In 2019, the 1997 master was released into multiple segments on their YouTube channel as Classic Wiggles in multiple parts.

== Cast ==
The Wiggles are:

- Murray Cook
- Jeff Fatt
- Anthony Field
- Greg Page

Also featuring:

- Paul Paddick as Captain Feathersword
- Leanne Halloran as a police officer, known as Officer Beaples in the TV series. Halloran also plays Henry the Octopus and is the choreographer for the show.
- Donna Halloran as Wags the Dog, and a zookeeper
- Leeanne Ashley as Dorothy the Dinosaur
  - Carolyn Ferrie provides the voice for Dorothy

== See also ==
- The Wiggly Big Show
- Live Hot Potatoes!
