= The Wiggly Big Show =

- Directed by: Chisholm McTavish
- Produced by: Paul Field
- Starring: Greg Page; Anthony Field; Murray Cook; Jeff Fatt
- Edited by: Phil Stuart-Jones
- Music by: The Wiggles
- Distributed by: Roadshow Entertainment
- Release date: 6 September 1999
- Running time: 60 minutes
- Country: Australia

The Wiggly Big Show is the Wiggles' eighth video and their second concert video, after Wiggledance!. It was released on 6 September 1999 and, like Wiggledance, was only released in the Australia region.

The concert was taped at the Sydney Entertainment Centre during their Toot Toot! tour. The video includes backstage segments that were edited in afterwards.

== Songs ==
1. Officer Beaples' Dance
2. Toot Toot, Chugga Chugga, Big Red Car
3. Look Both Ways
4. Can You Point Your Fingers and Do The Twist?
5. Rock-A-Bye Your Bear
6. The Monkey Dance
7. Silver Bells That Ring in the Night
8. We're Dancing with Wags the Dog
9. Tap Wags
10. Our Boat is Rocking on the Sea
11. Captain Feathersword Fell Asleep on His Pirate Ship (Quack Quack)
12. Bucket of Dew
13. Romp Bomp A Stomp
14. Hot Potato
15. Do the Wiggle Groove
16. Move Your Arms Like Henry
17. Go Captain Feathersword, Ahoy!
18. Wiggly Medley
19. Let's Have a Party (Instrumental)
20. Wiggly Christmas Medley (Note: "Wiggly Christmas Medley" includes the following songs: "Have a Very Merry Christmas"; "Unto Us This Holy Night" / "Feliz Navidad"; "Jingle Bells"; "Let's Have a Dance with Henry"; "Let's Clap Hands with Santa Claus"; "Go Santa Go")
21. Toot Toot, Chugga Chugga, Big Red Car (Reprise)

== Cast ==
=== The Wiggles ===
- Greg Page
- Anthony Field
- Murray Cook
- Jeff Fatt

=== Also featuring ===
- Paul Paddick as Captain Feathersword
- Leeanne Ashley as Dorothy the Dinosaur
- Edward Rooke as Wags the Dog
- Reem Hanwell as Henry the Octopus
- Leanne Halloran as Officer Beaples
- Cassandra Halloran, Jessica Halloran, Kristen Knox, Cameron Lewis, Joanna Murphy, Scott Porter, Sian Ryan and Larissa Wright as dancers

== Production ==
The video was filmed during the group's concert tour to promote the Toot, Toot! album and companion video. Footage from multiple concerts was used. The "Wiggly Christmas Medley" has been incorporated into some episodes in the television series and added to the 1999 version of Wiggly, Wiggly, Christmas.

== See also ==
- Wiggledance!
- Live Hot Potatoes!
