= Victoria Park, Sydney =

Australian historic site

Victoria Park
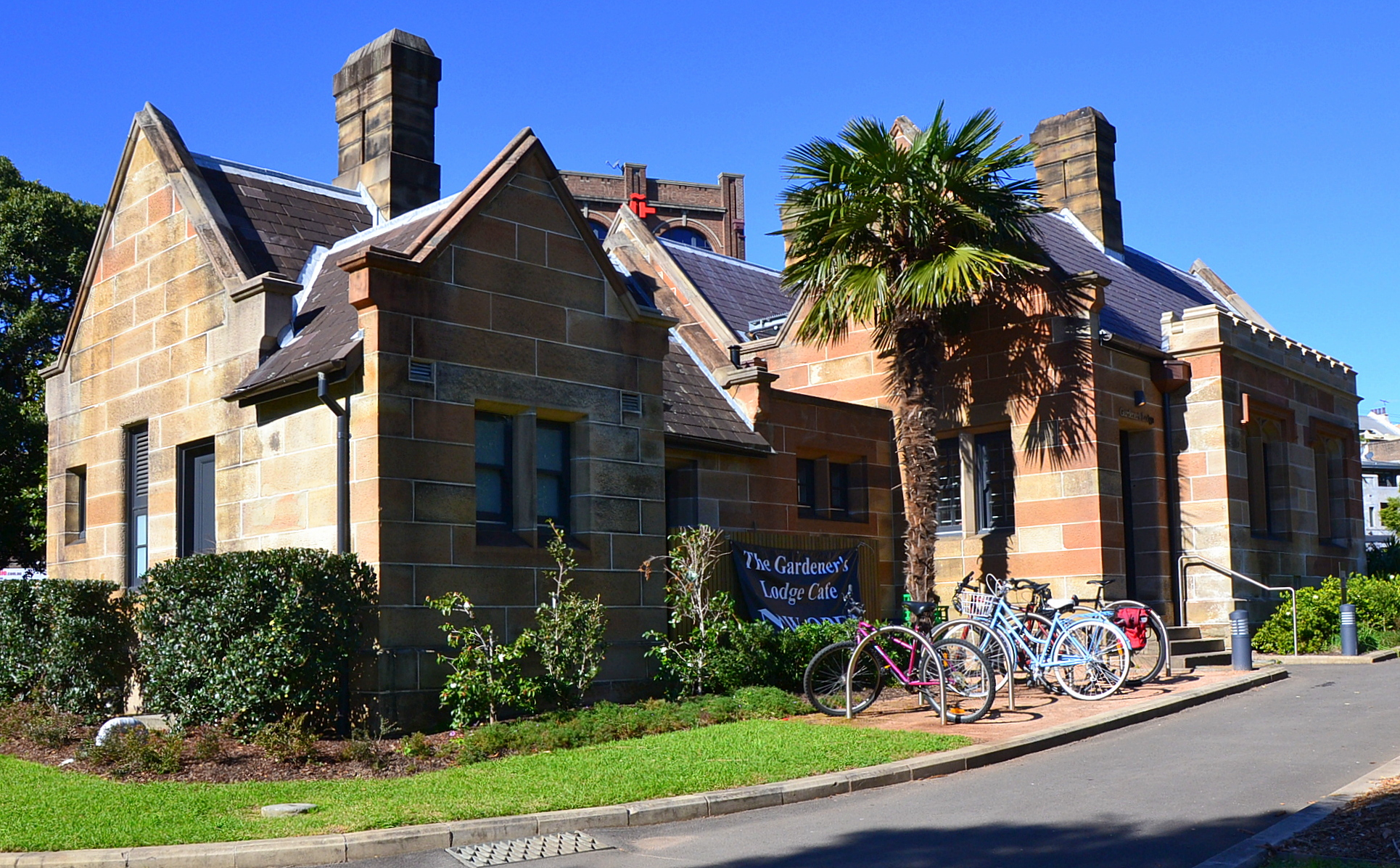
- The Gardener's Lodge, formerly used as a toilet block, is now a cafe, located in the park
- Interactive map of Victoria Park
- Type: City park
- Location: Corner of Parramatta Road and City Road, Camperdown, City of Sydney, New South Wales, Australia
- Coordinates: 33°53′08″S 151°11′36″E
- Area: 9 hectares (22 acres)
- Created: 16 July 1870
- Designer: Charles Moore
- Operator: City of Sydney (since 1911)
- Website: www.cityofsydney.nsw.gov.au/explore/facilities/parks/major-parks/victoria-park

New South Wales Heritage Register
- Official name: The University of Sydney, University Colleges and Victoria Park; Sydney University; Grose Farm; St Paul's College; St John's College; St Andrew's College; Women's College; Wesley College; Sancta Sophia College
- Type: State heritage (landscape)
- Designated: 31 August 2018
- Reference no.: 01974
- Type: Conservation area
- Category: University
- Builders: James Jones

New South Wales Heritage Database (Local Government Register)
- Official name: Victoria Park, Gardener's Lodge and its interior, entry gates and piers, park layout, paths and plantings
- Type: Local government (landscape)
- Criteria: a., b., c., d., f., g.
- Designated: 14 December 2012
- Reference no.: 139
- Group: Parks, Gardens and Trees
- Category: Urban park

Victoria Park is a 9-hectare (22-acre) urban park situated on the corner of Parramatta Road and City Road, Camperdown, in the City of Sydney, New South Wales, Australia. The park is located adjacent to The University of Sydney and the Broadway Shopping Centre.

Proclaimed as a park in 1870, Victoria Park, together with The University of Sydney and its associated University Colleges were listed on the New South Wales State Heritage Register on 31 August 2018. The park and features including Gardener's Lodge and its interior, the park's entry gates and piers, and the park layout, paths and plantings were listed on the City of Sydney local government heritage list on 14 December 2012.

== History ==
Victoria Park was originally part of Grose Farm, which in 1853 was designated as the site for the University of Sydney. In 1865 an area at the intersection of City Road and Parramatta Road was granted to the university for the building of a formal entrance to the university.

The park was designed in the picturesque style by Charles Moore, director of the Royal Botanic Garden. Moore used James Jones (born 1839) who became Overseer of the Domains in Sydney from 1884, whose post involved planning and supervising all outside work required by the NSW Government in the city suburbs and country. This included all garden requirements of the Government Architect (railways, police, hospitals, schools) in addition to layout out several municipal parks. A grand entrance avenue, aligned with the central tower of the university's main quadrangle building, was built connecting this entrance area with the university. The remainder of the former farm between the entrance area and the university proper was proclaimed Victoria Park in 1870.

In the late 1880s, two lodges (one of which survives while the other was demolished in 1940) and a set of ornate gates, designed by Colonial Architect James Barnet, were built at the start of the entrance avenue on the corner of City Road and Parramatta Road.

By the end of the 19th century, the main point of access to the university switched to the entrance further west on Parramatta Road, opposite Derwent Road. Between 1910 and 1940 an area roughly east of the line of Eastern Avenue, which had been part of Victoria Park, became part of the University's grounds; and gradually severed the historical vista along the entrance avenue, and the entrance avenue itself disappeared. In 1911 management of Victoria Park given to Sydney City Council, works included; park planning, further plantings, establishment of a children's playground, extension of the bowling club and the introduction of park lighting. In 1927 the avenue through Victoria Park was formally reduced to a right of way. During the 1930s extensive remodelling of Victoria Park were completed including the lake, lawns, pathways, plantings, filling in of small pond (near current swimming pool), removal of iron railing surrounding the Park and creation of fence between the park and the University. Between 1924 and 1946 the University exchanged 3 hectares (7.75 acres) of lake and main drive with the Sydney City Council for 4 hectares (9 acres) of Victoria Park in the Eastern Avenue area.

In 1955 the Victoria Park Swimming Pool (named in honour of King George VI) opened. The pool was the first in-ground public swimming pool in Sydney. The Victoria Park lake was reduced and the bridge that carried the avenue over the lake was demolished in 1955. The eastern gates were moved to the university's main City Road entrance via Eastern Avenue. During the 1960s the Victoria Park Lawn Bowls club house was replaced, dominating the City Road section of the park. In 1961 the University Site Development plans were presented with formation of functional precincts, landscaping with pedestrian precedence over vehicles. In 1964 Victoria Park lake re-named Lake Northam, in honour of Bill Northam.

In the 1970s Victoria Park plantings modified and flower beds reduced. In the 1990s South Sydney Council rebuilt a pedestrian path along the old entrance avenue, with a bridge rebuilt over the lake (Lake Northam). The historical vista was restored after a series of initiatives around the turn of the 21st century. In the 1990s the South Sydney City Council restored the main avenue in Victoria Park as a pedestrian path with a bridge over an enlarged Lake Northam and new garden beds. In 1992 a Draft Plan of Management for Victoria Park was created; and revised the following year. In 1998 the Victoria Park Lawn Bowls clubhouse was removed and the following year, the lawn bowls greens removed and returfed. In 2002 the University undertook works to extend the vista along that path, including the construction of a set of steps leading from Victoria Park into the University. In 2007, at the same time as reconfiguring Eastern Avenue, the original entrance gates were restored to the City Road end of the entrance avenue. In 2010 Victoria Park playground upgrade was completed; and in 2012 the Gardener's Lodge restored and refurbished as cafe. In 2017 Victoria Park works including new paths, lighting, seating, signage, recreation space and refurbishing of Lake Northam commenced.

== Description ==
Proclaimed on 16 July 1870, Victoria Park is of historical significance as a significant Victorian era park in Sydney and its part in the early history of Camperdown. It is also significant for its close association with The University of Sydney. The park retains substantial components, including fabric, spaces, layout and Victorian character of its formative 19th century planning and design.

The park contains an in-ground public swimming pool, built in 1953 and named in honour of King George VI who died the previous year. Originally it consisted of a main pool, wading pool, and male and female changing rooms. Later a children's playground and kiosk were added. A lake, initially named Horse Pond, was formed in the 1930s after a stormwater channel to Blackwattle Bay was closed. A representational bronze sculpture of the yacht Barrenjoey was installed on the island in the centre of the lake to commemorate the gold medal for yachting won by Bill Northam, an alderman on Sydney City Council, at the 1964 Olympic Games At the same time the lake was renamed as Lake Northam in his honour. In the 1990s the lake was enlarged and a bridge, demolished in 1955, reinstated as part of the restoration of the University entrance avenue vista.

A totem pole near the southern corner of the park was "presented to the people of Sydney in the name of the government and people of Canada on the occasion of National Timber Week, 1964". The pole was carved by Simon Charlie, a Quamichan man from Vancouver Island, British Columbia.

The Gardener's Lodge adjacent to City Road was used as a toilet block for a long time, and eventually restored and now used as a café. The Lodge and the sandstone gates nearby originally guarded the eastern edge of the University grounds.

== Heritage listing ==
The University of Sydney, University Colleges and Victoria Park is of state historical significance as a vestige of Governor Phillip's original 405-hectare (1,000-acre) "Kanguroo Ground" Crown reserve of 1790 and for its connection to the 18th century British government's approach to colonialism and its concept of "terra nullius" as the foundation for dispossession of Aboriginal land in the immediate area of Sydney.

The cultural landscape is of state heritage significance for its ability to demonstrate activities of the colonial era (1792-1855) associated with Grose Farm, convict stockade, and female orphan school.

The University of Sydney and Victoria Park as connected landscapes have tangible links to Charles Moore, Director of the Royal Botanic Gardens (1848-1896) and subsequent designers using prevalent 19th century theories of landscape design, plant material and horticultural techniques. Victoria Park is a significant Victorian-era park dedicated in 1870. The park retains substantial components of its formative 19th-century planning and design, including the grand avenue linking City Road and the remaining original gate lodge to the tower of the Main Building of the University. The provision of sport and leisure facilities across the site have contributing significantly to the retention of open space and green buffers between the built forms of the campus, and are important to the people of Sydney and NSW.

The University of Sydney, University Colleges and Victoria Park has been a major landmark of Sydney and NSW since its inception. It holds substantial social values and associations, and is held in high esteem for a range of affiliated communities and groups as an iconic place of historic, academic, cultural, sporting, recreational and social pursuits and events.

The intactness of the groupings of buildings and landscapes across the history of the development of the site represents a microcosm of the development of architectural design, town planning and landscape design in New South Wales and Australia.

Victoria Park was listed on the New South Wales State Heritage Register on 31 August 2018 having satisfied the following criteria.

The place is important in demonstrating the course, or pattern, of cultural or natural history in New South Wales.

The University of Sydney, University Colleges and Victoria Park is of state significance for its historical connection that dates back to the foundation of the colony. The site encompasses a portion of the original 405-hectare (1,000-acre) "Kanguroo Ground" reserved by Governor Arthur Phillip in August 1790. Inclusive of timbered land, prominent ridges, and valleys with fresh water sources, this tract of land was designated for church (400 acres), Crown (400 acres) and school (200 acres) usage. The site is a vestige of the latter two areas. The later leasing of the part of this land to military officers (Grose Farm) and its use for agistment, agricultural experimentation, farming education, a stockade for convicts and establishment of a female orphan school provides an understanding of the cultural history of the local area.

The site is of state heritage significance for its continuity of provision of sporting and leisure facilities to the people of Sydney and NSW. Sport also has been an important factor in University student life and in the use of the University grounds. The sporting facilities at the University contributed significantly to the retention of open space and green buffers between the built forms of the campus.

The site has held socially and nationally significant sporting events such as horse racing (pre and post university), rugby football (oldest club in Australia), cricket, tennis and hockey (including inter-state and international matches) and Sydney's first in-ground public pool (King George VI, Victoria Park). Victoria Park has been a place of continuous children's play & leisure activities for over 130 years, with a playground being a feature of the Park since 1912.

The place has a strong or special association with a person, or group of persons, of importance of cultural or natural history of New South Wales's history.

The University of Sydney, University Colleges and Victoria Park has state significance for its association with a large number of notable people who were involved in the development and expansion of the University, its lands, the buildings, landscape and grounds. These include the initial land owners, those responsible for and involved in the initial establishment of the University as an institution, and the architects and designers who have designed and constructed the principal buildings and landscapes throughout each campus and developed the master plans for the place.

In regard to the University of Sydney as an historic cultural landscape, there are a number of people who were involved in the initial establishment and subsequent development of the University and so have strong associations with the place. These include the following people, together with their association or contribution:

- Governor Arthur Phillip – reserved part of "Kanguroo Ground" for future church, Crown and school usage; 1790
- Lieutenant Governor Francis Grose – original leaseholder; 1792
- Edmund Blacket (former NSW Colonial Architect) – First architect for the University of Sydney and responsible for the core buildings the Quadrangle Building; 1854-1862
- Charles Moore – First Director of the Royal Botanic Gardens - responsible for the design of the plantings in Victoria Park and University Place in front of Quadrangle; 1880
- Walter Liberty Vernon (NSW Government Architect) – architect for the University of Sydney and responsible for the first whole of site plan for the place
- George McRae (NSW Government Architect) – architect for the University, developed a plan for the whole of the place; 1914, resulting in the formalising and development of Science Road
- Walter Burley Griffin – Architect who developed a whole of site plan for the University focussing on landscape and visual and planning axes; 1915.

The place is important in demonstrating aesthetic characteristics and/or a high degree of creative or technical achievement in New South Wales.

The University of Sydney, University Colleges and Victoria Park is of state significance for a number of fine examples of architecture and landscape design. These aesthetic values relate to:

- The University of Sydney and Victoria Park as connected landscapes, with planted features, including individual specimen trees, avenues of mature trees, open lawns, designed gardens and courtyards. The open spaces and roadways contribute to the aesthetic significance of the place and significant axial views. Across the site there are landscapes and gardens which demonstrate Picturesque (1850s-1890s), Arts and Crafts (1890s-1917) and Georgian Revival/Mediterranean (1915-1940s) aesthetic characteristics;
- Victoria Park for its landmark location on the intersection of two major thoroughfares (Parramatta Road and City Road), as an "Approach Reserve" to the University of Sydney and its visual relationship to the University of Sydney. The Park retains substantial components of its formative 19th century "picturesque" planning and design including fabric, spaces, layout, its Victorian character and importantly, the grand avenue linking City Road and the remaining original gate lodge to the tower of the Main Building of the University;
- The sporting facilities at the University and Colleges contributing significantly to the retention of open space and green buffers between the built forms of the campus. They are traditional open spaces that are readily associated with university and college life, and they form a strong element of the traditional campus form; and
- Site features such as the boundary treatments, gateways, artworks (sculptures) and memorials that individually and together contribute to the overall aesthetic and historic character of the University as a whole.

The place has a strong or special association with a particular community or cultural group in New South Wales for social, cultural or spiritual reasons.

The University of Sydney, University Colleges and Victoria Park has substantial social values at state level for a range of affiliated communities and groups. These values are attached to the whole of the University, each of the colleges, campuses and individual faculties, Victoria Park, as well as smaller precincts, vistas, buildings and features in the grounds. These values may be associated with experiences and memories that these places may hold and include:

- Association as a major place for sporting groups and events;
- The Park's sense of place, as a landmark major open space within inner-Sydney, a passive recreation area, and for the active use of the Victoria Park Swimming Pool;
- The swimming pool as a focus of over 60 years of water-based recreational activity within the Park for the local and broader community;
- The Park being used for major events and gatherings including an unofficial Aboriginal tent embassy (2000-2004), the Yabun Festival of Aboriginal and Torres Strait Islander cultures held annually on 26 January, and the annual Sydney Gay and Lesbian Mardi Gras Fair Day; and
- Over 130 years of children using Victoria Park as a place of play.

The place has potential to yield information that will contribute to an understanding of the cultural or natural history of New South Wales.

The cultural landscape is of state heritage significance for its ability to demonstrate activities of the colonial era (1792-1855) associated with Grose Farm, convict stockade and orphan school. The potential for significant archaeological evidence of the post-European settlement period relates to the pre-university land use of Grose Farm, and the early development of the University and Park.

The place possesses uncommon, rare or endangered aspects of the cultural or natural history of New South Wales.

The University of Sydney, University Colleges and Victoria Park contain a number of buildings and landscapes that are rare or unique and of state significance. These include:

- The long axis and grand triple avenue (of which major remnants remain) linking City Road to Edmund Blacket's Main Building tower being a rare example of a Blacket landscape design;
- Victoria Park as a contemporarily planned setting for a major 19th century university campus, being a reserve associated from its beginnings with the first university in Australia;
- Landscape and planted features from the early 1880s of individual specimen trees and avenues of mature trees, including rare plantings in cultivation in Sydney (e.g. Combretum erythrophyllum, Ficus superba var., Muelleri and, possibly, Ficus macrophylla subsp. columnaris and Quercus acutissima);
- Botanical collections such as camellia plantings by E. G. Waterhouse and rare cultural landscape groupings of significant trees;
- The intactness of the groupings of buildings across the history of the development of the site (i.e few have been demolished); and
- All the above and others, that individually and together contribute to the overall unique and historic character of the site as a whole.

The place is important in demonstrating the principal characteristics of a class of cultural or natural places/environments in New South Wales.

The University of Sydney, University Colleges and Victoria Park is of state significance as an item that demonstrates principal characteristics of a class of NSWs cultural place or environment as the site:

- Is one of the finest examples of connected landscapes in NSW with a continuous history from pre-colonial times to today. The University grounds are inextricably linked to Victoria Park and reflect Governor Phillip's designated land reserve (1789) for school, Crown and church purposes, with an allowance for the "formation of a park and garden in connection therewith". The developed landscapes having retained the topography and much of the original landform. The site retains elements of the early colonial Grose Farm, the establishment of the University and the colonial landscaping;
- Demonstrates the aspirations of colonial Sydney to shape its own society, polity and ideals, which ultimately led to the establishment of the University of Sydney and University Colleges by Acts of Parliament in 1850 and 1854 respectively. The University is a tangible representation of the early development of NSW and the development of the state and nation. It represents an important part of the development of NSW and Australia into the country that we see today. It is a significant example of the influence of government-funded education. The distribution of the University colleges around the periphery (separating the teaching buildings from the residential), stressed the communal nature of the University as a whole;
- Represents a microcosm of the development of architectural design, town planning and landscape design in New South Wales and Australia;
- Has been a major landmark of Sydney and NSW since its inception and reflects a fulfilment of Governor Phillip's designated land reserve (1789) for school, Crown and church purposes, with an allowance for the "formation of a park and garden in connection therewith". Prominence of the University was created with the placement of Edmund Blacket's Main Quadrangle Building on the crest of Petersham Ridge, with sweeping views up to it from the main artery leaving the city, Parramatta Road. The positioning of the building was a conscious statement of the importance of the University. Victoria Park is unique within NSW as a contemporarily planned setting for a major 19th century university campus. Overall, many features of this large site retain their integrity from the date of their establishment. Such features include the alignment of the site boundaries and their treatments, the internal layout of many of the roads, the configuration of buildings and gardens and the uses of the buildings and precincts; and
- Is held in high esteem by the local community, local council, students, graduates, academics, staff, benefactors and sporting club members as an iconic place of historic, academic, cultural, sporting, recreational and social pursuits and events.

== Gallery ==
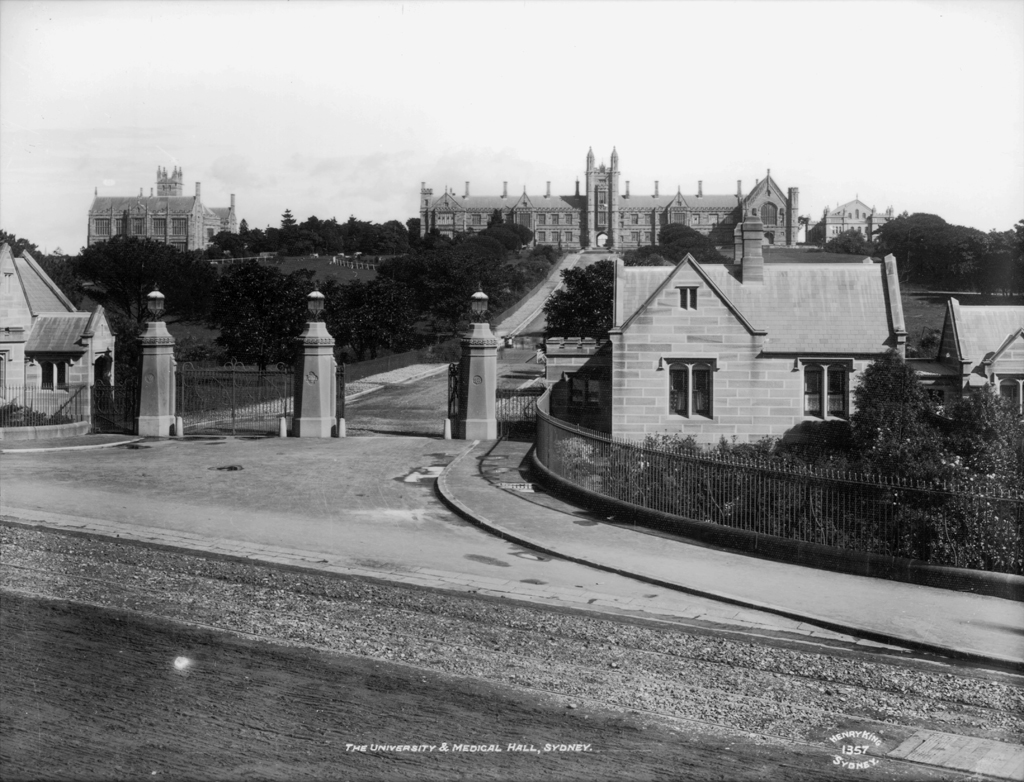
The former formal entrance to The University of Sydney, flanked by the Gardener's Lodge (extant) and the Messenger's Lodge (demolished 1940), now the eastern end of Victoria Park at the corner of City Road and Parramatta Road

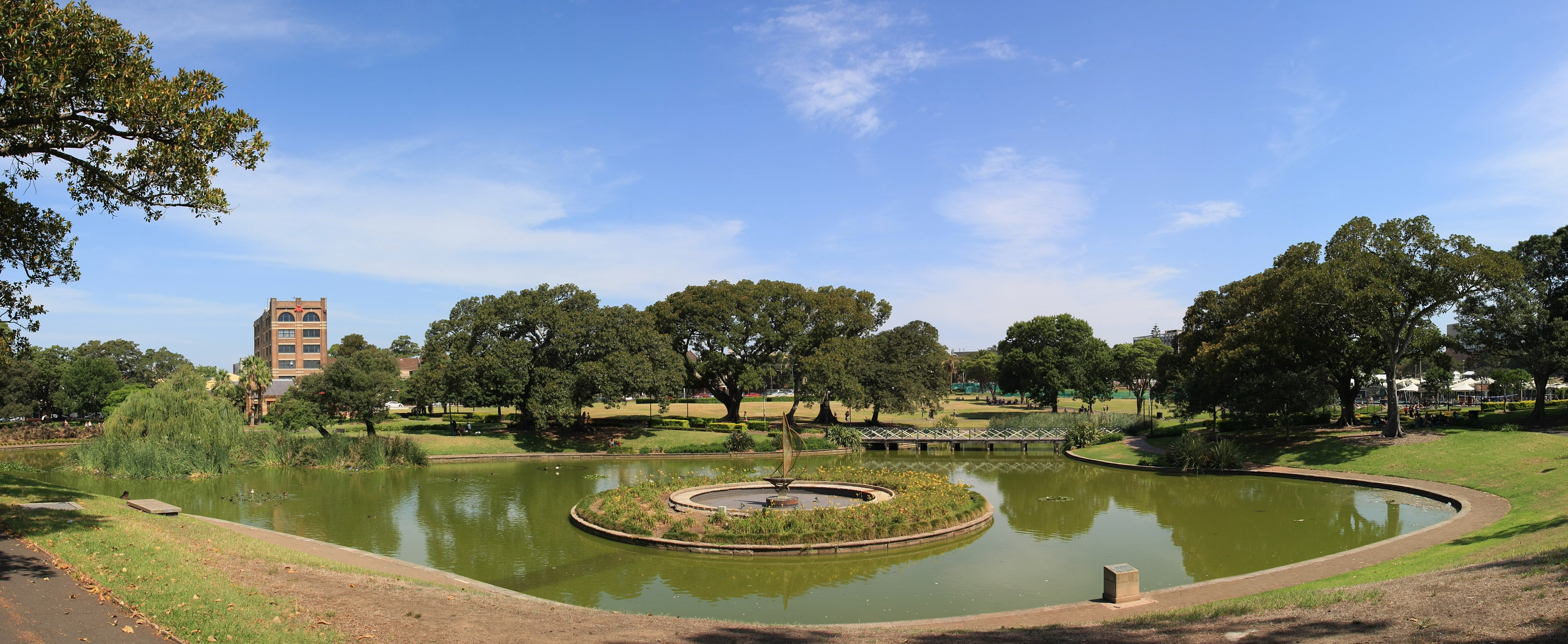
Lake Northam in summer

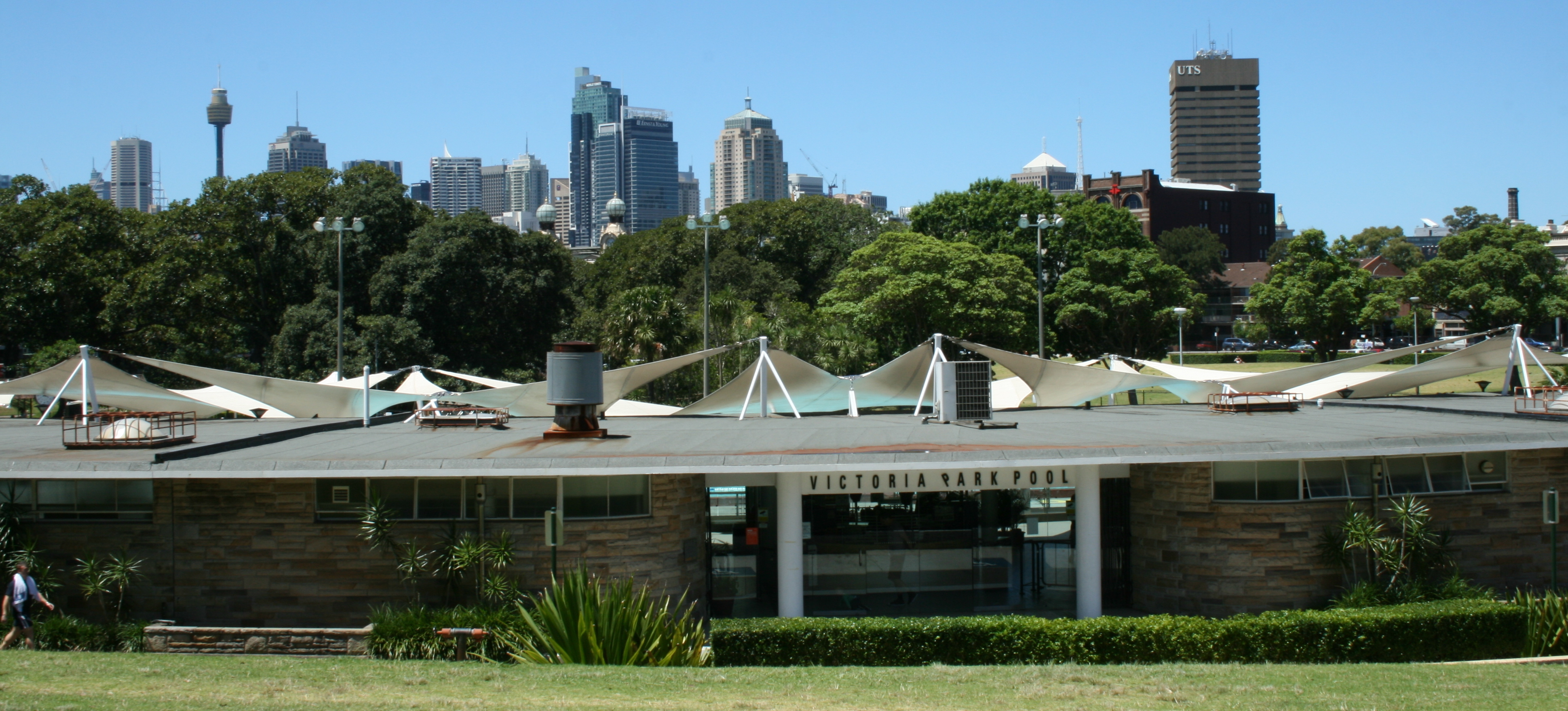
Victoria Park Pool

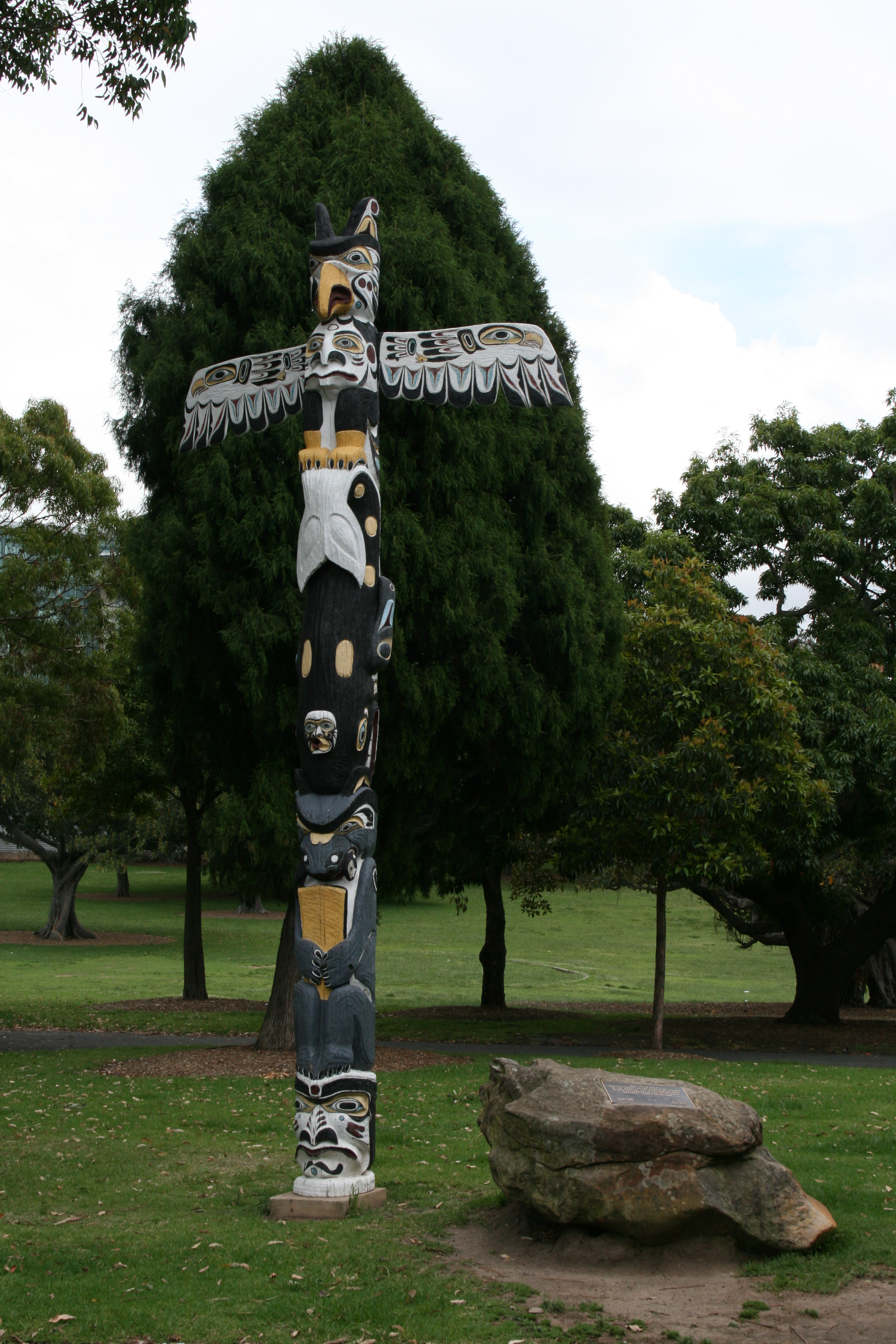
A Canadian totem pole located in the southern corner of the park

== See also ==
- Parks in Sydney
