= Central Sydney Intensive English High School =

Coordinates: 33.8998°S 151.1938°E

Location
- 55 Mitchell Road; Alexandria, New South Wales; Australia

Information
- Type: Public, secondary, co-educational, day school
- Motto: Harmony and Progress
- Religious affiliation: None
- Established: 1977 (Language and Reception Centre); 2002 (high school)
- Principal: Arety Dassaklis
- Staff: ~34
- Enrolment: ~143
- Campus: Urban
- Colours: Blue and yellow
- Website: website

Central Sydney Intensive English High School (CSIEHS), formerly known as Cleveland Street Intensive English High School, is an ESL high school located in the Inner Sydney suburb of Alexandria, New South Wales, Australia and operated by the New South Wales Department of Education. The school provides intensive English language, settlement, orientation and welfare programs to secondary aged, newly arrived permanent, temporary resident and international students. Settlement support and partnership programs are provided for the school's culturally and linguistically diverse parent community. The school's student and parent community come from more than 30 language backgrounds other than English. Bilingual staff support student learning and parent programs. The school's motto "Harmony and Progress" reflects the proactively inclusive education and welfare programs designed to enhance student resilience and achievement.

In 2018, the school moved into temporary buildings on the Park Road campus of the Alexandria Park Community School, to vacate the historic Cleveland Street Model School site on the corner of Cleveland and Chalmers Streets, Redfern for a new, 14-storey inner city high school on that site, to be called Inner Sydney High School. The CSIEHS school relocated to its new, permanent campus on Mitchell Road early in 2019.

== Students ==
Students attending the school can come from as many as 100 different countries, bringing with them a great diversity of languages, customs and beliefs. Students are all newly arrived, non-English speaking background students of high school age. They study at the school for between 15 and 50 weeks at the school at which point most students transfer to other government high schools in order to complete their studies in the School Certificate or Higher School Certificate. Some students will choose to begin other courses of study at other institutions, such as Technical and Further Education TAFE, and some may go directly to the workplace.

The demographic mix of students is constantly shifting with national and international events, and geopolitics. The student body has been known to include migrants and/or refugees from China, Indonesia, South Korea, South America, Iraq, Sri Lanka, and Sudan.

== Staff ==
The staff consists of a principal, deputy principal, head teachers, classroom teachers, specialist migrant counsellors, and school assistant support staff (administration and bi-lingual). All teachers are trained in at least two methodologies with one being English as a Second Language (ESL). Many of the teachers are also bi-lingual.

== Curriculum ==
=== Departments ===
The curriculum at CSIEHS is based on the Intensive English Program Curriculum Framework, a document which describes an appropriate progression of English language acquisition and the language outcomes essential for students in an intensive English program. The English as a Second Language (ESL) program at this school is taught through the Key Learning Areas (KLAs) to assist students in preparation for their completion of the Record of School Achievement and/or Higher School Certificate. The program is taught through the following KLAs:

- English
- Mathematics
- Science
- Human Society and its Environment
- Technology and Applied Studies
  - Information and Communications Technology
- Creative Arts
  - Visual Arts
  - Music
- Personal Development, Health
  and Physical Education (PDHPE)
- Electives (Stage 6 only)
  - Chemistry
  - Chinese for Background Speakers
  - Computer Applications
  - English for academic purposes
  - Information Processes and Technology
  - Maths Extension Plus
  - Music
  - Physics
  - Society and Culture
  - Software Design and Development
  - Sport, Lifestyle and Recreation
  - Visual Arts
  - Work Studies

=== Sport ===
The PDHPE program at CSIEHS encompasses a range of sports that students participate in, including:

- Basketball
- Cricket
- Football
- Volleyball
- Table Tennis
- Swimming
- Tennis
- Badminton

== History and architecture ==
=== 1851 ===
The Australian gold rushes of 1850s increased the Australian population dramatically. In 1851, some land was reserved in the "Cleveland Paddocks" for a school to be established.

=== 1856 ===
In 1856, "temporary" pre-fabricated galvanised iron buildings were imported from Liverpool, England and erected on the Cleveland Street site. In its first year the school had an enrolment of 215 students. During this time Cleveland Street became one of the four "Model Schools", which included Fort Street, William Street (now closed), and Paddington.

=== 1867 ===
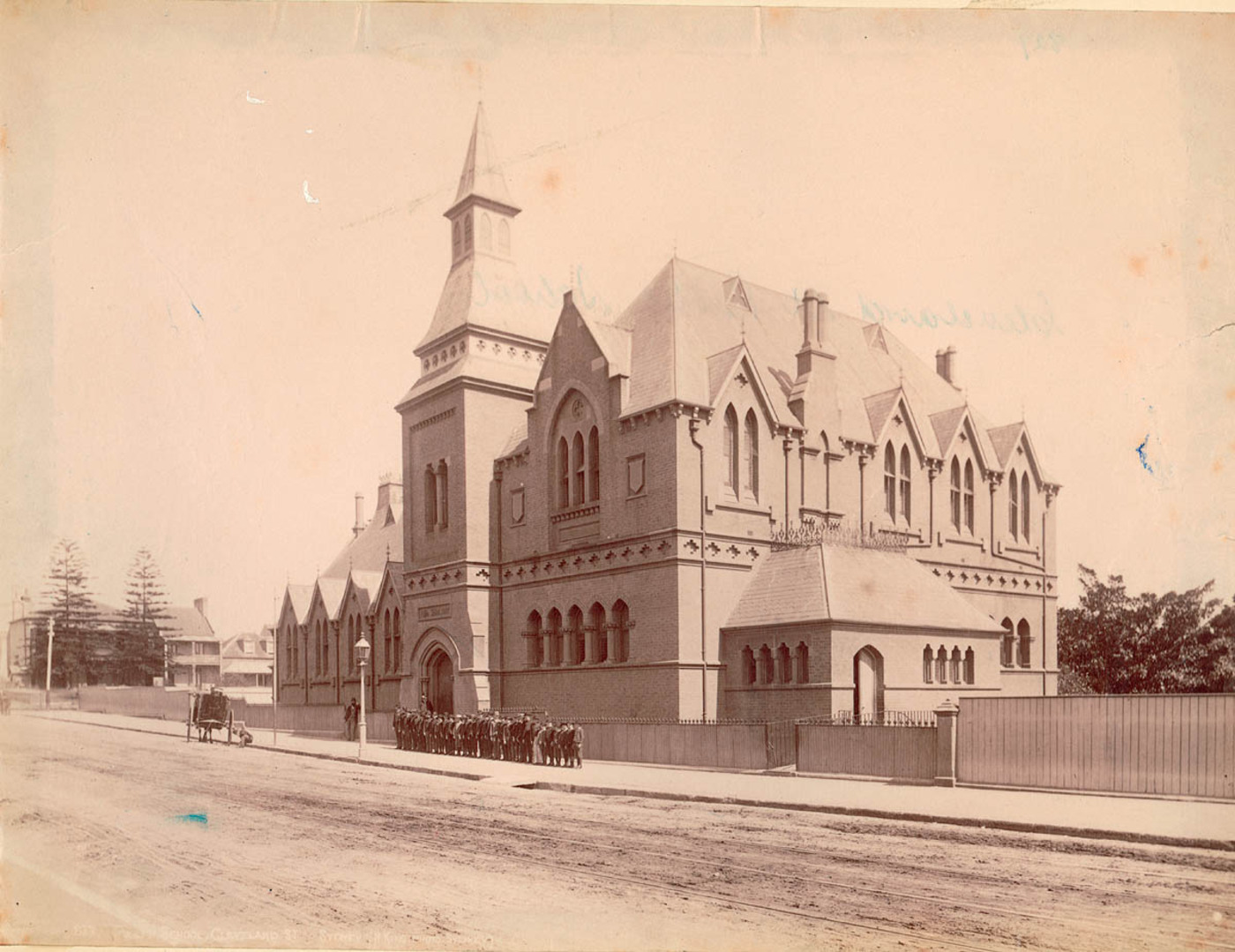
Exterior of Cleveland Street Public School, ca. 1880–1890

Following the 1866 Public Schools Act, the pre-fabricated galvanised iron buildings at Cleveland Street were demolished to be replaced by substantial buildings. These took 14 months to construct and have been described as Gothic Revival in architecture.

=== 1891 ===
An additional wing was added to the school in what has been described as "Moderated Romanesque Style". It was at this time that the City Council granted the school its own access to and use of Prince Alfred Park as a playground.

=== 1909 ===
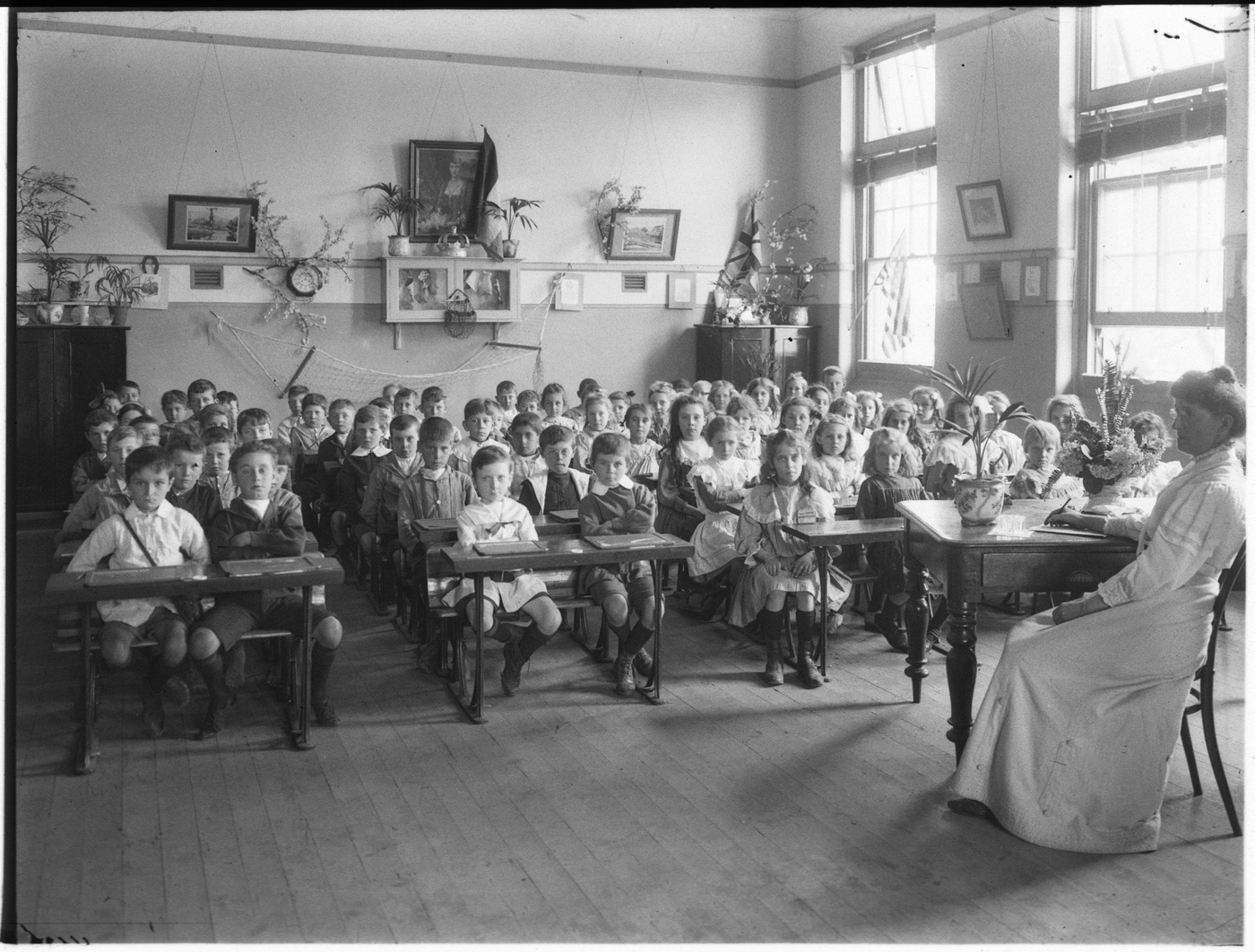
Interior of the infants class at Cleveland Street Public School, ca. 1909

Due to new ideas in education such as manual training and the teaching of science, the school received another building addition with specialist rooms called "shops".

=== 1913 ===
The school became an Intermediate High School for boys and girls.

=== 1924 ===
Another building was erected on the site, this time a three-storey building said to resemble an "egg-crate". It added a further eight new classrooms to the boys department.

=== 1956 ===
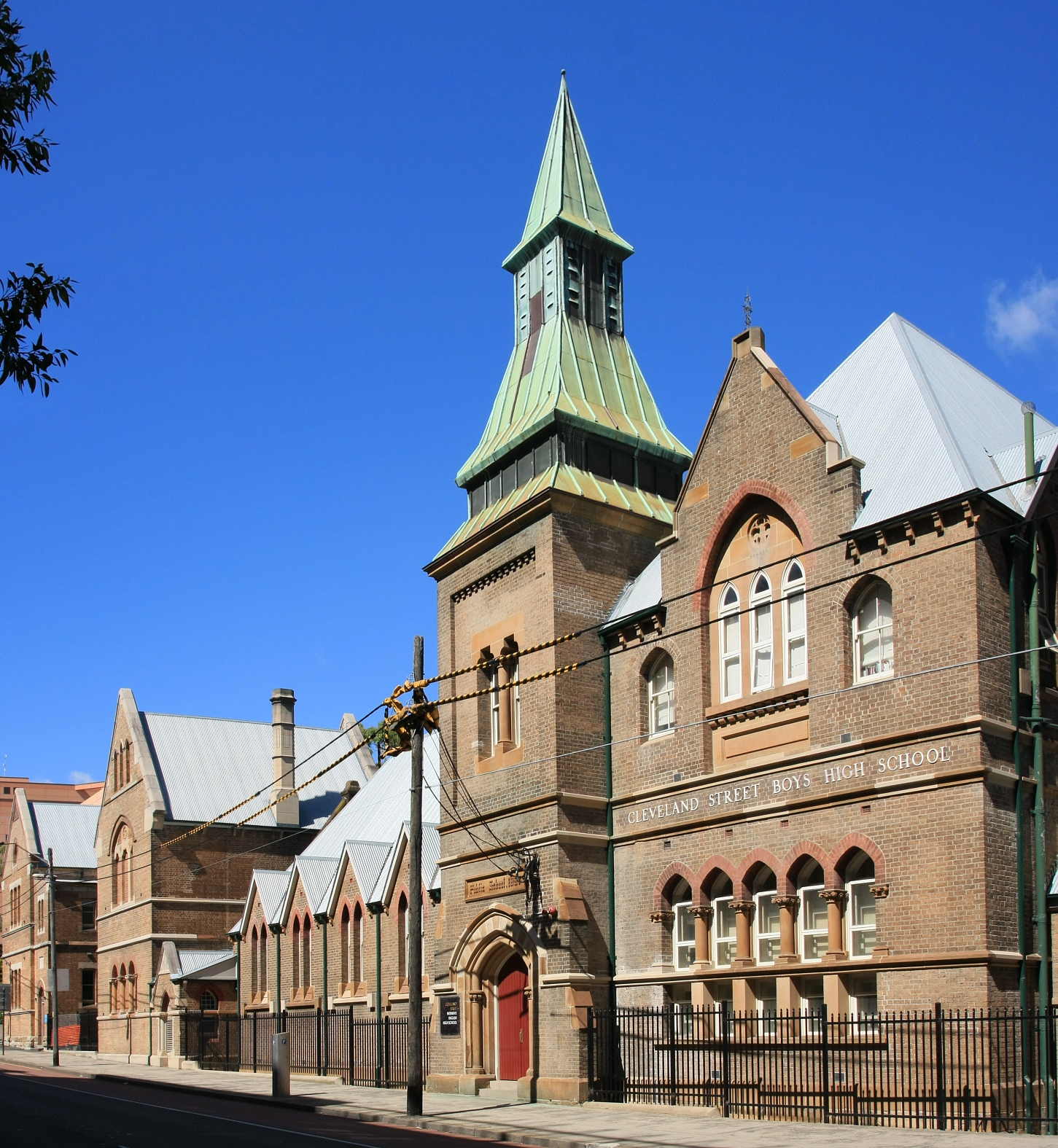
Cleveland Street Boys High

The school became an all boy's high school.

=== 1968 ===
A "modern" building was constructed on the grounds, consisting of three levels and containing specialist rooms.

=== 1980 ===
The high school moved to new grounds and new buildings in the adjacent suburb of Alexandria. The site at Cleveland Street became an annex to the new high school, but with a separate function, that of providing intensive English language tuition for newly arrived migrant students.

=== 2001 ===
The site at Cleveland Street becomes a dedicated high school for intensive English tuition and is named "Cleveland Street Intensive English High School".

== See also ==
- List of government schools in New South Wales
