= Sydney Entertainment Centre =

Multi-purpose venue, located in Haymarket, Sydney, Australia

- Kingdome
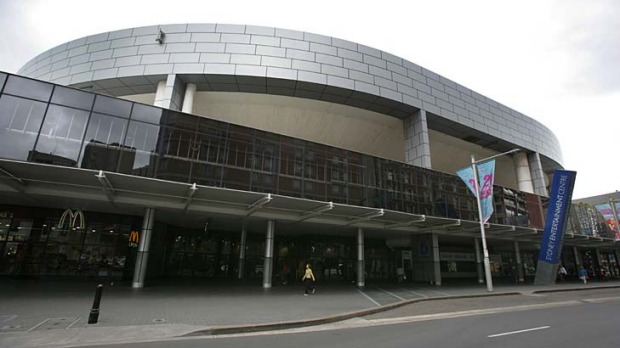
- Exterior view of the venue (c.2015)
- Interactive map of Sydney Entertainment Centre
- Former names: Qantas Credit Union Arena (2014–2015)
- Address: 35 Harbour Street
- Location: Haymarket
- Coordinates: 33°52′42″S 151°12′10″E
- Owner: Sydney Harbour Foreshore Authority; Rdf Entertainment
- Operator: AEG Ogden
- Capacity: 13,250; 10,517

Construction
- Opened: 1 May 1983
- Closed: 20 December 2015
- Demolished: January 2016
- Cost: $42 million ($223 million in 2022 dollars)
- Architects: Edwards, Madigan, Torzillo and Briggs
- Main contractor: John Holland Group

Tenants
- Sydney Kings (NBL) (1990–1999, 2002–2008, 2010–2015); Sydney Uni Flames (WNBL) (2003–2015)

Website
- Former Venue Website

Sydney Entertainment Centre, later known as Qantas Credit Union Arena, was a multi-purpose arena located in Haymarket, Sydney, Australia. It opened in May 1983, to replace Sydney Stadium, which had been demolished in 1970 to make way for the Eastern Suburbs railway line. The centre was owned by the Sydney Harbour Foreshore Authority, which administered the neighbouring Darling Harbour area, and managed under a lease.

It was one of Sydney's larger concert venues, licensed to accommodate over 13,000 people as a conventional theatre or 8,000 as a theatre-in-the-round. It was the largest permanent concert venue in Sydney until 1999, when the Sydney SuperDome opened at Sydney Olympic Park. The venue averaged attendances of 1 million people each year and hosted concerts, family shows, sporting events and corporate events. It closed the month before its demolition in January 2016.

== Construction ==
The construction of the Sydney Entertainment Centre was orchestrated by Neville Wran, who appointed Sir Asher Joel as chairman of the project. The site was formerly occupied by fruit and vegetable markets, which were vacated by 1975. Construction began in 1979, contracted by the John Holland Group. A ska concert sponsored by BWIU was held for construction workers at one point. Construction was completed in 1983, and the venue was opened to the public on May 1st.

== Notable events ==
The first concert held just days after the opening was John Denver in May 1983. The concert was sold out. Over the coming years Denver played several concerts at the Centre.

In December 1983, Cold Chisel played its final Last Stand concert.

During its operation other notable acts were Bob Dylan, Tom Petty, Queen, John Mellencamp, Dire Straits, Pink Floyd, Robert Plant, Michael Crawford, Linkin Park, Anthony Warlow. The venue was popular with local and international performers.

On December 7th and 8th, 1998, children's music group The Wiggles performed at the SEC as the finale concert in the Toot Toot Show! Both shows were filmed and were featured in various episodes of their second television series. They would release The Wiggly Big Show on September 6, 1999, in Australia followed by a UK release in February 2001, which featured footage from this show (with the UK release being named It's a Wiggly, Wiggly World! Live in Concert with some edits). They would have another concert filmed here on 20 December 2003 as the closing act of their Lights, Camera, Action! tour. This would be released on home media in the US and Australia in 2005 under the title Live Hot Potatoes!.

Elton John has played numerous concerts there over the years, including twelve dates in 1986 with an orchestra at Haymarket Arena. The latter shows were the last he performed prior to throat surgery. He played 46 shows at the venue and was the final artist to perform at the venue before its demolition in December 2015.

David Bowie played at the venue for a week in November 1987 during his worldwide Glass Spider Tour, and performances from several nights were included on video and CD on Glass Spider (1988).

== Sporting events ==
As a sporting venue, the SEC was best known as the home venue of the Sydney Kings who play in the National Basketball League (NBL) over 3 stints. The Kings moved from the smaller (5,006 capacity) State Sports Centre in Homebush Bay in 1990 and remained until moving to the Super Dome in 1999. The Kings then returned to the SEC in 2002 and would enjoy immediate success winning the NBL championship in 2002–03, 2003–04 and 2004–05. The team remained until 2008 when they folded due to financial difficulties, but when the club returned to the NBL in 2010 they again made the SEC their home which lasted until the centre's closing in 2015.

In 1995, the Entertainment Centre hosted Game 4 of a 5-game international basketball series between the Australian Boomers and the Magic Johnson All-Stars in front of a sellout crowd of almost 12,000 fans. Despite the All-Stars being a collection of former NBA players, and with Magic Johnson not playing due to a calf injury, the crowd was actually behind the All-Stars on the night. They were treated to a game that went into overtime with the All-Stars keeping their unbeaten record intact with a 97–94 win. Before the game Magic Johnson apologised to the fans from centre court for not being able to play and called the SEC "A good sized gym that they can be proud of".

Other sports such as boxing, professional wrestling, tennis and indoor motocross have also been held. Australian boxer Jeff Fenech won a number of World title matches at the centre during the 1980s, While in July 2011, the IBO Cruiser-weight title match between Antonio Tarver and Danny Green took place at the SEC.

The SEC hosted the 1991 World Netball Championships, as well as games during the 1994 FIBA Women's World Championship including all Finals games and 3rd place playoff game.

At the 2000 Summer Olympics, the SEC was one of two venues for volleyball tournament.

Further, the facility co-hosted the FIBA Oceania Championship in 2007 and 2011. Both times, the Australian national basketball team won the gold medal.

== Closure ==
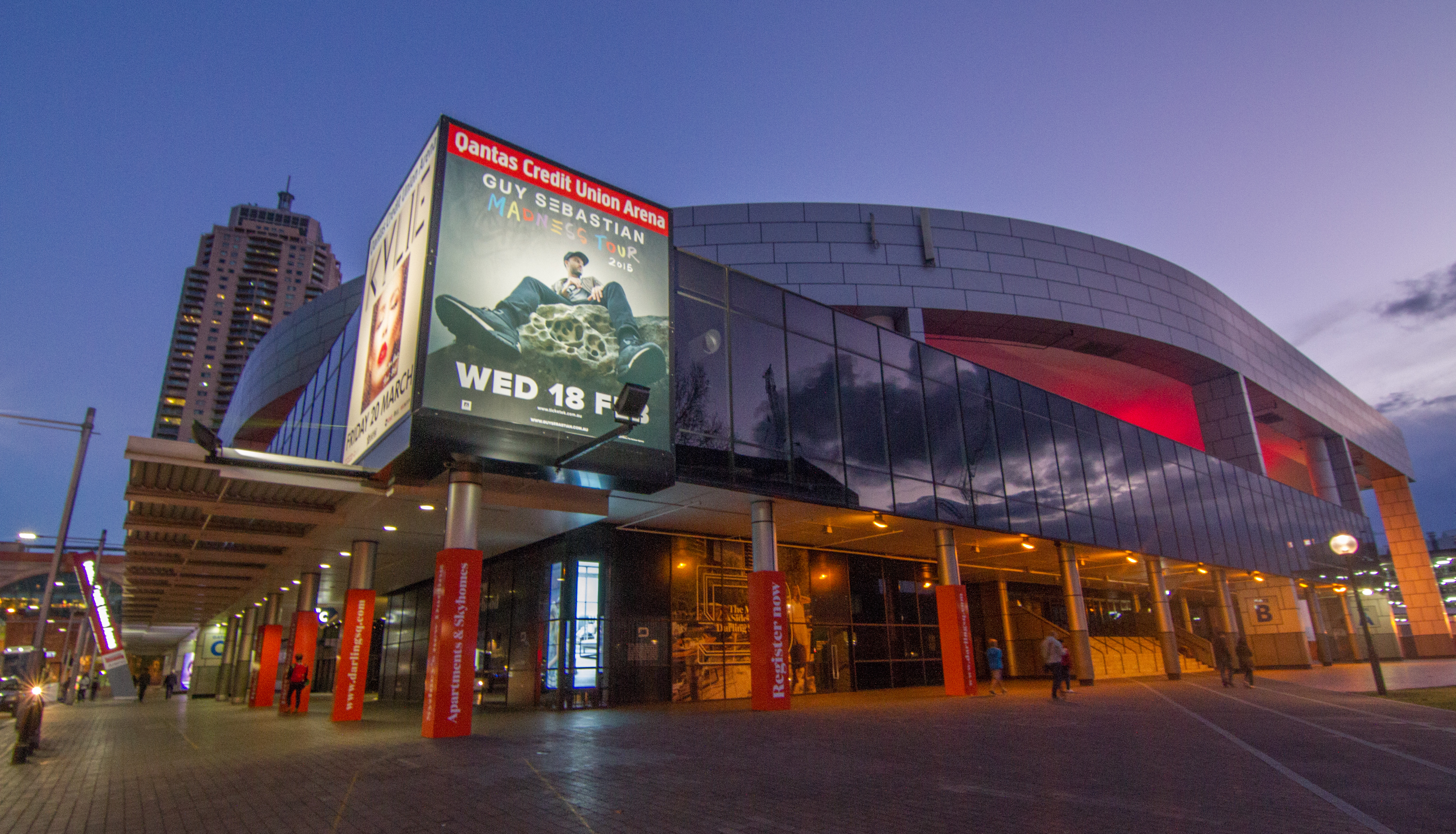
The arena at night in August 2014

As part of a redevelopment of the Darling Harbour precinct, the Sydney Entertainment Centre was planned to be demolished in 2013, along with the surrounding buildings, but was granted a reprieve. The final concerts were played by Cold Chisel and Elton John on the weekend of 18/19 December 2015. Demolition commenced in January 2016. The Darling Square residential development replaced the centre.

Replacement facilities were built closer towards the harbour surrounding Darling Quarter, the nearby 9,000-seat theatre at the International Convention Centre Sydney, as part of a $3 billion redevelopment of Darling Harbour. It also contains an exhibition centre and convention centre. The opening of the new facilities occurred in late 2016.

== Bibliography ==
- Pegg, Nicholas (2016). The Complete David Bowie New Edition: Expanded and Updated. London: Titan Books. ISBN 9781785655333.
