= Cleveland Street, Sydney =

Road in Sydney, New South Wales, Australia

Cleveland Street, Sydney New South Wales
- Coordinates: 33.887684°S 151.193140°E (West end); 33.895199°S 151.221556°E (East end)

General information
- Type: Street
- Length: 2.8 km (1.7 mi)
- Gazetted: February 1933
- Maintained by: Transport for NSW
- Former route number: Metroad 4 (1992–2000); State Route 11 (1974–1992); Ring Road 1 (1964–1974); (Chippendale–Surry Hills)

Major junctions
- West end: City Road; Camperdown, Sydney
- Regent Street; Elizabeth Street; South Dowling Street; Anzac Parade
- East end: Lang Road; Moore Park, Sydney

Location(s)
- Major suburbs: Chippendale, Darlington, Redfern, Surry Hills

Cleveland Street is a busy thoroughfare located to the south of the Sydney central business district in New South Wales, Australia. The street is named after Captain Cleveland, an officer of the 73rd regiment.

== Route ==
Cleveland Street commences at its intersection with City Road in Chippendale and heads in an easterly direction as a four-lane, single carriageway road through Darlington, over the railway lines between Central and Redfern stations and east through Surry Hills, crossing the Eastern Distributor and South Darling Street, to eventually terminate at the intersection with Anzac Parade and Lang Road, Moore Park.

== History ==
Governor Macquarie granted a substantial parcel of land in the Surry Hills and Redfern area to Charles Smith in 1809, who established Cleveland Gardens, as either a market garden or nursery in the area. Daniel Cooper purchased approximately five hectares (twelve acres) from Smith and built the heritage-listed Cleveland House in the early 1820s. The decision in 1850 to build Redfern terminus brought industry to the area and resulted in the subdivision of many of the gentlemen's estates in the neighbouring suburb of Surry Hills.

Prior to the 1840s, maps marked Cleveland Street, from Chippendale to Moore Park, as the unsurveyed 'Government Road'.

The passing of the Main Roads Act of 1924 through the Parliament of New South Wales provided for the declaration of Main Roads, roads partially funded by the State government through the Main Roads Board (MRB). With the subsequent passing of the Main Roads (Amendment) Act of 1929 to provide for additional declarations of State Highways and Trunk Roads, the Department of Main Roads (having succeeded the MRB in 1932) declared Main Road 330 from the intersection with City Road to the intersection with Dowling Street (today South Dowling Street) in Surry Hills on 21 February 1933, and extended east to the intersection with Anzac Parade on 2 December 1964.

The passing of the Roads Act of 1993 updated road classifications and the way they could be declared within New South Wales. Under this act, Cleveland Street retains its declaration as Main Road 330.

The route was part of Sydney's first Ring Roads, and was allocated Ring Road 1 between Abercrombie Street and South Dowling Street in 1964; this was replaced by State Route 11 in 1974, and then Metroad 4 in 1992. Metroad 4 was later re-aligned along City West Link on its completion in 2000; Cleveland Street has remained without an allocation since.

== Education ==
In 1851, some land was reserved in the "Cleveland Paddocks" for a school to be established. Located on the corner of Cleveland and Chalmers streets, the Cleveland Street Public School was established in prefabricated iron buildings in 1856, as a model school. New sandstone Gothic buildings were constructed in 1867-68, which remain, along with later buildings on the site. The school became an intermediate school in 1913 and later a high school. In 1977 the site was repurposed as an intensive English language tuition centre for migrant students. In 2001 the Cleveland Street site became a dedicated high school for intensive English tuition and was named the Cleveland Street Intensive English High School. A $110-million redevelopment of the site was completed in late 2020 and the Inner Sydney High School was opened in 2021 to accommodate 1,200 students in a 14-storey vertical high school building.

Towards the eastern terminus of Cleveland Street, in Moore Park, Sydney Girls High School and Sydney Boys High School are co-located on adjacent sites.

== Transport ==
Until 1958, electric trams ran down the length of Cleveland Street, when they were replaced by motor buses. The area between Crown and Bourke streets is home to several pubs and an increasing number of restaurants.

Traffic volumes vary, depending on the segment of Cleveland Street. Near Prince Alfred Park the average traffic movements in 2016 for both east and west-bound vehicles was 17,500. Further east, between South Dowling Street and Anzac Parade, 2016 average traffic volumes peaked at 20,000 vehicles west-bound.

== Major intersections ==
Cleveland Street is entirely contained within the City of Sydney local government area.

Location	km	mi	Destinations	Notes
Camperdown–Chippendale–Darlington tripoint	0.0	0.0	City Road (A36) – Ultimo, Newtown	Western terminus of street
Chippendale–Darlington–Redfern tripoint	0.5	0.31	Abercrombie Street – Ultimo, Darlington	One-way into Abercrombie Street northbound
Chippendale–Redfern–Surry Hills tripoint	0.8	0.50	Regent Street – Ultimo, Redfern	
Chippendale–Redfern–Surry Hills tripoint	0.8	0.50	Main Suburban railway line	
Redfern–Surry Hills boundary	1.2	0.75	Chalmers Street – Waterloo, Haymarket	One-way northbound only
Redfern–Surry Hills boundary	1.4	0.87	Elizabeth Street – Waterloo, Sydney CBD	One-way southbound only
Redfern–Surry Hills boundary	1.9	1.2	Crown Street -Woolloomooloo, Surry Hills	
Redfern–Surry Hills boundary	2.0	1.2	Bourke Street - Woolloomooloo, Alexandria	
Redfern–Surry Hills–Moore Park tripoint	2.3	1.4	South Dowling Street - Darlinghurst, Zetland to Eastern Distributor (M1) - Wahroonga, North Sydney, Kogarah, Heathcote, Sydney Airport	
Moore Park	2.8	1.7	Anzac Parade – Paddington, Kingsford, La Perouse	
Moore Park	2.8	1.7	Lang Road - Woollahra	Eastern terminus of street
Incomplete access; Route transition

== Gallery ==
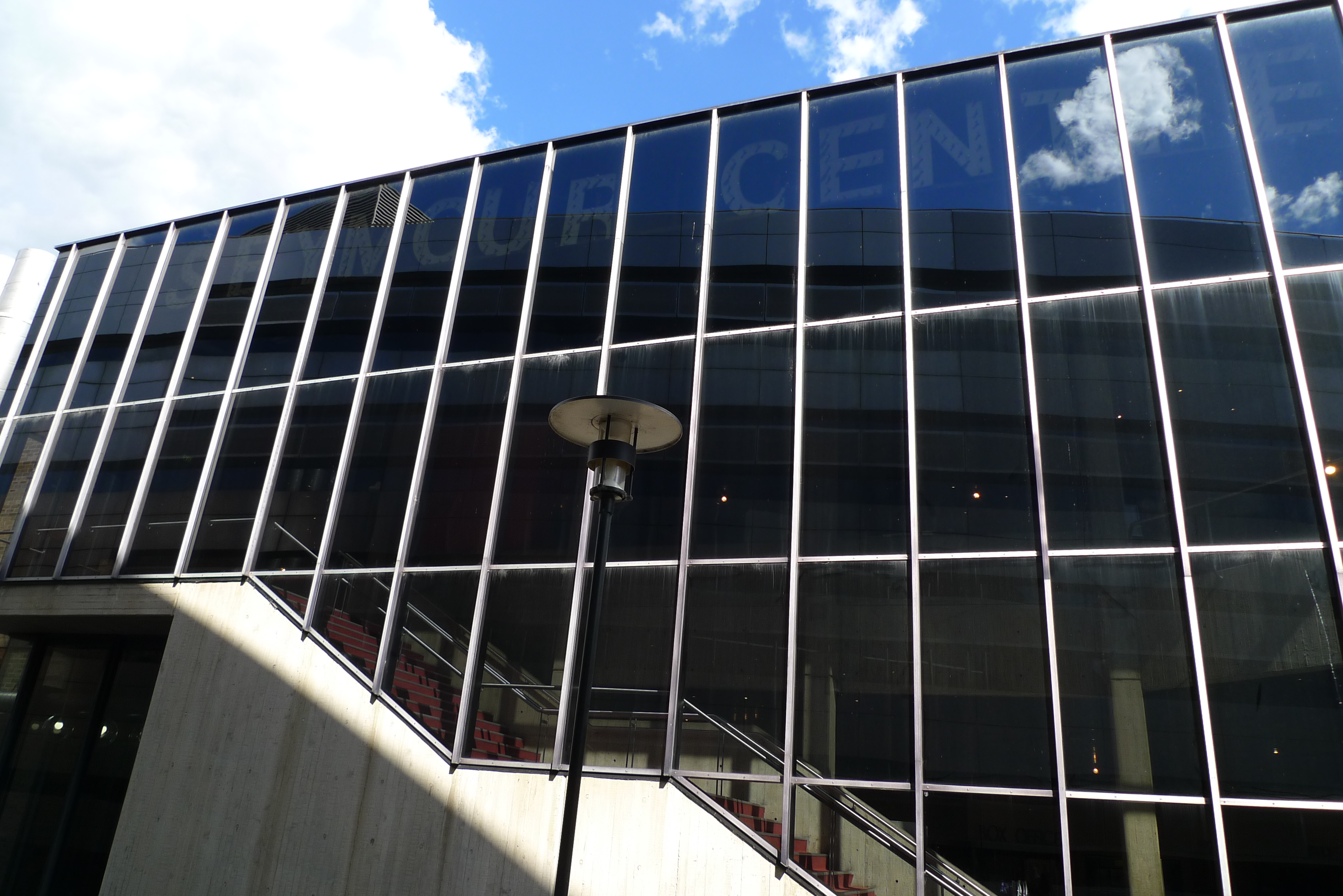
Seymour Centre, Cleveland Street, Chippendale

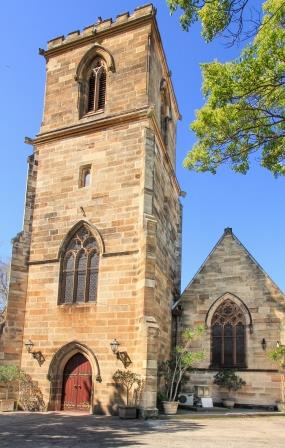
Cathedral of the Annunciation of Our Lady, Cleveland Street, Surry Hills

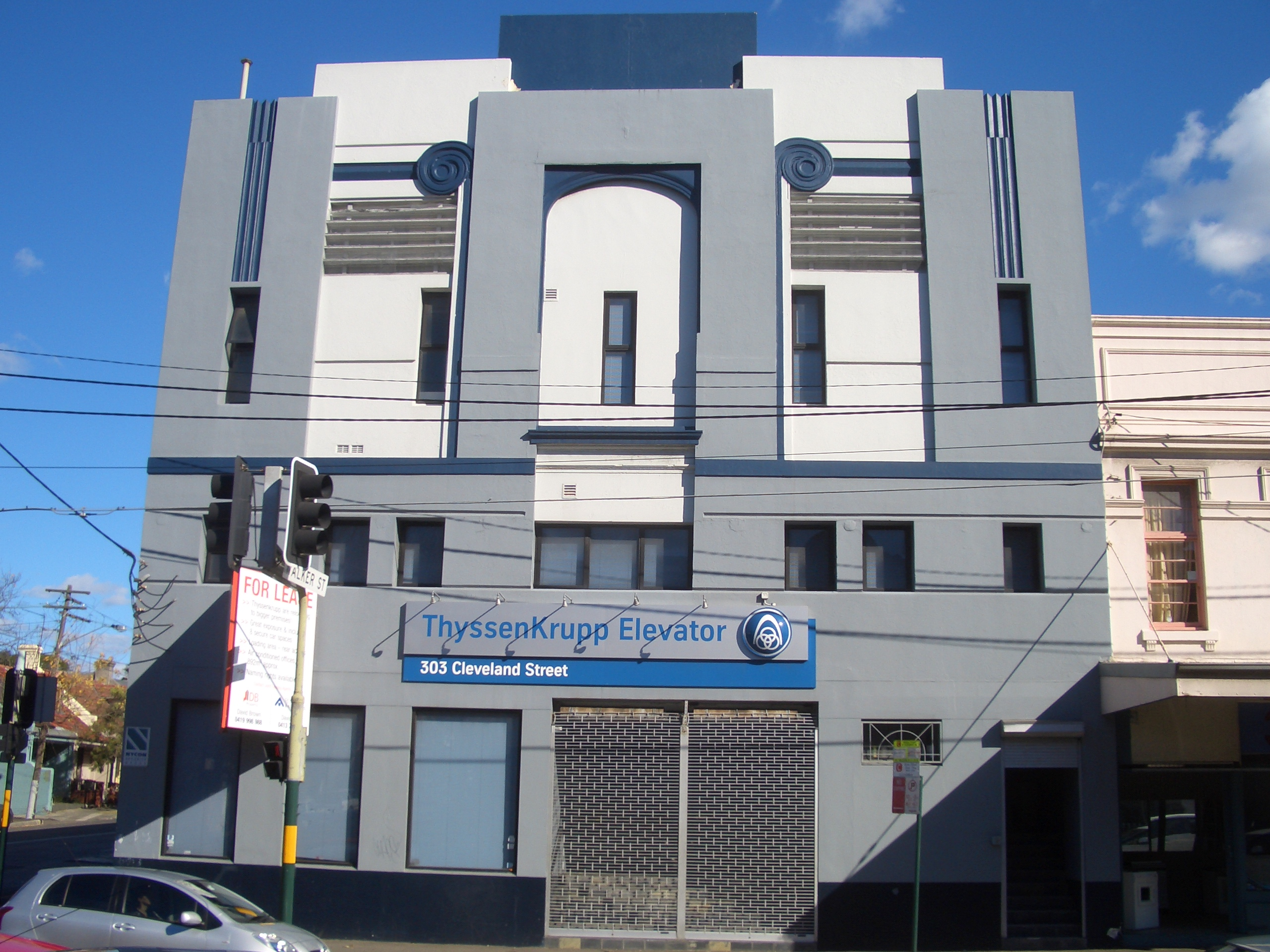
Former Art Deco cinema in Cleveland Street, Redfern

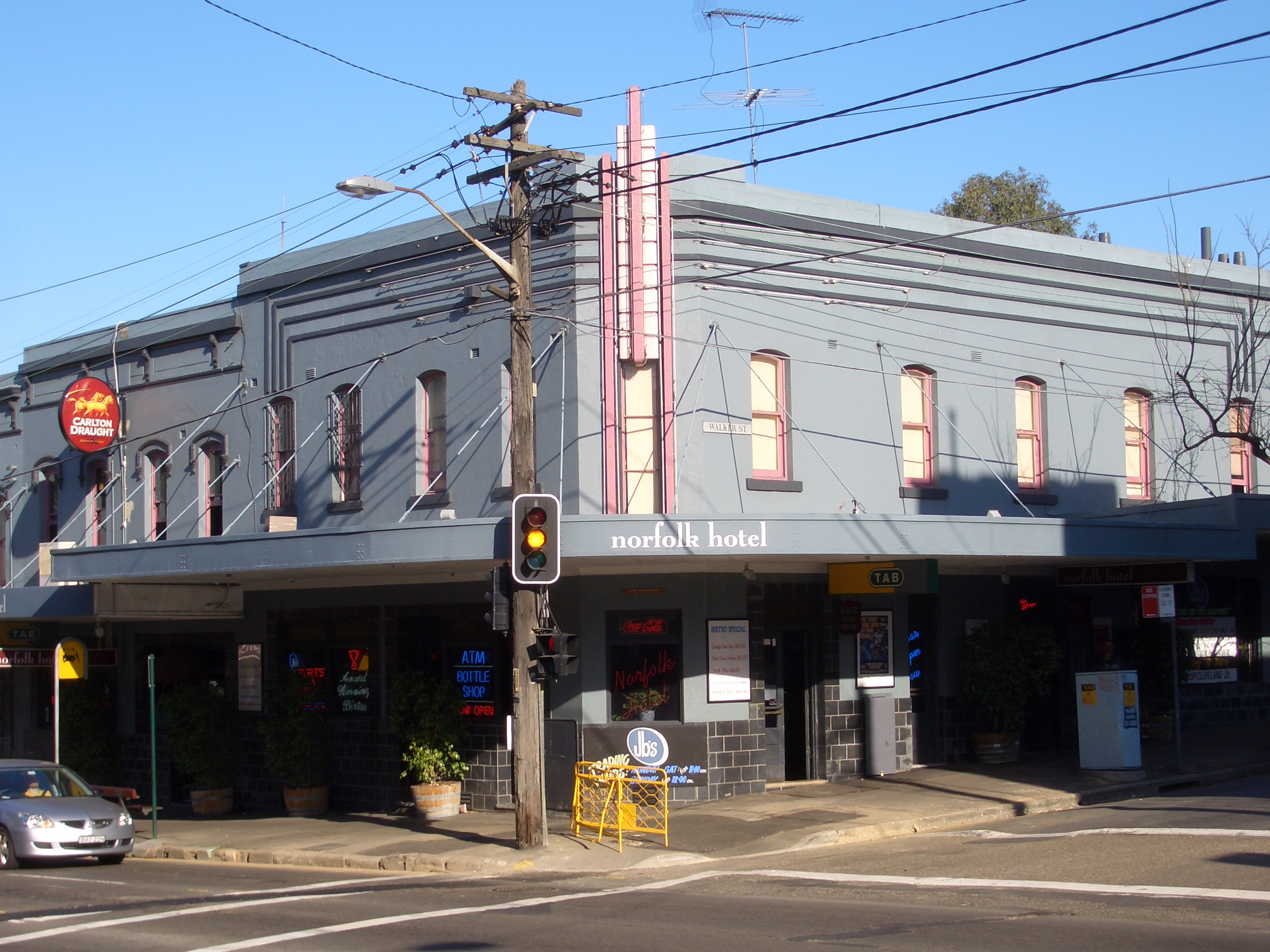
Norfolk Hotel, Cleveland Street, Redfern

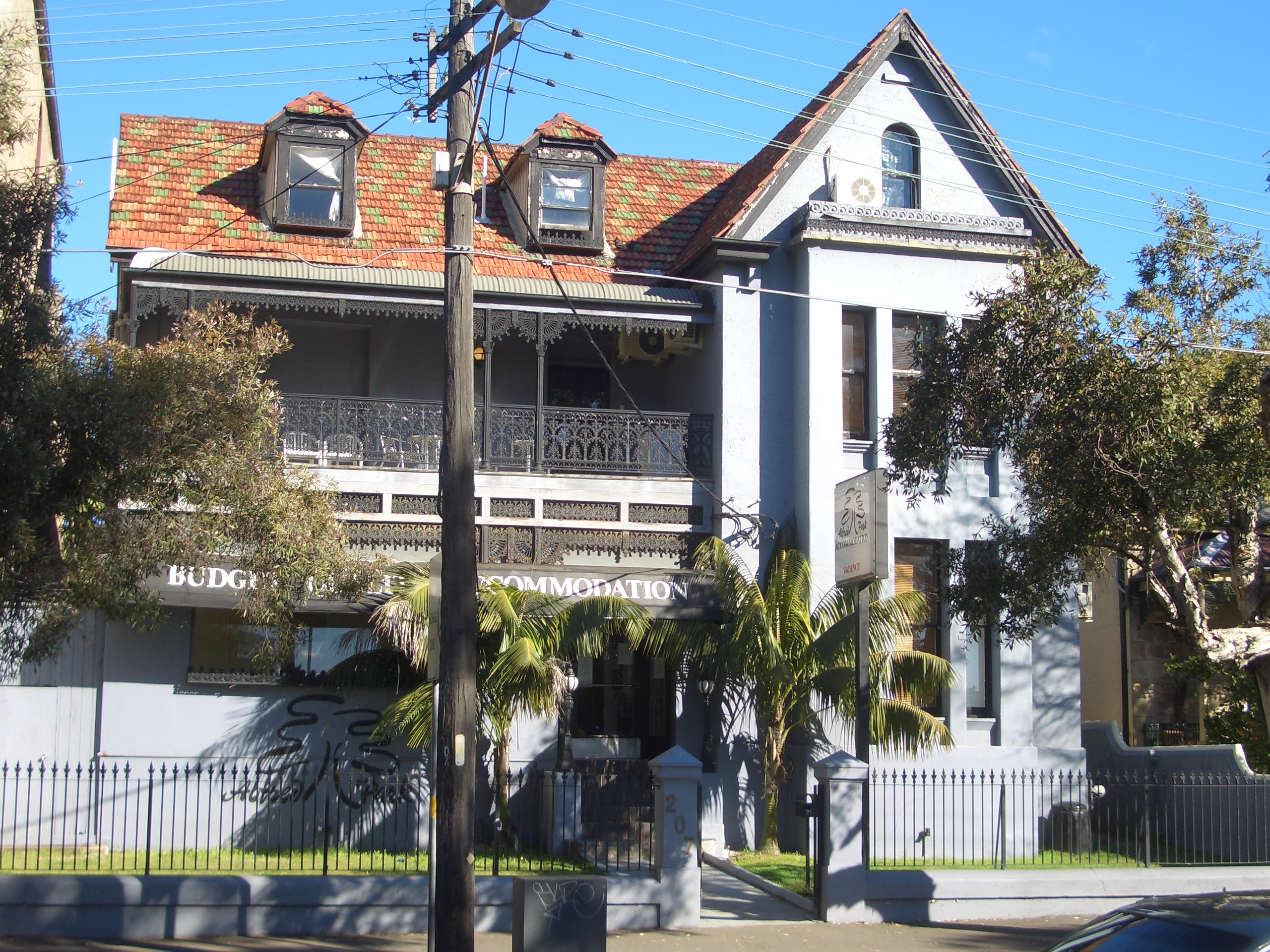
Alfred Park Hotel, Cleveland Street, Redfern

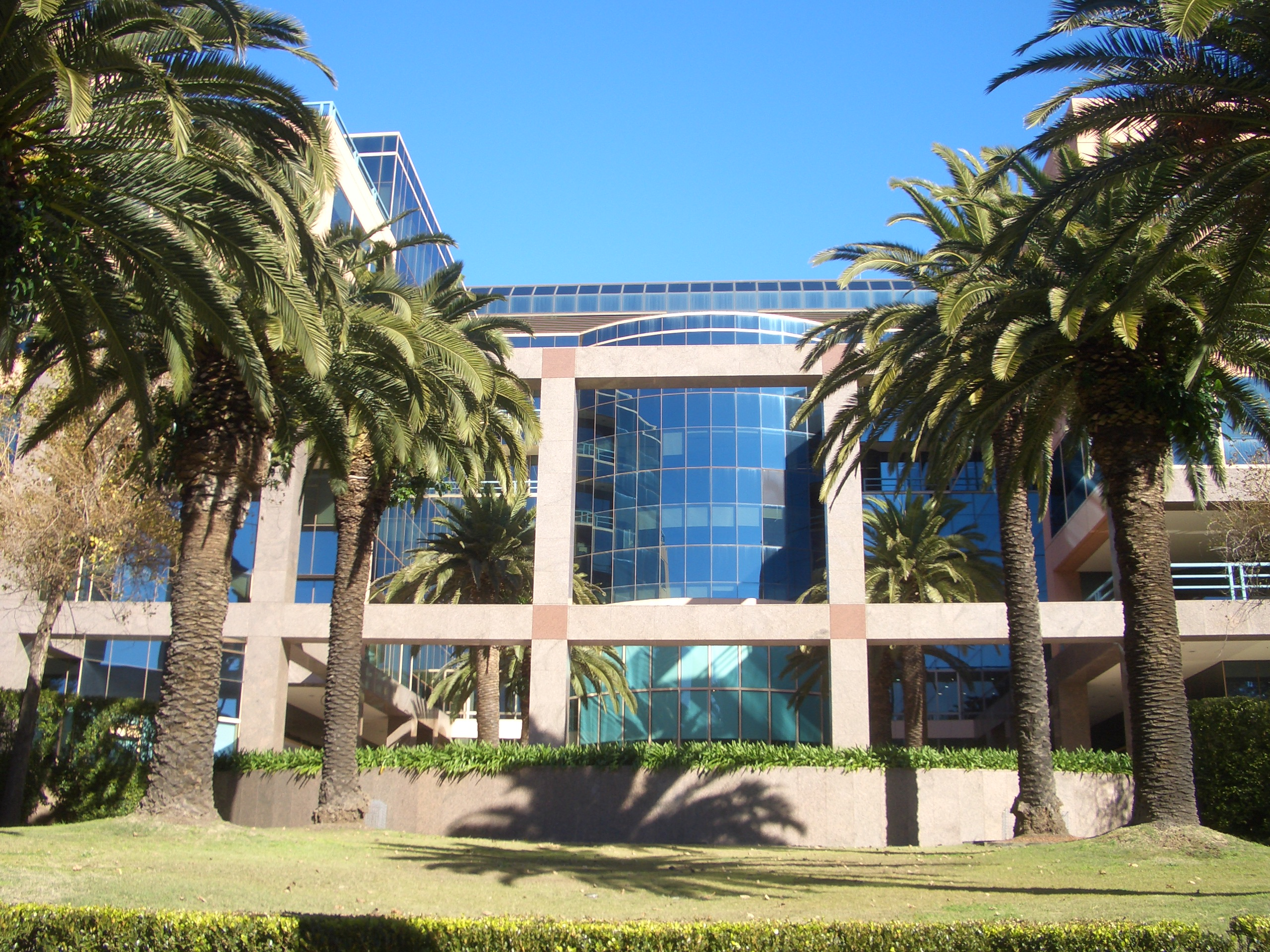
Australia Post New South Wales head office, Cleveland Street, Redfern

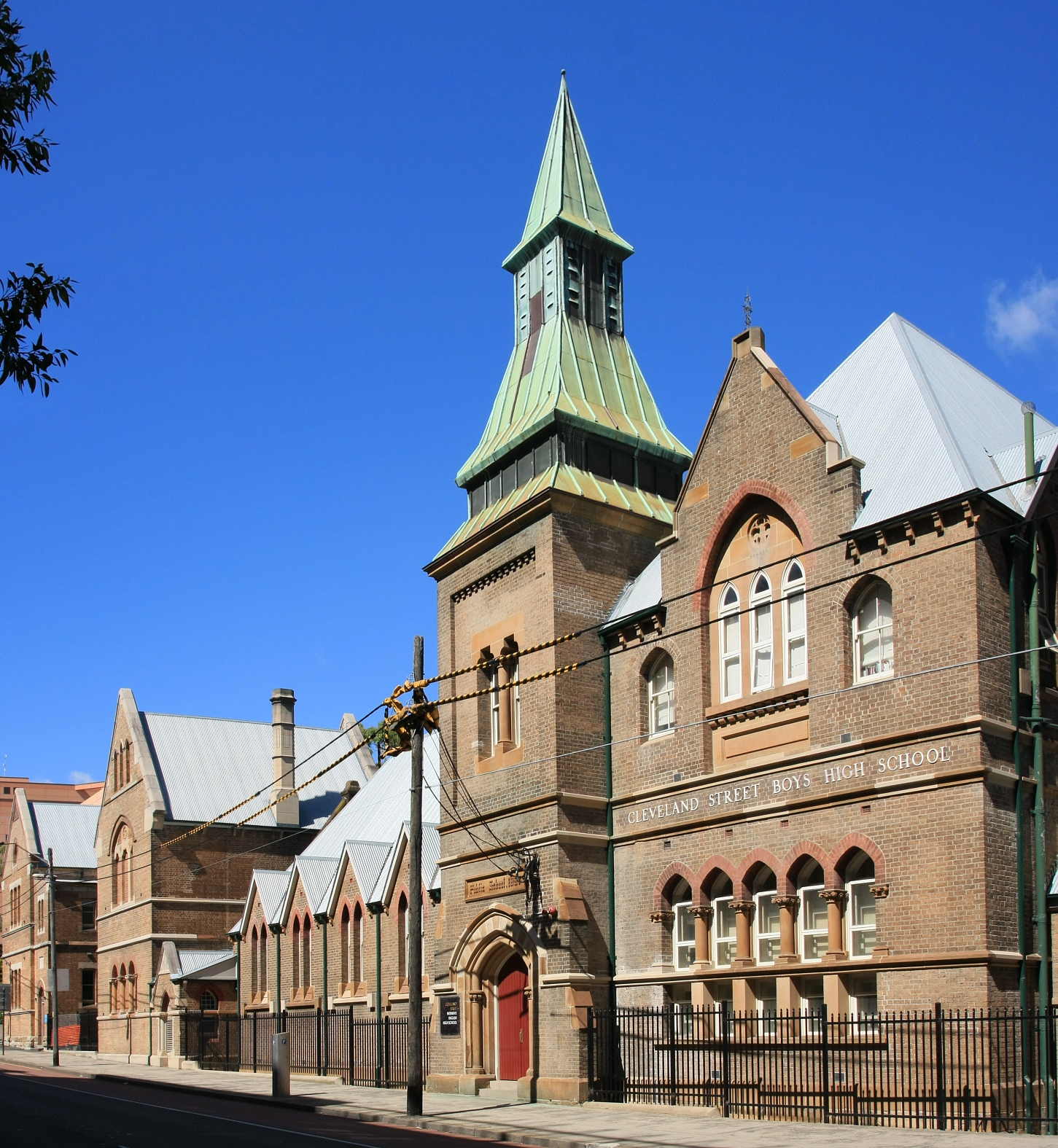
Facade of Inner Sydney High School, formerly the Central Sydney Intensive English High School, and originally the Cleveland Street Model School, Cleveland Street, Surry Hills

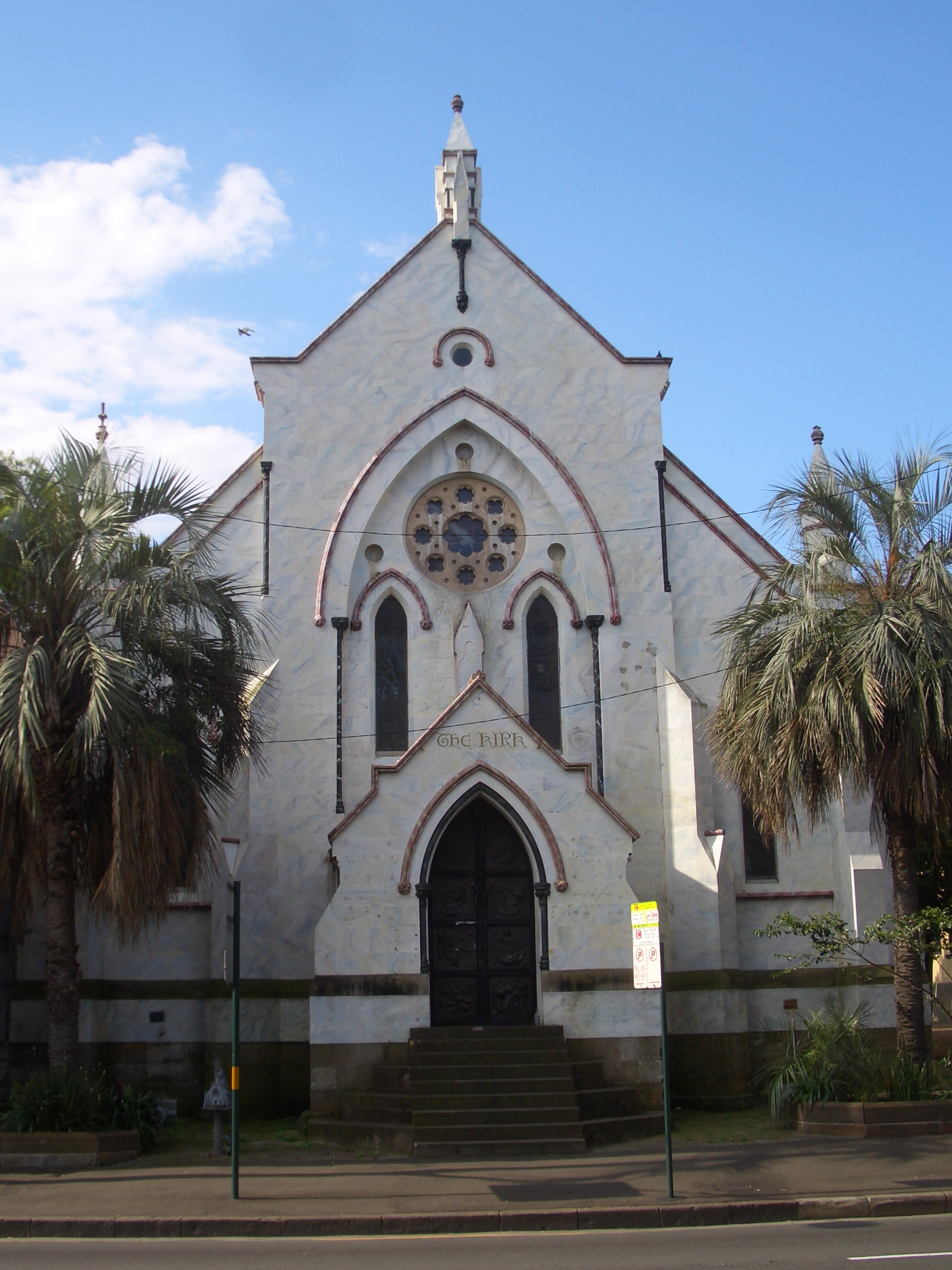
The Kirk, Cleveland Street, Surry Hills

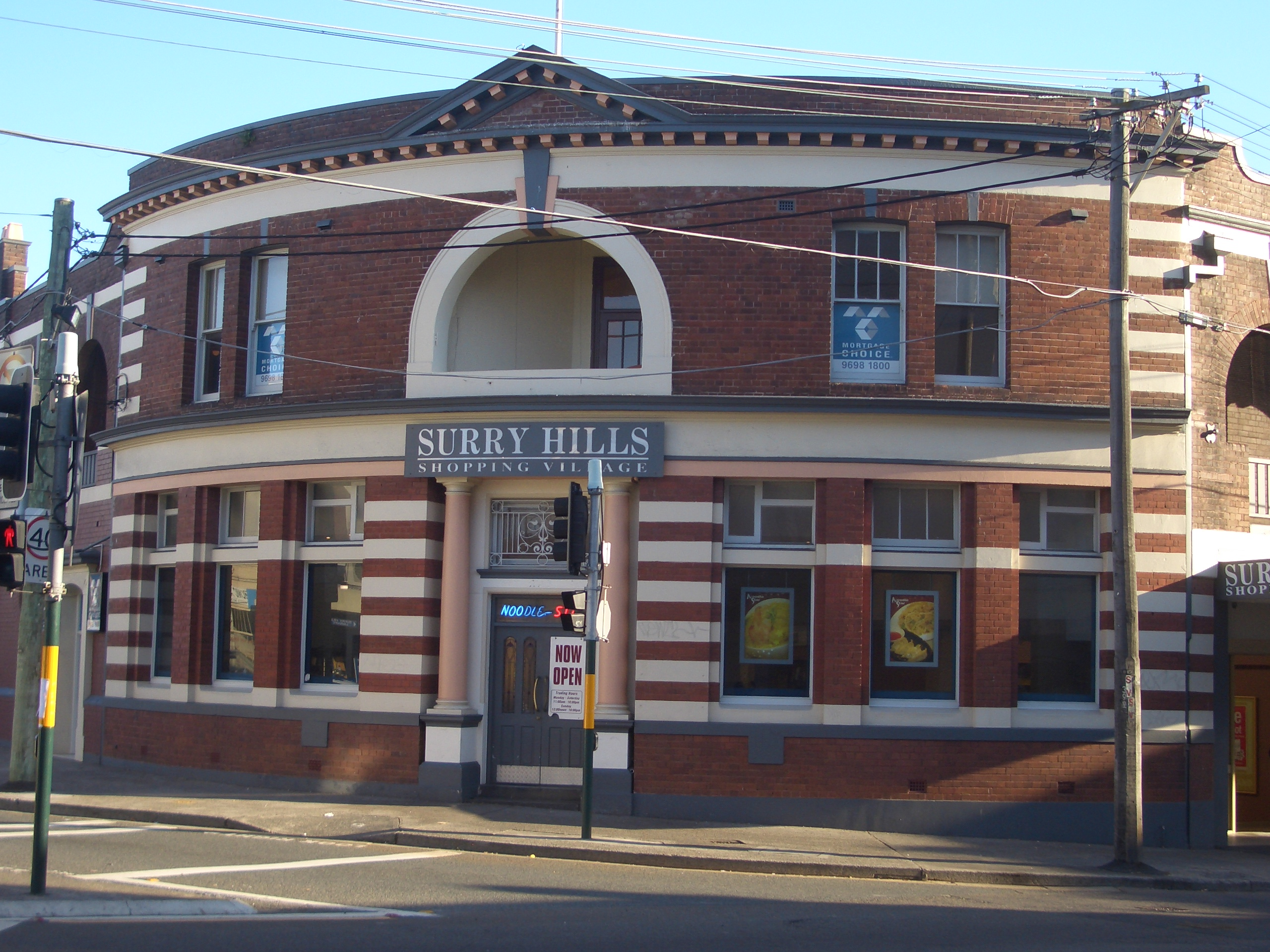
Former facade of the Surry Hills Shopping Village, Cleveland Street, Redfern

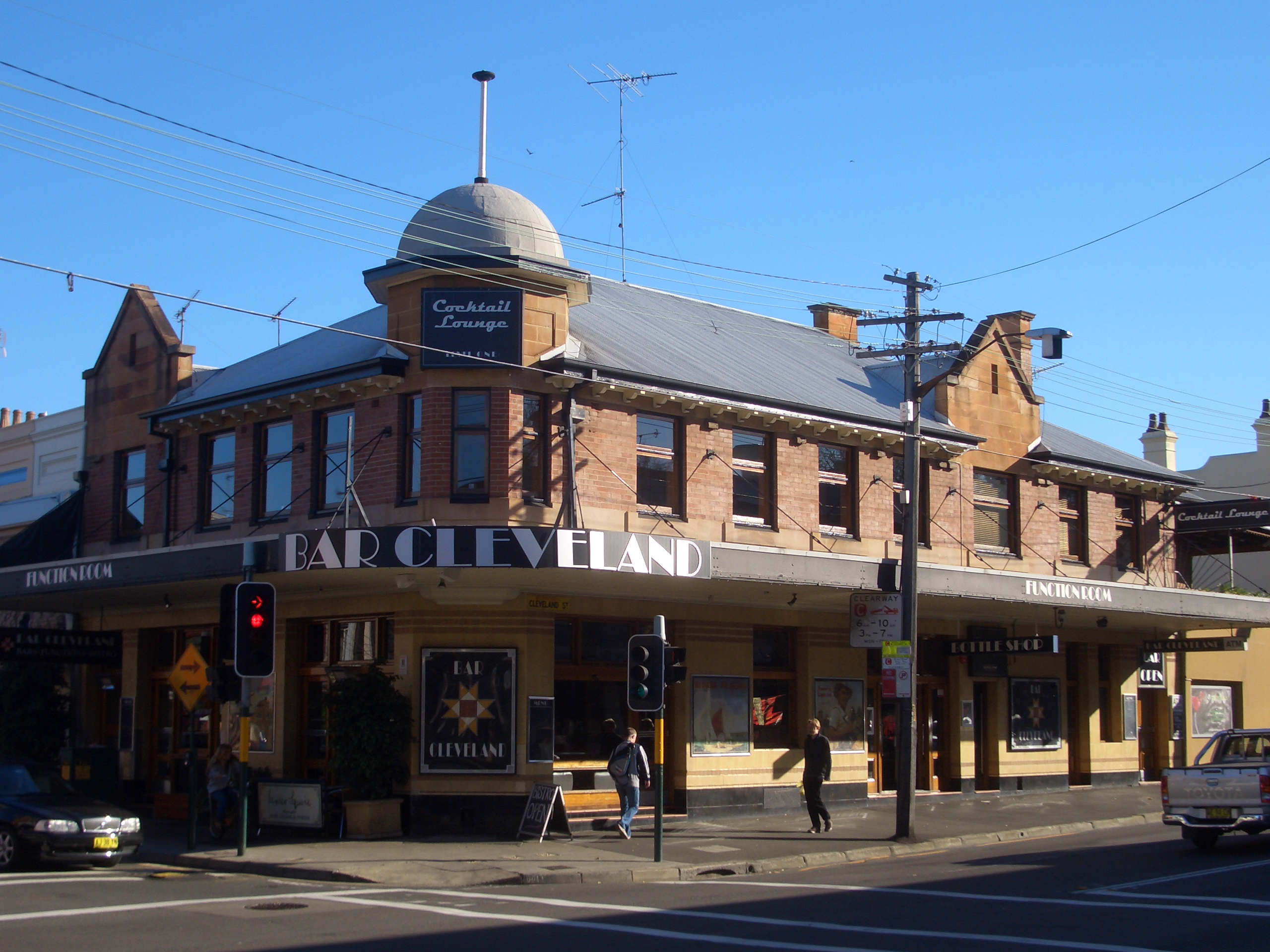
Bar Cleveland, Cleveland Street, Redfern
