= City Road, Sydney =

Road in Sydney, Australia

City Road, Sydney New South Wales
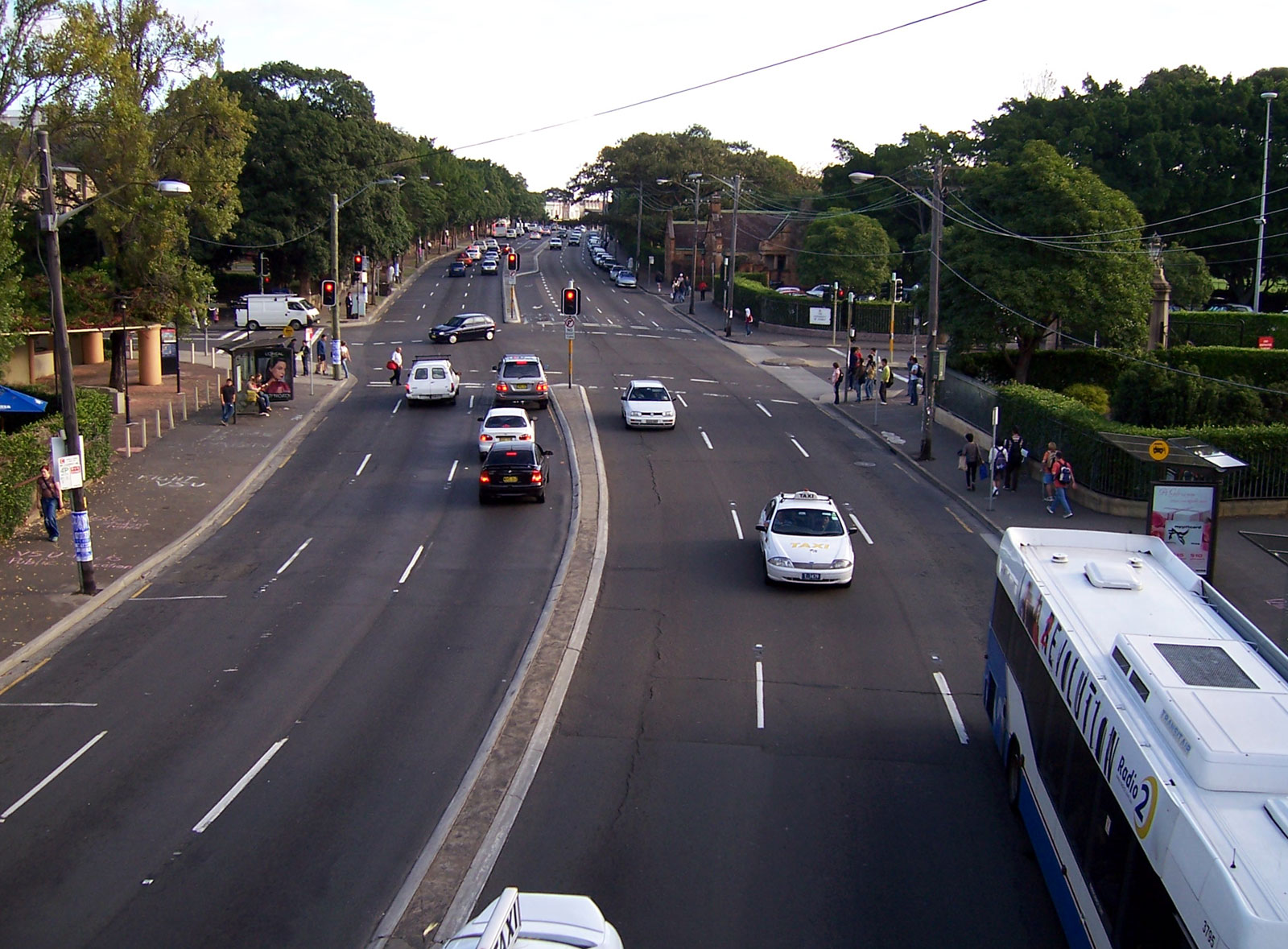
- City Road, as viewed from the bridge spanning the Darlington and Camperdown campuses of the University of Sydney

General information
- Type: Road
- Length: 1 km (0.6 mi)
- Maintained by: Transport for NSW
- Route number(s): A36 (2013–present)
- Former route number: State Route 54 (1993–2013); State Route 66 (1992–1993); National Route 1 (1955–1992)

Major junctions
- North end: Parramatta Road; Broadway; Glebe, Sydney
- Cleveland Street
- South end: King Street; Newtown, Sydney

Location(s)
- LGA(s): City of Sydney
- Major suburbs: Chippendale, Darlington

Highway system
- Highways in Australia; National Highway • Freeways in Australia; Highways in New South Wales

City Road is a busy 1-kilometre (0.62 mi) thoroughfare located in Sydney, New South Wales, Australia. City Road runs south from a junction with Broadway and Parramatta Road, through the University of Sydney and becomes King Street as it enters the suburb of Newtown.

City Road forms part of the Princes Highway officially and is allocated route A36. It is crossed by a 34-metre (112 ft) pedestrian footbridge opened in 2008, linking the two main campuses of the University of Sydney, and the footbridge was the subject of an international design competition won by John Wardle Architects.

== History and description ==
The road was originally the beginning of the main route leading from Sydney to Wollongong and points south, known as the Princes Highway. Although short, it still functions today as the main connection between the city centre and inner-western suburbs such as Newtown, Marrickville and Canterbury. Passing by Victoria Park and the leafy University of Sydney campus, the road is somewhat more picturesque than most metropolitan roads.

City Road was formerly served by a busy electric tram service until the late 1950s when it was replaced by motor bus services. Transdev John Holland routes 352 and 370 and Transit Systems 422, 423, 423X, 426, 428, 428X and 430 now run along City Road.
