= Live Hot Potatoes! =

2005 live album/video by The Wiggles

Live album by the Wiggles
- Released: 11 January 2005
- Venue: Sydney Entertainment Centre
- Genre: Children's music
- Labels: ABC (AUS); Koch Records (USA)
- Producer: Anthony Field

The Wiggles chronology
Santa's Rockin'! (2004)	Live Hot Potatoes! (2005)	Sailing Around the World (2005)

Live Hot Potatoes! is the first live concert album released by Australian children's music group, the Wiggles. It was released in 2005 in Australia by ABC Music, distributed by Roadshow Entertainment. It won the ARIA Music Award for Best Children's Album.

== Track list ==
1. Overture
2. Toot Toot, Chugga Chugga, Big Red Car
3. Introduction
4. Rock-a-Bye Your Bear
5. Let's Wake Jeff Up! (spoken)
6. Jeff's Favourite Instrument (spoken)
7. Let's Wake Jeff Up Again! (spoken)
8. Introduction
9. Lights, Camera, Action, Wiggles!
10. Introduction
11. Hoop-Dee-Doo
12. Introduction
13. D.O.R.O.T.H.Y. (My Favourite Dinosaur)
14. Introduction
15. Rolling Down the Sandhills/Running Up the Sandhills
16. Introduction
17. Can You (Point Your Fingers and Do the Twist?)
18. Introduction
19. Butterflies Flit
20. Network Wiggles News (spoken)
21. Where's Jeff?
22. Music With Murray (introduction)
23. Play Your Guitar with Murray
24. The Monkey Dance
25. Introduction
26. We're Dancing with Wags the Dog
27. Central Park New York
28. Introduction
29. Here Come The Reindeer
30. Introduction
31. Fruit Salad
32. Introduction
33. Captain Feathersword Fell Asleep on His Pirate Ship (Quack Quack)
34. Eagle Rock
35. Introduction
36. I Wave My Arms and Swing My Baton
37. Hot Potato
38. Christmas Medley
39. Farewell

== Video ==
Live Hot Potatoes!
- Directed by: Paul Field
- Written by: The Wiggles
- Starring: Greg Page; Anthony Field; Murray Cook; Jeff Fatt
- Distributed by: Roadshow/ABC Video (#102923)
- Release date: March 2005
- Running time: 1:19:52
- Country: Australia

Live Hot Potatoes! is the third live in concert video. It was filmed during their show on 20 December 2003 in Sydney on the Lights Camera Action Wiggles Tour and was released in 2005.

An earlier cut appeared on the American screener DVD release and was also released in 2005. It didn't have the opening title card, the closing credits, or the dedication cards, but it did have a full overture, as well as a complete earlier audio track that was later used as song clips in TV Series 4.

=== Cast ===
The Wiggles are:

- Murray Cook
- Jeff Fatt
- Anthony Field
- Greg Page

Also featuring

- Paul Paddick as Captain Feathersword
