= Singled Out (Eleanor McEvoy album) =

Compilation album by Eleanor McEvoy
- Released: 28 September 2009
- Genre: Rock, folk rock
- Label: Moscodisc
- Producer: Various

Eleanor McEvoy chronology
Love Must Be Tough (2008)	Singled Out (2009)	I'd Rather Go Blonde (2010)

Singled Out Eleanor McEvoy's is a 2009 compilation album of singles taken from McEvoy's four award-winning independently released albums. Three of the albums, Yola, Out There, and Love Must Be Tough, received the coveted Album of the Year Award from Hi-Fi+ Magazine. Early Hours was voted Best Contemporary Album 2004–2005 by Irish Music Magazine Readers Poll. The album includes Did I Hurt You and Isn't It A Little Late from McEvoy's double A-Side single which was the world's first single to be released on the on Super Audio Compact Disc SACD format. Singled Out is distinguished by McEvoy's unmistakable voice and her unique approach to themes of love, lust, and humor. It distinctly chronicles McEvoy's progression from a band format to a solo artist with a clear vision of her music.

Singled Out includes one new song, "Oh Uganda", which was written by McEvoy after she visited Northern Uganda as part of her support for the work of Oxfam Unwrapped. Oxfam Ireland describes McEvoy's visit to the Kitgum region of Uganda saying, "McEvoy returned to Ireland following a week-long trip to Uganda with Oxfam Ireland. The Dublin musician experienced firsthand the benefits of Oxfam Ireland Unwrapped, an initiative that sends meaningful presents like clean drinking water, schoolbooks, and vegetable gardens to developing countries throughout Africa". Oh Uganda includes harmony vocals from Ugandan singer Florence Mutesasira.

== Critical reception ==
In an era of homogeneous, packaged artists who find a niche and cling on for dear life, McEvoy is constantly changing, genre, style, and delivery. This album is sub-titled “The Independent Singles” but could just as easily be called “From Yola to Uganda” or “The Greatest Should Be Hits”. Over 15 vocal tracks plus a bonus DVD performance of one song you get a showcase of a major singer/songwriter and a collection of tracks that will amuse, delight, and often make you think.

== Track listings ==
All tracks are written by Eleanor McEvoy, except where noted.

No.	Title	Writer(s)	Length
1.	"Oh Uganda"		3:22
2.	"Isn't A Little Late?"		2:27
3.	"Did I Hurt You?"		3:33
4.	"I'll Be Willing"		3:10
5.	"Make Mine A SmallOne"	Eleanor McEvoy, Kieran McEvoy	3:27
6.	"Days Roll By"		3:26
7.	"You'll Hear Better Songs Than This"		3:31
8.	"Non Smoking Single Female"		3:19
9.	"Suffer So Well"		4:29
10.	"Mercy Mercy Me"	Marvin Gaye	3:26
11.	"Wrong So Wrong"		2:09
12.	"Love Must Be Tough"	Eleanor McEvoy, Johnny Rivers	3:59
13.	"Old New Borrowed and Blue"	Eleanor McEvoy, Dave Rotheray	3:33
14.	"Easy In Love"	Eleanor McEvoy, Brad Parker	3:47
15.	"Shame On the Moon"	Rodney Crowell	4:42
16.	"Wrong So Wrong" (BONUS VIDEO FEATURE)		2:11

== Single ==
- Oh Uganda
