= I'd Rather Go Blonde =

I’d Rather Go Blonde

Studio album by Eleanor McEvoy
- Released: 20 September 2010
- Genre: Rock / folk rock
- Label: Moscodisc
- Producer: Mick O'Gorman, Eleanor McEvoy, Peter Beckett

Eleanor McEvoy chronology
Singled Out (2009)	I’d Rather Go Blonde (2010)	Alone (2011)

I'd Rather Go Blonde is Irish singer-songwriter Eleanor McEvoy’s eighth studio album. The album features eleven tracks, nine of which were written by McEvoy, one was co-written with former Beautiful South member Dave Rotheray, and one is a cover of the song "Good Times" by Sam Cooke.

In the album, McEvoy discusses alienation, hypocrisy, recent Irish history, and romance.

I’d Rather Go Blonde was released as a CD, 12 track stereo hybrid SACD/CD, and on vinyl.

== Critical reception ==
A review in the September 2010 Maverick Magazine referred to the album as stunning, open, and honest.

=== Band members ===
- Ross Turner, born in Dublin, is a drummer with the award-winning Irish electronic rock band Jape. He has played with various bands including One Day International and Cathy Davey. He is currently recording under the name I Am The Cosmos.
- Gavin Fox was born in Dublin and is the bass player in Concerto for Constantine. He has also been in the band Vega4, Scottish rock band Idlewild, and Irish indie rock band Turn.
- Dubliner Peter Beckett is one of Ireland's leading arrangers. For 20 years he has worked in theatre as a musical director, while outside the theatre he has worked as a freelance musician playing keyboards and guitar. He co-produced and arranged Love Must Be Tough featuring his own The King Street Band, and co-produced and arranged Oh Uganda from the album Singled Out.
- Gerry O’Connor, aka Gerry ‘Banjo’ O’Connor, is a native of Co. Tipperary. He was described by The Wall Street Journal as “The best ever banjoist in the history of Irish music”. He has played with Chris Rea, Damien Dempsey and Sharon Shannon, among others. As well as having three solo albums to his name, he is a member of the popular Irish band Four Men and a Dog.
- Patrick Burke was a member of the Palestrina Choir for ten years under the direction of Ite O'Donovan. More recently, he was bass player for a number of years with Dublin band Jalopy. Sound engineering credits include The Gospel Project's album On the Outside, which featured a version of McEvoy's song Something So Wonderful.
- Ciarán Byrne became the house engineer at Windmill Lane studios in Dublin in 1988, working on Van Morrison and The Chieftains Celtic Heartbeat album, U2’s Rattle & Hum and Achtung Baby. He has also worked with other traditional Irish musicians, including Cooney and Begley, and Liam O’Flynn, and has worked with producers including Daniel Lanois, Pat McCarthy and Jimmy Iovine. I'd Rather Go Blonde is his fourth collaboration with McEvoy. He is currently co-owner of The Cauldron studios in Dublin
- Ruadhri Cushnan mixed Mumford & Sons debut album Sigh No More which went double platinum in the UK (staying more than 6 months in the top 10 UK album charts). Cushnan mixed KT Tunstall’s new album Tiger Suit. Cushnan started out as an engineer at Metropolis studios in London, working with Queen, Ray Charles, Robert Plant, Björk, Neneh Cherry, All Saints, Sugababes and also worked as George Michael’s producer for a number of years.

== Track listings ==
All tracks are written by Eleanor McEvoy, except where noted.

No.	Title	Writer(s)	Length
1.	"Look Like Me"		2:38
2.	"Just For The Tourists"	Eleanor McEvoy, Dave Rotheray	3:22
3.	"I'd Rather Go Blonde"		2:10
4.	"Away From You"		3:51
5.	"Deliver Me (From What You Do)"		3:49
6.	"Shibboleth"		3:01
7.	"Take You Home"		3:50
8.	"The Thought Of You"		3:39
9.	"Harbour"		3:17
10.	"For The Avoidance Of Any Doubt"		2:58
11.	"Good Times"	Sam Cooke	3:01
Total length:			35:36

SACD 12 track limited edition bonus track
No.	Title	Length
12.	"Little Look" (With Banana Boat, A Cappella)
