= Eleanor McEvoy (album) =

Studio album by Eleanor McEvoy
- Released: 1993
- Studio: Windmill Lane Studios
- Genres: Rock and roll, Folk rock
- Length: 52:02
- Label: Market Square Records
- Producer: Pat Moran

Eleanor McEvoy chronology
Eleanor McEvoy (1993)	What's Following Me? (1996)

Eleanor McEvoy is the 1993 studio album debut of Eleanor McEvoy, released on Geffen Records. International radio hits followed with the release of the two main singles "A Woman's Heart" and "Apologize." The former track had originally gained fame (in a different recording with Mary Black) as the title track for A Woman's Heart, the biggest-selling Irish album in Irish history.

McEvoy toured the United States, Europe and the Far East in support of the album and racked up international sales of over 250,000 copies. Hot Press, Ireland's premier music magazine, named her Best Solo Performer in 1992 and Best Songwriter in 1993 and placed the album amongst the top debuts of that year.

In June 2003, Eleanor McEvoy followed up the release of her award-winning fourth album, Yola, with the relaunch of her debut album. The remastered album appears under the title Eleanor McEvoy 'Special Edition' on Market Square Records (MSMCD127). In its new guise it is presented with an additional four tracks, two of which although from the same recording period, have never been released before. The album contains both English- and Spanish-language versions of "Only A Woman's Heart." However, the English-language version of "Only A Woman's Heart" on the remastered album is a different mix than that found on the original 1993 Geffen release.

== Critical reception ==
The album was praised in The New York Times with reviewer Jon Pareles writing, "Ms. McEvoy has the skills of a first-rate songwriter and she sings with a voice that is forthright and welcoming, from a breathy low register up to a clear mezzo-soprano."

== Track listings ==
All tracks are written by Eleanor McEvoy.

No.	Title	Length
1.	"Finding Myself Lost Again"	3:58
2.	"Only a Woman's Heart"	3:36
3.	"Apologise"	4:55
4.	"Boundaries of Your Mind"	4:28
5.	"For You"	4:40
6.	"Go Now"	2:44
7.	"It's Mine"	4:07
8.	"Not Quite Love"	4:33
9.	"Promises We Keep"	4:08
10.	"Music of It All"	4:24
11.	"Leave Her Now"	4:30
12.	"Breathing Hope"	3:16
13.	"Stray Thoughts"	2:42

Special Edition bonus tracks
No.	Title	Length
14.	"Et C'est Bien"	4:05
15.	"Wilderness"	3:47
16.	"Cat's Eyes"	4:48
17.	"Corazon de Mujer"	3:39

== Singles ==
- Apologise
- Only A Woman's Heart
- It's Mine

== Personnel ==
- Eleanor McEvoy: Vocals, acoustic and electric guitars, violin, piano, organ, harmonium
- Bill Shanley: Acoustic and electric guitars, dobro, harmonica, organ
- Jim Tate: Bass
- Noel Eccles: Drums, percussion, drum programming

=== Additional Personnel ===
- Declan Masterson: Bagpipes on tracks 8 and 13
- David James: Cello on tracks 5, 6 and 12
- String arrangements by Eleanor McEvoy
