= The Fables (band) =

Celtic rock band

- Origin: St. John's, Newfoundland and Labrador, Canada
- Genres: Rock; Folk rock; Celtic rock
- Years active: 1997–2010, 2015–present
- Members: Glenn Simmons; D'Arcy Broderick; Billy Sutton; Dave Fitzpatrick; Clyde Wiseman
- Past members: Ian Chipman; Byron Pardy; Mike McDonald; Glenn Hiscock
- Website: thefables.com

The Fables are a Celtic rock band formed in 1997 in St. John's, Newfoundland, by Glenn Simmons and D'Arcy Broderick. The original lineup of the band consisted of Simmons, Broderick, Billy Sutton, Dave Fitzpatrick, and Clyde Wiseman. In addition to extensive touring, the band released four studio albums from 1998 to 2007.

== History ==
The Fables was the brainchild of Glenn Simmons and fiddler D'Arcy Broderick, who wanted to form a Celtic rock group together. Simmons had previously performed with Wonderful Grand Band, and Broderick with The Irish Descendants. The other three members of the band include Billy Sutton, who was also from The Irish Descendents, Dave Fitzpatrick, and bassist Clyde Wiseman.

In 1998, the band released their first self-produced studio album, Tear the House Down. The album sold over 30,000 copies, although it had not received much promotion, and received critical praise, including East Coast Music Award (ECMA) nominations for Group Recording of the Year and Factor Recording of the Year. Simmons was awarded the Socan Song of the Year award for the title track "Tear the House Down". The band performed at the re-enactment in 2000 of the Viking landing a millennium earlier in L'Anse aux Meadows, Newfoundland, for a televised audience reported to have been 300 million viewers.

The band released their second studio album, A Time, in 2000. They received their first ECMA for Entertainer of the Year in 2001, along with their second set of ECMA nominations in the Group Recording and Factor Recording categories for A Time.

Their third studio album, St. John's, was greatly hampered when their label, Tidemark Records, went bankrupt shortly after its release in 2002. The Fables were left nearly $40,000 in debt due to the bankruptcy. At the 2002 New Years Eve celebrations at Niagara Falls, the band performed for a crowd of 30,000 people, with a broadcast audience of eight million throughout Canada and in the eastern United States. The band toured as much as possible over the next few years to retire their debts, including some concerts in 2006 for Canadian troops stationed in Kabul and Kandahar.

When the band reformed after a hiatus, Fitzpatrick and Wiseman did not return; only Simmons, Broderick and Sutton remained. The three recruited Ian Chipman, Byron Pardy, and Mike McDonald to fill out the group, and started work on a new album. As the recording was nearing completion, Broderick, tired of touring and unhappy with the direction the album had taken, quit the band. After replacing Broderick with Glenn Hiscock, the band went back into the studio to re-record vocals that were originally done with Broderick. The resulting fourth studio album, Kings and Little Ones, was released in the spring of 2007. The music was significantly different from what the band had previously released, deliberately encouraging creativity by featuring more original and fewer Celtic pieces. The band re-released St. John's in 2008. After two years of relentless touring, Simmons decided to end the group in 2010. He started performing again with the Wonderful Grand Band and subsequently began a solo career.

In 2015, the original lineup of the band reformed and played a number of summer tour dates, including the Newfoundland & Labrador Folk Festival. The band still plays the occasional show and has still been active as recently as February 8, 2020.

== Awards ==
- Socan Song of the Year for Tear the House Down (1999)
- ECMA Entertainer of the Year (2001)

== Discography ==
Studio Albums

- Tear the House Down (1998)
- A Time (2000)
- St. John's (2002)
- Kings and Little Ones (2007)

Music Videos

- "Down East Day" (2000)
