= What's Following Me? =

What's Following Me

Studio album by Eleanor McEvoy
- Released: August 13, 1996
- Genre: Rock / folk rock
- Length: 59:12
- Label: Columbia
- Producer: Eleanor McEvoy, Kevin Moloney

Eleanor McEvoy chronology
Eleanor McEvoy (1993)	What's Following Me (1996)	Snapshots (1999)

What's Following Me? is Eleanor McEvoy's second studio album and was released in 1996 for Columbia Records. The album is composed of thirteen songs composed by McEvoy. Topics such as alcoholism and Catholicism are explored in depth, but McEvoy's feelings of betrayal are most central to the message of the album.

== Critical reception ==
Steve Morse of the Boston Globe wrote: "Irish songstress Eleanor McEvoy just keeps getting better. Three years ago she surprised critics by outselling U2 in her homeland with the album, A Woman's Heart. Artistically, the new What's Following Me? is another step forward—a more seamless, more mature glimpse of romantic angst through the eyes of a survivor. McEvoy is an adroit melodist, but she's an even more adroit lyricist who has become a standout in the '90s singer-songwriter field. She can be touchingly vulnerable as in My Own Sweet Bed Tonight, where she sings, "Everyone has their battles and their pain hidden somewhere away." But she also rocks that pain away in The Weatherman and the erotic Biochemistry, where she urges, "Put your lips next to mine." But the show-stopper is Whisper a Prayer to the Moon, in which she tells a lover, "Please bear no grudge, just bare your soul." Good advice."

== Track listings ==
All tracks are written by Eleanor McEvoy, except where noted

No.	Title	Length
1.	"A Glass Unkissed"	5:05
2.	"Where Is the Healing?"	4:51
3.	"Don't Ask Me Why"	4:55
4.	"Precious Little"	4:25
5.	"Whisper a Prayer to the Moon"	3:20
6.	"Trapped Inside"	4:22
7.	"Sleepless"	5:18
8.	"My Own Sweet Bed Tonight"	4:54
9.	"Biochemistry"	4:48
10.	"The Weatherman (Twelve Days)"	4:13
11.	"The Fire Overhead"	6:22
12.	"All That Surrounds Me"	5:26
13.	"Famine"	4:48

== Singles ==
1. Whisper a Prayer to the Moon
2. Precious Little
3. Whisper a Prayer to the Moon
