= If You Leave =

If you leave may refer to:

- "If You Leave", episode of Degrassi: The Next Generation (season 6)
- If You Leave (Daughter album)
- If You Leave... (Eleanor McEvoy album) 2013
- "If You Leave" (song), by Orchestral Manoeuvres in the Dark
- "If You Leave", song by Train from Train (album)

== See also ==
- Si Te Vas (disambiguation)
