= Face to the Gale =

Studio album by Ron Hynes
- Released: 1997
- Recorded: 1995
- Length: 43:17
- Label: Artisan Music
- Producer: Chad Irschick

Ron Hynes chronology
| Cryer's Paradise (1993) | Face to the Gale (1997) | Standing in Line in the Rain (1998) |

Face to the Gale is the third studio album by Canadian folk singer-songwriter Ron Hynes, released by Artisan Music in 1997.

== Background ==
Face to the Gale was recorded in 1995, but Hynes' label, EMI Music Canada, decided not to release it until Hynes found someone to manage him. Then, in the spring of 1996, while he was working in Winnipeg with Graham Shaw, Hynes received a call from Rosalie Goldstein, the former artistic director of the Winnipeg Folk Festival, and he chose her as a manager. EMI Music Canada dropped Hynes from their roster a few months after the release of the album.

The album's lead single, "Godspeed", peaked at number 36 on Canada's RPM 100 Country Tracks chart in March 1997. The song was written as an elegy to Canadian singer-songwriter Gene MacLellan. Speaking to The Province in 1997, Hynes said of the song, "I was at a songwriting gathering shortly after he died [in 1995], and I spoke to the room for just a second. I said, 'Has everybody heard about Gene – Godspeed.' Having said that, I went upstairs, picked up a guitar and sang it. The song wrote itself in about 10 minutes. It was almost like he was right at my shoulder."

== Critical reception ==
Professional ratings
Review scores
| Source | Rating |
|---|---|
| AllMusic | 4.5/5 stars |

Upon its release, Lynn Saxberg of The Ottawa Citizen described Face to the Gale as being a "return to Hynes' folk roots" after the more "country market"-focused Cryer's Paradise. She considered the "eloquence" of Hynes' lyrics as "always [being] a highlight of his songwriting" and added that he "explores the timeless themes of folk balladry" across the album. She concluded that it "demonstrates Hynes' skill for writing tunes that sound as if they've always been with us". Roger Levesque of The Edmonton Journal praised Hynes' as a songwriter with "compelling maturity, a fine sense of imagery, moving stories and heartfelt performances", and noted the "refreshing lack of predictable love songs" on Face to the Gale. He continued, "It's populated by prisoners, immigrants, cabbies, sailors, race horses and most of all by the common man or woman experiencing that loss of place Hynes captures so well in a beautiful acoustic/electric setting."

Ted Hainworth of The StarPhoenix considered the album to be a "pleasing collection of stories about love, life and hard times and good times in Newfoundland" and added that the "strength of the work is the words". Aaron Badgley of AllMusic praised it as "a very strong, diverse, well-crafted album that would serve as a wonderful introduction to this talented Canadian artist". He noted the "central theme of loss" with "diverse lyrics" ranging from "Irish immigration to the loss of friends to murder". He added that Hynes' songwriting is "as good as ever", with the album's "newer material stand[ing] up to the best of his well-known songs". He picked "Godspeed" as the highlight, commending its "incredibly moving tune" and "beautiful, sad imagery".

== Track listing ==
All tracks are written by Ron Hynes except where noted.

| No. | Title | Writer(s) | Length |
|---|---|---|---|
| 1. | "Constance" | Ron Hynes, Connie Hynes | 4:14 |
| 2. | "Leaving on the Evening Tide" | | 3:46 |
| 3. | "Sonny's Dream" | | 3:50 |
| 4. | "Killer Cab" | | 3:46 |
| 5. | "Common Man" | | 3:32 |
| 6. | "Gone to Canada" | | 3:27 |
| 7. | "Godspeed" | | 2:47 |
| 8. | "St. John's Waltz" | | 3:29 |
| 9. | "The Final Breath" | | 3:23 |
| 10. | "Primitive Thunder" | | 3:32 |
| 11. | "Lighthouse" | Ron Hynes, Declan O'Doherty | 4:21 |
| 12. | "Away" | | 3:10 |

== Personnel ==
- Ron Hynes – lead vocals
- Michael Francis – acoustic guitar, electric guitar
- Ray Parker – electric piano, synthesizer
- Scott Alexander – acoustic bass, fretless bass
- Tom Szczesniak – bass
- Brian Leonard – drums, percussion
- David Blamires – backing vocals
- Neil Donell – backing vocals
- Pamela Morgan – backing vocals, whistle

Production

- Chad Irschick – production, engineering, mixing

Other

- Ivan Otis – photography
- Verve Graphic Design Consultants Inc. – design
