= Cryer's Paradise =

Studio album by Ron Hynes
- Released: 1993
- Length: 43:56
- Label: Atlantica Music
- Producer: Declan O'Doherty

Ron Hynes chronology
Discovery (1972)	Cryer's Paradise (1993)	Face to the Gale (1997)

Cryer's Paradise is the second studio album by Canadian folk singer-songwriter Ron Hynes, released by Atlantica Music in 1993.

== Background ==
As his first album for EMI Music Canada, Hynes recorded Cryer's Paradise with the country music market in mind, as he felt that country radio was the only place where his songs would get airplay.

"Atlantic Blue" was written as a tribute to the 84 men who died when the Ocean Ranger, a semi-submersible mobile offshore drilling unit, sank in Canadian waters on 15 February 1982.

== Singles ==
Six singles were released from Cryer's Paradise, five of which made appearances in Canada's RPM 100 Country Tracks chart:

- "Cryer's Paradise" (peaked at number 18 in September 1993)
- "Man of a Thousand Songs" (peaked at number 13 in January 1994)
- "No Kathleen" (peaked at number 10 in June 1994)
- "Atlantic Blue"
- "Roy Orbison Came On" (peaked at number 18 in January 1995)

== Critical reception ==
Professional ratings
Review scores
Source	Rating
AllMusic	3/5 stars

Upon its release, Susan Beyer of The Ottawa Citizen noted Hynes' "extraordinary lyrical gift", describing the songs on Cryer's Paradise as "short stories, full of the precisely right emotional accuracy of Alistair MacLeod and the heart and love of Rita MacNeil". Although she felt his vocals were sometimes "a tad too tentative" and some of the melodies "repetitious [and] even mundane", Beyer praised Hynes for being "original, centred, compassionate and accessible". Greg Burliuk of The Kingston Whig-Standard commented that it "showcase[s] an artist with a nice smoky voice and a deft touch with the lyrics, but whose music is sometimes predictable".

James O'Connor of The Winnipeg Sun described the album as a "quirky fusion of Newfoundland folk and Nashville fun" which results in an "engaging entry into the country race". He noted that although the "honest, homey tales breathe naivete", both "nimble picking" and "thoughtful production" work to "pull the [album] far enough off the Rock to be fairly presentable to the mainstream". In a retrospective review, Roch Parisien of AllMusic noted that Hynes "mixes traditional country with a healthy respect for the folk traditions of his native island" and added that the songs "are as brooding as the mist rising on the album sleeve, but convey intense pride and deep sense of roots".

== Track listing ==
All tracks are written by Ron Hynes except where noted.

No.	Title	Writer(s)	Length
1.	"Cryer's Paradise"		3:51
2.	"Man of a Thousand Songs"		3:18
3.	"No Kathleen"	Ron Hynes, Connie Hynes	3:30
4.	"If I Left You Alone with My Heart"		3:25
5.	"Story of My Life"		4:05
6.	"Maybe She Went Crazy"	Ron Hynes, Connie Hynes	3:54
7.	"River of No Return"	Ron Hynes, Terry Kelly	3:40
8.	"False Hearted Love"		3:17
9.	"Where Do You Get Off"		4:05
10.	"Picture to Hollywood"	Ron Hynes, Connie Hynes	3:24
11.	"Roy Orbison Came On"		3:58
12.	"Atlantic Blue"		3:29

== Personnel ==
- Ron Hynes – lead vocals (all tracks), backing vocals (3, 5, 10), guitar (5–7, 10–12)
- Glenn Simmons – guitar (1–5, 7, 8, 10, 11)
- Sandy Morris – guitar (1–3, 8), dobro (5), national slide (7), Rickenbacker 12-string (11)
- Michael Francis – guitar (1, 2, 4–6, 9–11), mandolin (3, 6, 9)
- Tom Szczesniak – accordion (1, 3), bass (2, 3, 10)
- Steve Smith – pedal steel (2, 4, 5, 8, 10)
- Don Reed – fiddle (2, 4–6, 8)
- Ray Parker – keyboards (2, 8, 10, 11)
- Declan O'Doherty – keyboards (3, 6, 11), piano (7, 9)
- Graham Shaw – keyboards (11), backing vocals (11)
- Guido Basso – chromatic harmonica (11)
- Peter Cardinali – bass (1, 4–9, 11)
- Claude Desjardins – drums (1)
- Kevan McKenzie – drums (2–9, 11)
- Brian Leonard – percussion (6, 10), drums (10)
- The Hynes Brothers – backing vocals (1, 7)
- Neil Donell – backing vocals (2, 4, 8)
- Colina Phillips – backing vocals (6, 11)
- Pamela Morgan – backing vocals (9, 10)

Production

- Declan O'Doherty – producer
- Chad Irschick – recording, mixing
- Mike Roper – recording
- Bob Ludwig – mastering

Other

- Connie Hynes – photography
- Cynthia Henry – art direction, design
