= Milord (song) =

Single by Édith Piaf

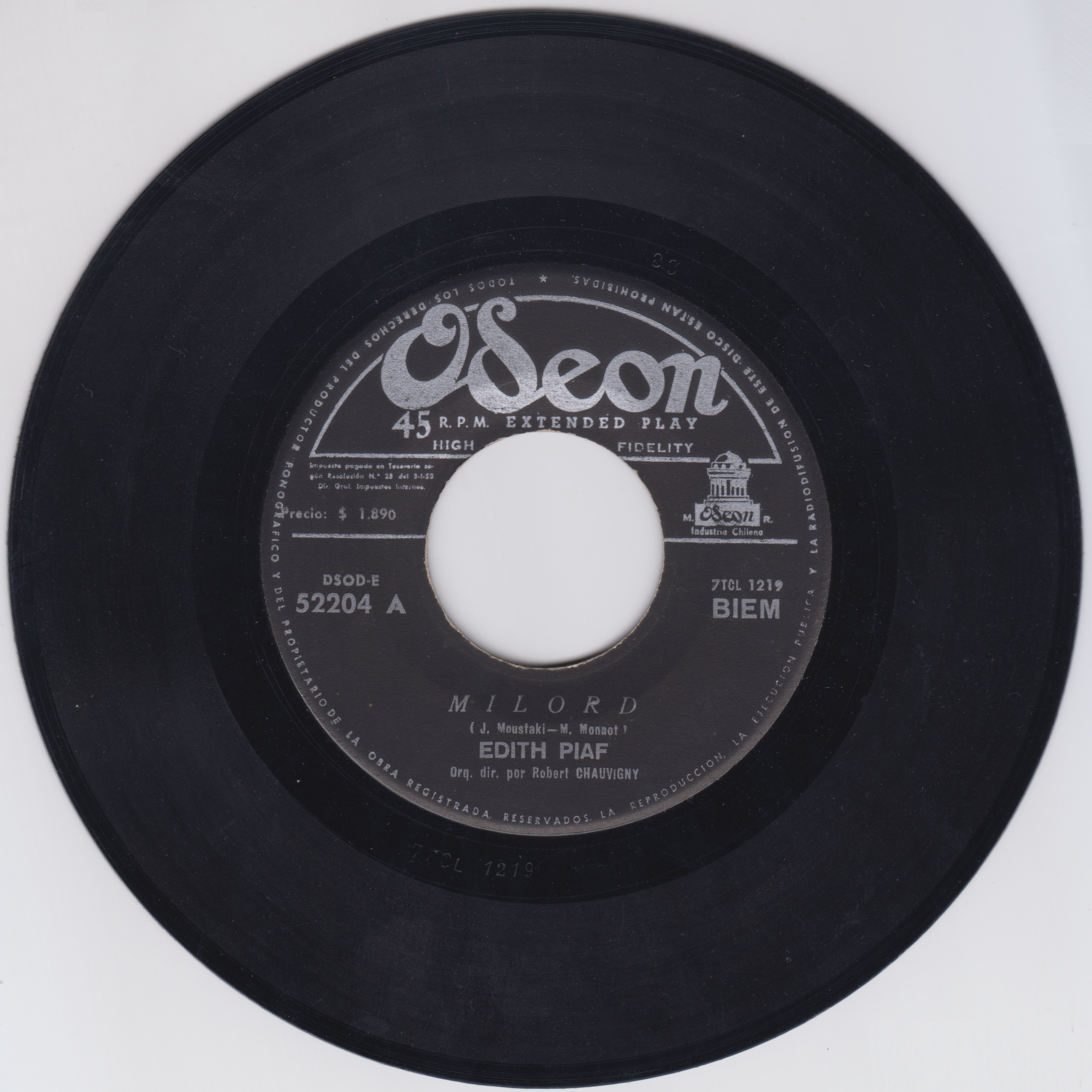
- Chilean EP of "Milord", released by the Odeon label.

Song
- Language: French
- Genre: chanson
- Composer: Marguerite Monnot
- Lyricist: Georges Moustaki

"Milord" (French pronunciation: [milɔʁ]) or "Ombre de la Rue" [ɔ̃bʁə də la ʁy] ("Shadow of the Street") is a 1959 song (lyrics by Georges Moustaki, music by Marguerite Monnot), famously sung by Édith Piaf.

== Background ==
It is a chanson that recounts the feelings of a lower-class "girl of the port" (fille du port, perhaps a prostitute) who develops a crush on an elegantly attired apparent upper-class British traveller (or "milord"), whom she has seen walking the streets of the town several times (with a beautiful young woman on his arm), but who has not even noticed her. The singer feels that she is nothing more than a "shadow of the street" (ombre de la rue). Nonetheless, when she talks to him of love, she breaks through his shell; he begins to cry, and she has the job of cheering him up again. She succeeds, and the song ends with her shouting "Bravo! Milord" and "Encore, Milord".

In connection with the film about Edith Piaf, La Vie en Rose (2007), Moustaki talked in an interview with Le Nouvel Observateur (14 February 2007) about "Milord":

"It was a song I had left in draft form until one day I found the scribbled sheet next to the typewriter Piaf had given me. I resumed to work with it. When I had written the last word I found Edith sitting on a chair behind the bedroom door. She was waiting for me to finish the text (Marguerite Monnot was to compose the music). I was barely 24 years old and, for a year that I had been living with Piaf, I had the image of an upstart gigolo. Edith summoned all the press to Maxim's to introduce me as the author of "Milord". When, at the start of the film, she says: "I'm going to record the big con's song", and she sings "Milord", it's vexing but probable. After I left, she said horrible things about me. She even almost didn't want to record "Milord", even though she was aware of its importance. It is the only song in her repertoire that became an international hit. Her impresario Loulou Barrier threatened to stop working with her if she was stupid enough not to record it".

Thus she recorded "Milord" at Capitol Studios, 151W 46th Street, New York on May 8, 1959.

== Chart performance ==
In France "Milord" sold more than 400,000 copies. The song was a #1-hit in Germany in July 1960. In the UK it reached #16 (1960), in Sweden #1 during 8 weeks (15/6-1/8 1960), in Norway #6 (1959). In the United States, the song peaked at #88 on the Billboard Hot 100 in March 1961. By 1969, Milord has sold 25,000 copies in Austria.

== Cover versions ==
- "Milord" was one of Germany's biggest selling songs of 1960. Aside from Edith Piaf's original French version, there have also been German cover versions by Dalida, Lale Andersen, and Corry Brokken. Brokken also recorded the song in Dutch. An English version was recorded by Lolita.
- Teresa Brewer recorded an English version of the song which reached #74 on the Billboard Hot 100 chart in 1961.
- Italian versions were recorded by Dalida, Milva and Isabella Fedeli.
- Swedish versions were cut by Anita Lindblom (Karusell KSEP 3213), Marie Ade (Knäppupp KNEP 117) and Bibi Nyström (Telefunken U 5414).
- This song was also covered by male crooner, Bobby Darin in 1964, with slightly altered French lyrics, to account for the fact that Darin was a man (the original lyrics were written to be sung by a woman, in particular Edith Piaf; the title remained the same however). The song reached #14 on the Canadian RPM charts and #25 on the CHUM Charts.
- Hana Hegerová recorded Czech version of "Milord" in 1964, with lyric of Pavel Kopta.
- A reworded English cover was recorded by Frankie Vaughan in which he explains to a man he refers to as Milord that the woman he loves is with someone else and he should forget her, relax, be happy and find another woman.
- Benny Hill produced a skit modeled on the musical Cabaret, and included the song "Milord," sung — in English — by Louise English, a member of Hill's Angels. It is the closing number in the skit and the refrain is repeated as the patrons toast each other and throw confetti.
- Cher sang an English version of "Milord" on her second solo album The Sonny Side of Cher which was released in 1966.
- It has also been sung by Liza Minnelli in 1966
- The all-girl punk group the Mo-dettes in 1980
- Turkish singer Candan Erçetin in 2003.
- Harpers Bizarre recorded "Milord" for their 1967 album "Anything Goes."
- A synth-pop version was recorded by the Hungarian band Napoleon Boulevard, and released as a single in 1988.
- In-grid sang a remix of "Milord" in her album La Vie en Rose released in 2004. The song was edited to have a faster speed than the original.
- Herb Alpert recorded an instrumental version on the album Herb Alpert's Tijuana Brass, Volume 2 (1963).
- French jazz, soul singer Raquel Bitton performed the song as part of her Piaf tribute show "Piaf: Her Story, Her Songs".
- Paris Saint-Germain supporters from the Auteuil stand of the Parc des Princes have a chant based on "Milord".
- A German Schlager version titled "Das rote Pferd (The Red Horse)" was performed by Markus Becker und die Mallorca Cowboys.
- Czech singer Marta Balejová recorded in 2000 other Czech version "Štramák".
- Světlana Nálepková recorded other version of this song "Milord" in 2003 with lyrics of Jiří Dědeček.
- English rock band the Struts released a cover in 2013.
- Irish singer-songwriter Eleanor McEvoy regularly covers the song in her live shows, releasing it in her 2014 album, STUFF
- Prljavi inspektor Blaža i Kljunovi covered song as a football chant for the World Cup in 1998. and 2018, under the name "Allez Yu" and "Allez Srbija" respectively.
