= Standing in Line in the Rain =

Studio album by Ron Hynes
- Released: 1998
- Length: 41:27
- Label: Independent
- Producer: Sandy Morris; Ron Hynes

Ron Hynes chronology
| Face to the Gale (1997) | Standing in Line in the Rain (1998) | The Sandcastle Sessions (2001) |

Standing in Line in the Rain is the fourth studio album by Canadian folk singer-songwriter Ron Hynes, released independently in 1998.

== Background ==
In 1997, a few months after the release of Face to the Gale, EMI Music Canada dropped Hynes from their roster, leaving him without a record label. Undeterred by the loss of a major record label, Hynes produced a new album, Standing in Line in the Rain, which he released independently in 1998. Containing a mixture of tracks recorded live and in the studio, those recorded live were performed at the LSPU Hall, St. John's, Newfoundland and Labrador, in May 1998, and those in the studio were recorded at Nickel Soundworks.

Speaking of the album, Hynes told The Edmonton Journal in 1999, "It's almost all brand new material and it's a very rootsby sounding recording with lots of dobro and accordion. There are a couple of tunes that go for it, using a lot of electric slide guitar that were recorded as singles for the AM radio stations, but even those are true to what I've done on stage in the past."

The album won "best new album" at the 1998 Media Innovation Awards (MIA) Awards.

== Release ==
Hynes initially produced 1,000 copies of the album. Many were sold at his concerts and by February 1999, the album was into its third pressing (1,00 at a time) and had reached sales of around 2,500 copies in total. The copies that were sold elsewhere, away from the stage, were distributed by the company, Tidemark. The album's front cover artwork was painted by Hynes' wife, Connie, and the name of the painting was also used as the title of the album. It was inspired by Bob Dylan's 1986 song "Brownsville Girl" which contains the line "I'm standin' in line in the rain to see a movie starring Gregory Peck".

The album received a CD reissue in 2014 as a remastered and limited "collector's edition" with a new sleeve design featuring a painting by Adam Young. It was exclusively available to order on Hynes' website, with each copy being hand-numbered and personally autographed.

== Critical reception ==
Professional ratings
Review scores
| Source | Rating |
|---|---|
| AllMusic | 4/5 stars |

Aaron Badgley of AllMusic praised Hynes as a "gifted and talented singer/songwriter" who presents another album of his "own brand of Maritime folk music". He considered the music to be "instantly likable" and noted that some of the lyrics tackled "unique topics", such as on the opening track, "Picture of Dorian Gray". He also praised Hynes' voice for being "as strong as ever" and his band for being "tight" and "play[ing] beautifully". Badgley concluded, "This is an excellent example of East Coast folk music for all to enjoy. Although this album is not as strong as Face to the Gale, fans will still love it."

== Track listing ==
All tracks are written by Ron Hynes except where noted

| No. | Title | Writer(s) | Length |
|---|---|---|---|
| 1. | "Picture of Dorian Grey" | | 3:23 |
| 2. | "Shine Like Diamonds" | Ron Hynes, Connie Hynes | 4:12 |
| 3. | "She Never Will" | | 4:07 |
| 4. | "You Drove Me There" | Ron Hynes, Connie Hynes | 2:58 |
| 5. | "Do You" | Ron Hynes, Connie Hynes, Jamie Snider | 3:13 |
| 6. | "Last Chance Avenue" | | 3:46 |
| 7. | "Constant in the Heart" | | 3:44 |
| 8. | "Lonely Song" | Ron Hynes, Declan O'Doherty | 2:59 |
| 9. | "Name Without a Face" | | 3:11 |
| 10. | "Native Side" | Ron Hynes, Connie Hynes | 3:21 |
| 11. | "Pilot" | | 3:09 |
| 12. | "Saviour" | | 3:24 |

== Personnel ==
- Ron Hynes – lead vocals, guitars
- Glenn Simmons – guitars, backing vocals
- Cory Tetford – guitars, backing vocals
- Sandy Morris – guitars, Bottleneck, dobro
- Paul Kinsman – Hammond organ, dobro, accordion
- Byron Pardy – bass
- Paul (Boomer) Stamp – drums

Production

- Sandy Morris – production
- Ron Hynes – production
- Chad Irschick – mixing
- Brian Power – concert recorder
- Pat Janes – concert recorder
- Murray Riggs – live concert sound
- Cory Tetford – recorder (studio)
