= Dolores Keane =

Irish folk singer (1953–2026)

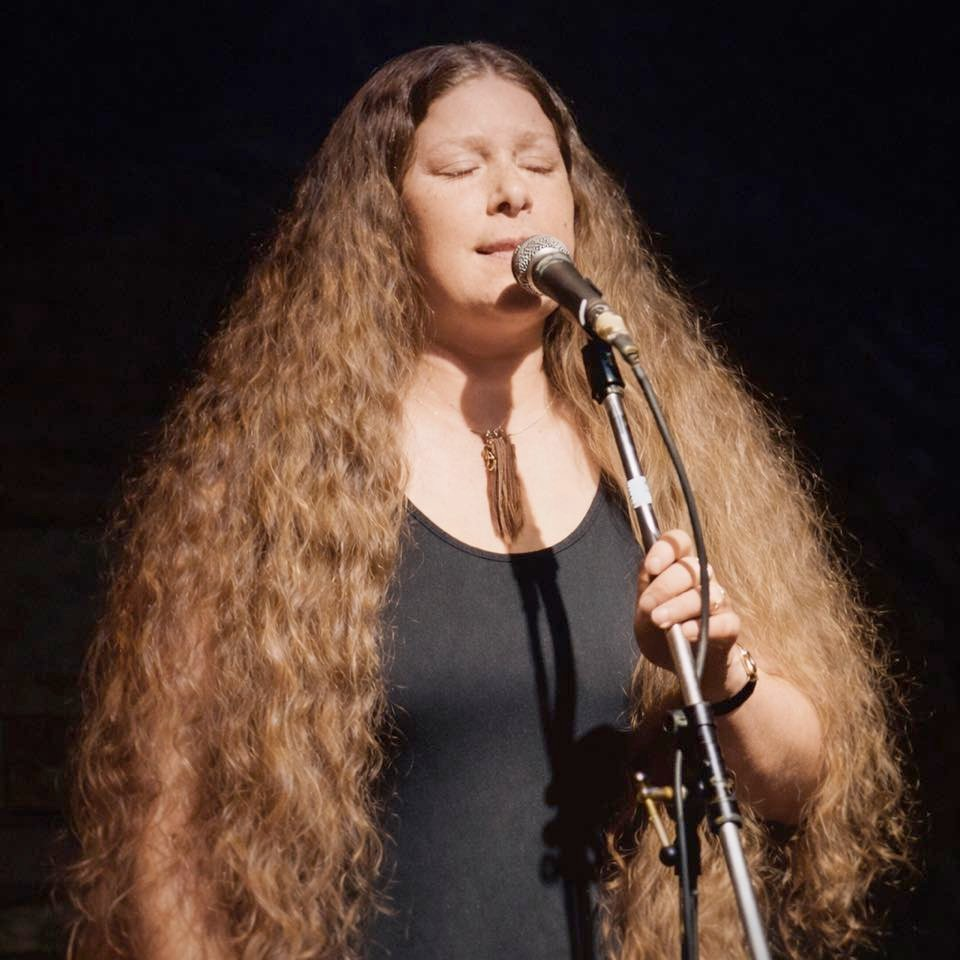
- Keane in 1985

Background information
- Born: 26 September 1953; Sylane, County Galway, Ireland
- Died: 16 March 2026 (aged 72) Caherlistrane, County Galway, Ireland
- Genres: Celtic; folk
- Occupation: Singer
- Years active: 1975–2026
- Formerly of: De Dannan

Dolores Keane (26 September 1953 – 16 March 2026) was an Irish folk singer. She was a founding member of the group De Dannan and later pursued a solo recording and touring career.

== Background ==
Keane was born on 26 September 1953 in Sylane, a small town near Caherlistrane, County Galway, in the west of Ireland, the third of eight children. Her father Matthew Keane and her mother Bridie (née Comer) were both singers who in the early years of their marriage had lived in Dublin. From the age of four, she was raised by her aunts Rita and Sarah Keane, who were well-known sean-nós singers and held weekend music sessions in their house. Her uncle Paddy taught her to play whistle and flute. Keane started her singing at a very young age, influenced by her musical aunts. A presenter for RTE heard Dolores singing at one of the sessions and she made her first recording for Radio Éireann in 1958 at the age of five. By the age of six, she was winning medals at Feis Ceoil, a music competition held every year in Dublin. Her brother Seán also had a successful musical career. Keane attended a convent secondary school in Tuam.

== Musical career ==
=== Dé Danann ===
In 1974, Keane co-founded the traditional Irish band Dé Danann and the group released their debut album, Dé Danann, in the same year. Dé Danann gained international recognition, and enjoyed major success in the late 1970s in the United States. Keane toured with the band, and their single "The Rambling Irishman" was a big hit in Ireland. In early 1976, Keane left Dé Danann and was replaced by Andy Irvine, who recorded live with the band on 30 April 1976 during the Third Irish Folk Festival in Germany. In 1977, she married multi-instrumentalist John Faulkner, with whom she recorded three albums of folk music.

=== Solo career ===
Keane lived and worked in London for several years with Faulkner. They moved to Ireland in the early 1980s. Keane and Faulkner worked on a series of film scores and programmes for the BBC and formed two successful bands, The Reel Union and Kinvara. During this period Keane recorded her first solo album, There Was a Maid, in 1978. This was followed by two more releases, Broken Hearted I'll Wander (1979) and Farewell to Eirinn (1980), which gave credit to Faulkner. In the mid-1980s, Keane rejoined De Dannan and they recorded the albums Anthem and Ballroom.

In 1988, Keane returned to her solo career and released the album Dolores Keane. Her follow-up album, A Lion in a Cage, was released in 1989, It featured a song written by Faulkner called "Lion in a Cage" which protested at the imprisonment of Nelson Mandela. This became Keane's first Irish number-one single and she performed the song at the celebration of Mandela's release. In 1990-91, Keane played the female lead in the Dublin production of Brendan Behan's The Hostage, a new translation by Niall Tóibín and Michael Scott. The opening night was attended by Mary Robinson, the President of Ireland.

In 1992, Keane was one of many female Irish singers whose music was included in the record-breaking anthology A Woman's Heart. The album also featured Eleanor McEvoy, Mary Black, Frances Black, Sharon Shannon and Maura O'Connell and became the biggest-selling album in Ireland's history. A Woman's Heart Vol. 2 was released in late 1994 and was a high charting album in Ireland. Also in 1994, a solo album entitled Solid Ground was released on the Shanachie label (available on Dara Records) and received critical acclaim in Europe and America.

In August 1995, Keane was awarded the prestigious Fiddler's Green Hall of Fame award in Rostrevor, County Down, for her "significant contribution to the cause of Irish music and culture". In the same year, she performed in the Dublin production of JM Synge's Playboy of the Western World. She contributed to the RTÉ/BBC television production Bringing It All Back Home (1991), a series of programmes illustrating the migration of Irish music to America. Keane was shown performing in Nashville, Tennessee, with musicians such as Emmylou Harris and Richard Thompson, and at home in Galway with her aunts Rita and Sarah.

In August 1997, Keane went to number one again in the Irish albums chart with a compilation album of her most loved songs. Another studio album, Night Owl, was released in 1998, on which she returned to her traditional Irish roots. Night Owl did well in Europe and America. With a healthy solo career, Keane went on tour with De Dannan again in the late 1990s and played to packed audiences in venues such as Birmingham, Alabama, and New York City.

== Musical legacy ==
Keane was known for her deep, melodic voice. Her recordings of songs such as Dougie MacLean's "Caledonia", Frank A. Fahey's "Galway Bay", Paul Brady's "The Island", and Donagh Long's "Never Be the Sun" are considered to be among the greatest interpretations of these songs. American singer Nanci Griffith said of Keane: "Dolores Keane, the queen of the soul of Ireland, has a sacred voice". On 17 April 2022, Keane was presented with a Lifetime Achievement Award at the TG4 Gradam Ceoil awards ceremony for Irish traditional music at the National Concert Hall in Dublin. In November 2024, she received an honorary doctorate in Music from University of Galway (DMus).

In October 2026, seven months after her death, it was announced that Keane would be inducted into the RTÉ Radio 1 Folk Awards Hall of Fame.

== Personal life and death ==
Keane married musician John Faulkner in 1977. After a difficult pregnancy, she gave birth to their first child, a son, who was born with Bardet–Biedl syndrome. Their marriage ended in 1988. Keane had a long relationship with Barry "Bazza" Farmer, with whom she had her second child, a daughter, in 1994. Keane ended her recording and touring in the late 1990s because of depression and alcoholism. She received extensive treatment for these conditions. In June 2014, she was told that she was cancer-free after having earlier developed the illness.

Keane died at her home at Caherlistrane, Ireland, on 16 March 2026 at the age of 72.

== Discography ==
- There Was a Maid (1978)
- Dolores Keane (1988)
- Lion in a Cage (1989)
- Solid Ground (1993)
- Night Owl (1998) Alula Records

=== Dé Danann ===
- Dé Danann (1975)
- Anthem (1985)
- Ballroom (1988)

=== Dolores Keane and John Faulkner ===
- Broken Hearted I'll Wander (1979)
- Farewell to Éirinn (1980)
- Sail Óg Rua (1983)

=== Rita Eriksen and Dolores Keane ===
- Tideland (1996) Alula Records

=== Compilations ===
- Best of Dolores Keane (1997)
- Where Have All the Flowers Gone: The Very Best of Dolores Keane (2003)
- Anthology: Celebrating Seventy Years (2023)

=== John Prine and others ===
- In Spite of Ourselves (1999) Oh Boy Records

Dolores duets with John on "It's a Cheating Situation" and "In a Town This Size".

=== Anthologies ===
- A Woman's Heart (1992)
- A Woman's Heart 2 (1994)
- Bringing It All Back Home – Influence of Irish Music (2 CDs) (2000)

=== Video (VHS) ===
- Bringing It All Back Home – Influence of Irish Music (1992) (various artists)
