= Eleanor McEvoy =

Irish singer-songwriter (born 1967)

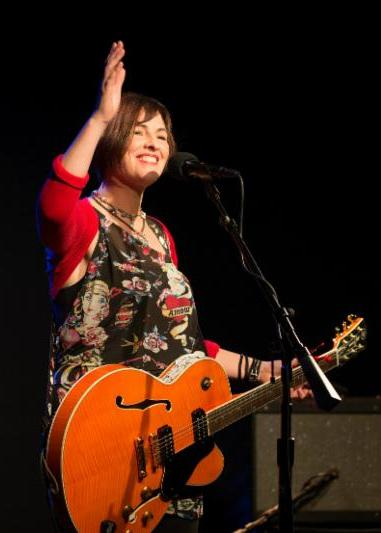
- McEvoy performing in 2016

Background information
- Born: 22 January 1967 (age 59)
- Origin: Dublin, Ireland
- Genres: Rock; folk
- Years active: 1990–present
- Labels: Geffen; Columbia; Market Square; Moscodisc; Blue Dandelion Records
- Website: eleanormcevoy.net

Eleanor McEvoy (born 22 January 1967) is an Irish singer-songwriter. She composed the song "Only a Woman's Heart", title track of A Woman's Heart, the best-selling Irish album in Irish history.

== Early life and beginnings ==
McEvoy's life as a musician began at the age of four when she began playing piano. At the age of eight she took up violin. Upon finishing school she attended Trinity College Dublin where she studied music by day and worked in pit orchestras and music clubs by night. McEvoy graduated from Trinity with an Honors Degree in music in 1988, and spent four months busking in New York City. In 1988, she was accepted into the RTÉ National Symphony Orchestra where she spent four years before leaving to concentrate on songwriting.

== Career ==
=== 1992–2000 ===
McEvoy built up a following in clubs in Dublin with her three-piece band, Jim Tate on bass, Noel Eccles on drums, and latterly Bill Shanley on guitar. During a solo date in July 1992, she performed a little-known, self-penned song, "Only a Woman's Heart". Mary Black, of whose band McEvoy was a member, was in the audience and invited her to add the track to an album of Irish female artists. The album was subsequently titled A Woman's Heart and the track was released as the lead single.

A few days before A Woman's Heart was released, Tom Zutaut, A&R from Geffen Records, who had previously signed Guns N' Roses, Mötley Crüe, and Edie Brickell, offered McEvoy a worldwide recording deal after watching her perform at The Baggot Inn in Dublin.

The album went on to sell over three-quarters of a million copies in Ireland alone and was (and remains) the biggest-selling Irish album of all time.

Eleanor McEvoy, her first album, recorded in Windmill Lane Studios, was released in February 1993, and tours in the United States, Asia, and Europe followed. Back on Irish soil, McEvoy was awarded Best New Artist, Best New Performer, and Best Songwriter Awards by the Irish entertainment and music industries.

As she began writing her second album, Tom Zutaut left Geffen Records, and McEvoy was offered and accepted a new deal with Columbia Records US. The new album, What's Following Me?, was released in 1996. The single "Precious Little" became a top-10 radio hit in the United States, giving McEvoy the exposure she needed for a headline tour of the US. She was invited to contribute to a number of movie and TV soundtracks.

McEvoy released her third album, Snapshots, in 1999. Her primary goal was to make Snapshots her most song-oriented album to date. Toward that goal, McEvoy teamed up with producer Rupert Hine and recorded the album at Rupert's "Chateau de la Tour de Moulin" and then in Metropolis Studios in London. The extensive use of drum loops was a complete change in style from her previous work.

The album was greeted by rave reviews on both sides of the Atlantic. "... her sophisticated voice and compassionate seasoned lyrics ... make Eleanor McEvoy's album a gem...." declared The Boston Globe, while The Sunday Times described it as "her strongest album to date, with well-appointed social comment topics...McEvoy's take on matters emotional also hits pay dirt with the likes of the excellent 'Did You Tell Him?'" However, Columbia Records had been unprepared for the complete stylistic change and relations between the company and McEvoy became strained. Despite this, a sell-out, 24-date tour of the United States accompanied the release of Snapshots in the summer of 1999, followed by the "Snapshots Unplugged" tour March–April 2000, which culminated in a performance in Boulder, Colorado accompanied by the E Town Band where she duetted with Richard Thompson.

Columbia Records had bought her first album Eleanor McEvoy from Geffen Records, but had not released it by 2000. Neither What's Following Me? nor Snapshots had enjoyed major chart success, and McEvoy's public perception, particularly in Ireland, was caught in a limbo state between rock and folk, with "A Woman's Heart" and its many incarnations still lurking in the back of the minds of the record-buying public.

Increasingly, McEvoy started to work on outside projects. The Bert Jansch tribute album People on the Highway – A Bert Jansch Encomium (2000) saw a newly recorded version of Jansch's song about Sandy Denny, "Where Did My Life Go?", recorded by McEvoy especially for the album. Participating artists included Al Stewart, Roy Harper, Bernard Butler, Donovan, and Ralph McTell.

=== 2001–2005 ===
McEvoy decided to take her fourth album and head down the independent road. Yola was a turning point in McEvoy's musical direction. Released in 2001, it reflected the acoustic, jazz-influenced style she had developed on stage with Brian Connor. For McEvoy it was a new departure and one that found favour with music media. Irish Music Press described it as .... "her finest album", "a brave rejection of the predictable", "musically daring....beautifully atmospheric". International press lauded it as "a back to basics triumph", "beautifully restrained", "a classic", and "McEvoy's best release to date". Extensive touring throughout the US and the UK followed. In 2002, Yola was named "Record of the Year" by Hi-Fi+ Magazine.

March 2004 saw the release of Early Hours, produced by McEvoy and Brian Connor. The album featured McEvoy on vocals, guitar, and fiddle; Connor on piano, Fender Rhodes, Wurlitzer, Hammond organ, and keyboards; Liam Bradley on kit percussion and backing vocals; Calum McColl on guitars and backing vocals; Nicky Scott on bass; and Lindley Hamilton on trumpets. The style differed from McEvoy's previous work, taking on a jazz/blues feel for many of the songs. Early Hours continued the high-quality audio work that had been established with Yola. This album was the first to use TiMax (unique audio imaging) technology, mixed in 5.1 surround-sound onto multi-channel Super Audio CD (SACD). Early Hours was voted Best Contemporary Album 2004–2005, by Irish Music Magazine Readers Poll.

McEvoy continued to tour with Brian Connor until April 2005. She then began performing solo, accompanying herself on bass guitar, electric guitar, mandolin and violin.

=== 2007–2010 ===
McEvoy's sixth album, Out There, was recorded in The Grange Studio in Norfolk and released in early 2007. It was self-penned, self-produced and featured McEvoy performing all of the instruments with the exception of a guitar part on "Quote I Love You Unquote" played by Dave Rotheray (formerly of Beautiful South) and the drumming of Liam Bradley (Van Morrison, Ronan Keating) on three tracks. On track 5, Vigeland's Dream, McEvoy eloquently describes a walk she once took in Vigeland Sculpture Park which is a part of Frogner Park (Frognerparken), a public park located in the borough of Frogner, in Oslo, Norway. McEvoy toured the album extensively in Britain, Ireland, Spain and Australia throughout 2007 and early 2008. In 2007, Out There brought McEvoy her second "Record of the Year" award from Hi-Fi+ Magazine.

Love Must Be Tough (MOSCD404, released 2008), her seventh album, is a departure from previous albums, where all the songs were typically her own. Half of the album features covers of songs originally written and performed by men about women.

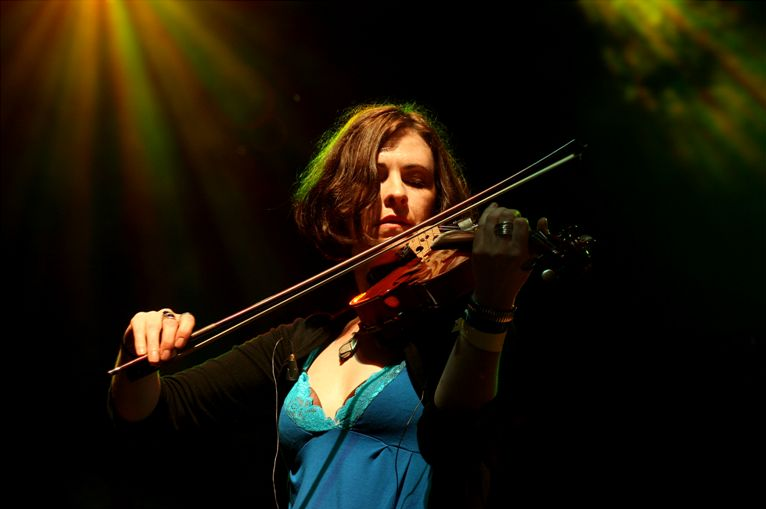
McEvoy performing in 2008

The lead single, "Old, New, Borrowed and Blue", written by McEvoy and long-time friend Dave Rotheray (Beautiful South/Homespun), is a twist on the jaundiced over-optimism of the standard wedding song. Another track by the duo, "The Night May Still Be Young, But I Am Not", is also on the album. In 2008, McEvoy received her third "Record of the Year" award from Hi-Fi+ Magazine.

In 2007, McEvoy was awarded "Best Traditional Act" at the 7th annual Big Buzz Awards, which are voted for entirely by the general public.

In 2008, McEvoy toured from January to November in the UK, Australia, Spain, Germany, Poland and Ireland, with additional one-off dates in the Far East and elsewhere in Europe, including an appearance at Glastonbury in June 2008.

On 21 November 2008, "Easy in Love" from the album Love Must Be Tough was released as a single to highlight McEvoy's visit to Uganda on behalf of Oxfam Ireland.

McEvoy's album Singled Out was released on 28 September 2008. The album is a compilation of singles taken from McEvoy's four award-winning, independently released albums. Three of the albums, Yola, Out There, and Love Must Be Tough, received the Album of the Year Award from Hi-Fi+ Magazine. Early Hours was voted Best Contemporary Album 2004–2005 by Irish Music Magazine Readers Poll. The album includes "Did I Hurt You" and "Isn't It a Little Late" from McEvoy's double A-side single, the world's first single to be released on SACD format. Singled Out includes one new song, "Oh Uganda", which was written by McEvoy after her visit to Northern Uganda as part of her support for the work of Oxfam Unwrapped.

I'd Rather Go Blonde, released 20 September 2010, is McEvoy's eighth album, and was met with good reviews including the five-star review in 2010 Maverick Magazine: "This absolutely stunning album, has been a real find – one of the most compelling female singer-songwriters I've heard in a long time."

=== 2011–2014 ===
Alone, McEvoy's ninth album, released on 12 September 2011, is a collection of twelve stripped-down solo numbers. Says McEvoy, ""There was a time when I was stranded in a long gap between tour dates and, with time to kill, I headed for the peace of The Grange; a small studio tucked away in the Norfolk countryside." The product of those tranquil sessions is an album of incredibly haunting performances, up close, personal, and timeless. This is McEvoy in her most intimate setting, running through the journey of her writing and singing career.

If You Leave... McEvoy's tenth studio album was released on 6 May 2013. It features eight new songs and four interpretations including "God Only Knows", "True Colors", and "Lift The Wings" from Riverdance. Said McEvoy, "I'd been listening to a lot of 60s albums, Stones, Beatles, Beach Boys stuff like that and it was with the spirit of those albums in my musical soul that I entered the studio."

"STUFF" McEvoy's eleventh studio album, was released on 21 March 2014. The tracks on the album were compiled to meet the requests from fans for songs they couldn't find elsewhere. McEvoy chose the songs from her collection of single mixes, audiophile tracks, and songs written and performed on other artists' records. McEvoy then went into the studio to record tracks that weren't found in her collection. After all songs were recorded the entire album was re-mastered.

=== 2015–present ===
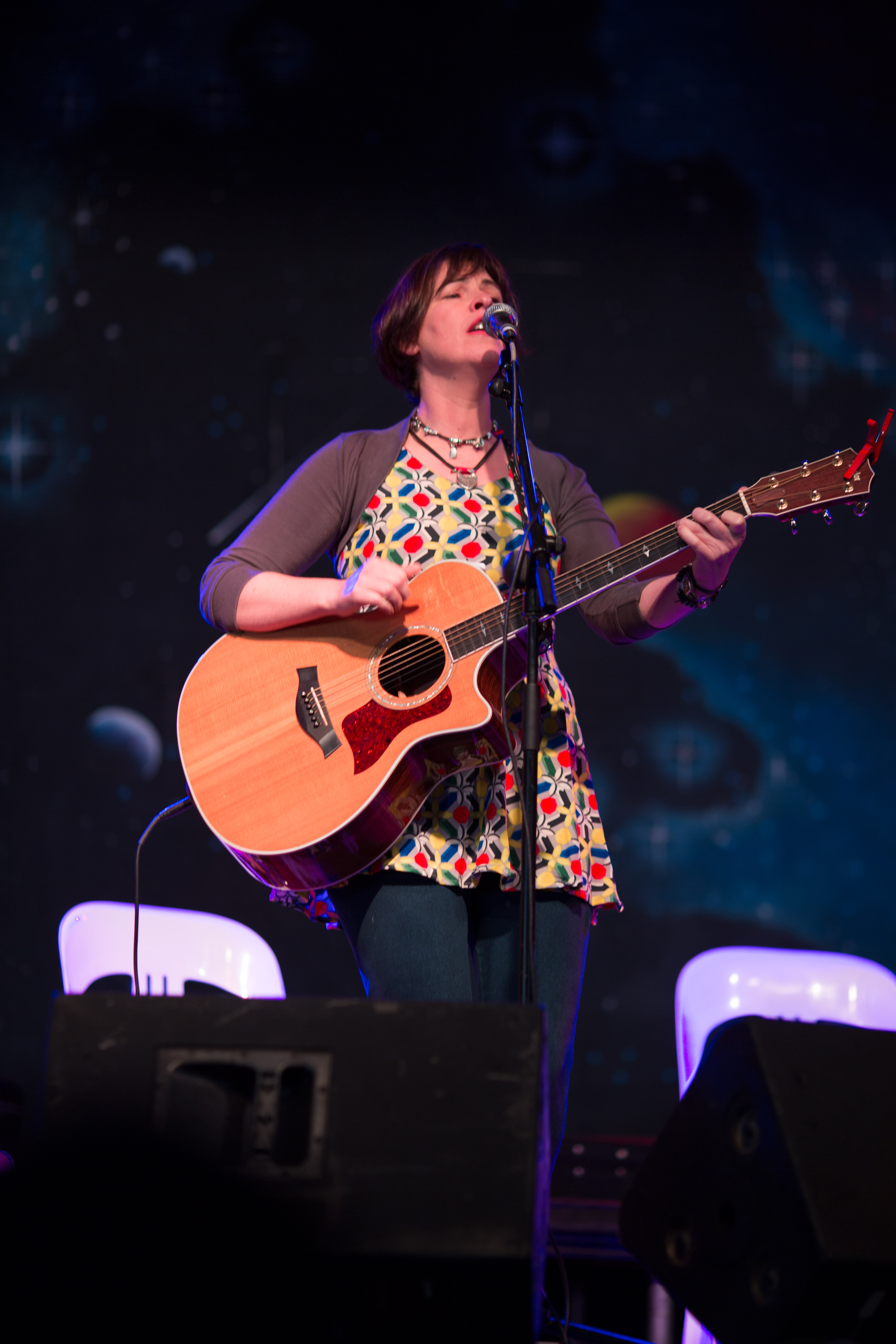
McEvoy in 2014

Naked Music is McEvoy's twelfth studio album, recorded at the Grange Studio in Norfolk, UK.

Also in 2017, she released an album of reinterpretations of the songs of Thomas Moore, The Thomas Moore Project

In January 2019, McEvoy appeared as a contestant on RTÉ's Celebrity Home of the Year.

In 2019, the two-year collaboration with Chris Gollon featured in the three-month major museum retrospective at Huddersfield Art Gallery, showing Gollon's music-related works and including the canvas 'Gimme Some Wine – Final Version', for which Eleanor McEvoy made a special recording of the song 'Gimme Some Wine'.

== "Only a Woman's Heart" ==
"Only a Woman's Heart" written by McEvoy is the title song of the album A Woman's Heart which went on to sell over three-quarters of a million copies in Ireland alone and was (and remains) the biggest selling Irish album of all time.

The song "Only A Woman's Heart" has been covered by a number of artists including:

- Emmylou Harris with Mary Black on Black's 1996 album Wonder Child
- Phil Coulter on his 2005 album Recollections
- French Canadian singer Isabelle Boulay. Boulay's version appeared on her album De retour à la source, which was nominated as one of the five finalists for the 2008 Juno Awards for the category "Francophone Album of The Year".
- Les mejores canciones dance del Siglo XX – Vol. 11, 2011
- Celtic Woman 2012 album Celtic Woman: Believe

"Only A Woman's Heart" also has a page and a half mention in Charles Webb's book New Cardiff, which was made into the movie Hope Springs. Webb's book, The Graduate, was the basis for the award-winning film The Graduate.

2012 marked the twentieth anniversary of A Woman's Heart. The anniversary was celebrated with four sold-out performances at the Olympia Theatre in Dublin, Ireland. Eleanor McEvoy, Mary Coughlan, Sharon Shannon, Dolores Keane, Wallis Bird, and Hermione Hennessy were on the bill.

In April 2012, Kiera Murphy produced a documentary entitled Our Woman's Hearts which explores how A Woman's Heart came about, why it became so popular, as well as the effect it has had on three generations of women. The documentary is a part of RTÉ Radio 1's series Documentary on One.

The Secret of Living, a song written by McEvoy, was released in July 2012 to celebrate the 20th Anniversary of the iconic A Woman's Heart. The song is performed by McEvoy, Mary Coughlan, Sharon Shannon, Gemma Hayes, and Hermione Hennessey. In a review from Hot Press, The Secret of Living was described as a classy new single from the A Woman's Heart group.

== Discography ==
- Eleanor McEvoy – Geffen Records (GEFC/GEFD24606) 1993 Produced by Pat Moran. No longer available replaced by Special Edition (see above)
- What's Following Me? – Columbia Records (484233.2) 1996 Produced by Eleanor McEvoy and Kevin Moloney
- Snapshots – Columbia Records (CK494598.2) 1999 Produced by Rupert Hine
- Yola – Mosco (EMSACD1) 2001 Produced by Eleanor McEvoy and Brian Connor.
- Eleanor McEvoy 'Special Edition' – Market Square (MSMCD127) 2003 {Remastered Geffen album with 4 extra tracks} Produced by Pat Moran.
- Early Hours – Moscodisc / Market Square (MSM1SACD128) 2004 Produced by Brian Connor & Eleanor McEvoy
- Out There – Moscodisc (MOSACD 303) September 2006 Produced by Eleanor McEvoy
- Love Must Be Tough – Moscodisc (MOSCD404) February 2008 Produced by Peter Beckett
- Singled Out – Moscodisc (MOSCD406) September 2009 Various Producers
- I'd Rather Go Blonde – Moscodisc (MOSCD408) September 2010 Produced by Eleanor McEvoy, and Peter Beckett; recorded by Ciaran Byrne; mixed by Ruadhri Cushnan; mastered by Ian Cooper.
- Alone – Moscodisc (MOSCD409) September 2011 Produced by Eleanor McEvoy, recorded by Dave Williams and Ciaran Byrne; mixed by Ciaran Byrne; mastered by Ian Cooper.
- If You Leave... – Moscodisc (MOSCOD4010) March 2013 Produced by Eleanor McEvoy; mixed by Ciaran Byrne; mastered by Ian Cooper at Metropolis Studios; front cover by Tim Staffell.
- Stuff – Moscodisc (MOSCD4111) March 2014 Produced Eleanor McEvoy and Peter Beckett; mixed by Ciaran Byrne; mastered by Ian Cooper at Metropolis Studios except track 11 mastered by Ray Staff
- Naked Music – Moscodisc (MOSCD4014) February 2016 Produced by Ciaran Byrne; engineered by Dave Williams; mastered by Tony Cousins at Metropolis Studios, London
- The Thomas Moore Project – Moscodisc (MOSCD4015) June 2017 Produced by Eleanor McEvoy Recorded and mixed by Ciaran Byrne; mastered by Tony Cousins at Metropolis Studios, London
- Gimme Some Wine - Blue Dandelion Records (BDCD101) October 2021

== Music in film and TV ==
=== Feature and independent films ===
- McEvoy sang Bill Whelan's song "The Seabird" in Some Mother's Son starring Helen Mirren, director Terry George written by Jim Sheridan and Terry George.
- The song "I Hear You Breathing In" features in How To Cheat in the Leaving Certificate starring Mick Lally and Mary McEvoy.
- The song "Whisper a Prayer to the Moon" features in The Nephew starring Pierce Brosnan, Donal McCann, Sinéad Cusack, and Niall Tobin.
- The song "I Hear You Breathing In" features in El vuelo del tren "The Magic of Hope" which was selected by the European Film Promotion in 2012 and nominated to four ASECAN Awards in 2012 and by the Galway Film Fleadh. (director Paco Torres, 2009).

=== Television ===
- The HBO series Six Feet Under featured the song "All I Have", written by Caroline Lavelle and McEvoy.
- "A Glass Unkissed" from the 1996 album What's Following Me? appeared in television network ABC's popular series Clueless.
- American Network PBS's documentary In Our Own Voice features "Easy To Lose Hope" from McEvoy's 1999 album Snapshots. The song, produced by Rupert Hine, is about murdered journalist Veronica Guerin.
- "All I Have" from the 1999 album Snapshots was featured on ABC's One Life to Live, a long-running daytime-TV soap opera.
- McEvoy's song "Only A Woman's Heart" appeared in Irish Network RTÉ's popular soap Glenroe.
- "Days Roll By" from Early Hours (Moscodisc 2004) appears in Fair City, a popular soap about daily life in a Dublin city.

== Super Audio and vinyl ==
McEvoy's fourth album Yola drew favourable attention from the Hi-Fi press and market as one of the first original titles recorded specifically for SACD. With the collaboration of sound designer, the world's first-ever SACD single "Did I Hurt You" (Market Square MSMSACD114) was released from the same album. To this day Yola is regarded as a Hi-Fi industry standard and is used by high-end audio companies to test speakers.

Releasing on compact disc, SACD, and vinyl, McEvoy's albums have won many audio awards. Early Hours was the first to use TiMax (unique audio imaging) technology, mixed in 5.1 surround sound onto multi-channel SACD. McEvoy's album Love Must Be Tough was named Album of the Year by Hi-Fi Plus, the prestigious UK publication, and was released on vinyl in August 2008 by Diverse Vinyl in the UK.

== Books ==
=== Naked Music-The Songbook ===
Naked Music-The Songbook is the first songbook to be published by McEvoy. The publication is a pioneering collaboration between McEvoy and artist Chris Gollon. It includes lyrics and melodies from the songs on McEvoy's 2016 album Naked Music, alongside 24 of Gollon's stunning paintings inspired by the music on the album. Foreword and interviews by Jackie Hayden. ISBN 978-0-9576114-2-9
