= The Wonderful Grand Band (album) =

Studio album by The Wonderful Grand Band
- Released: 1978
- Recorded: May 1978
- Studio: Clode Sound Studio, Stephenville, Newfoundland
- Genre: Rock/Folk
- Length: 35:57
- Label: Quay Records CS-78-014
- Producer: The Wonderful Grand Band

The Wonderful Grand Band chronology
The Wonderful Grand Band (1978)	Living in a Fog (1981)

The Wonderful Grand Band is an eponymous debut album release by The Wonderful Grand Band. The album was inspired by music the band played during a six-part television mini-series on the CBC called The Root Seller. The songs on the album are a mix of traditional music and folk-rock. The album comprises music composed by Émile Benoît and songs written by Ron Hynes. This album features some of Benoît's first recorded music, specifically "Emile's Dream" which later, in 1980, the album of the same name was released by Benoît featuring titles that also appear on The Wonderful Grand Band. The album also features the first and original version of the widely covered "Sonny's Dream" which also appears re-recorded on their second album, Living in a Fog. The album was only available on LP until 2010 when it was reissued for CD.

== Track listing ==
=== Side one ===
1. "The Budgell's Jigs" (Trad.) – 2:42
2. "Sonny's Dream" (Ron Hynes) – 3:14
3. "Just Like a Movie Scene" (R. Hynes) – 3:39
4. "a) The Washroom Reel b) Joe Smallwood's Reel c) The Humours Of Lissadel" (Emile Benoit) – 3:36
5. "One Last Lover" (R. Hynes) – 2:59
6. "Maid In France a) Rufus' Tune b) St. Laurent c) The Maid I Ne'er Forgot" – 3:04

=== Side two ===
1. "Take a Chance On Love" (R. Hynes)- 2:21
2. "For You And Me" (R. Hynes) – 3:27
3. "a) Piccadilly Sand b) Emile's Dream c) The Long Point Reel" (E. Benoit & Trad.)- 3:26
4. "Home On The Island" (R. Hynes) – 3:16
5. "Don't Wake Me Up Too Early" (R. Hynes) – 2:36
6. "The Jig Is Up" (Trad.) – 1:57

== Personnel ==
Band

- Ron Hynes – lead vocals, acoustic guitars, mandolin, banjo
- Kelly Russell – fiddle, mandolin, dulcimer
- Sandy Morris – acoustic & electric lead guitars
- Bryan Hennessey – electric bass, harmonica on 'Take a Chance'
- Bawnie Oulton – vocal harmony
- Glenn Simmons – acoustic & electric guitars, vocal harmony
- Rocky Wiseman – drums

Production

- Neil Bishop – engineer
- Manny Bucheit – photography
- Claude Caines – engineer, punchmaster general,
- The Wonderful Grand Band – producers, cover design & arrangements
