= Snapshots (Eleanor McEvoy album) =

Studio album by Eleanor McEvoy
- Released: 1999
- Genres: Rock, folk rock
- Label: Columbia
- Producer: Rupert Hine

Eleanor McEvoy chronology
What's Following Me? (1996)	Snapshots (1999)	Yola (2001)

Snapshots, Eleanor McEvoy's third studio album, was released in 1999. McEvoy's primary goal was to make Snapshots her most song-oriented album to date. Toward that goal, McEvoy hooked up with producer Rupert Hine (who worked with Stevie Nicks, Tina Turner, Suzanne Vega, and Duncan Sheik). The extensive use of drum loops on the album was a complete change in style from McEvoy's previous work. This is McEvoy's only album on which she does not play violin. Before the overdub sessions, she was attacked whilst walking down the street on the way home from the studio and her hand broken, although she recovered completely. Columbia Records had not been prepared for these changes and not long after the release of Snapshots McEvoy was dropped; her subsequent recordings were on independent labels.

== Critical reception ==
Boston Globe, 1999 "...her sophisticated voice and compassionate seasoned lyrics ... make Eleanor McEvoy’s album a gem."

Irish singer Eleanor McEvoy returns with her third LP, Snapshots. With her rich voice and strong musical background, Eleanor continues to make smart women's music. Snapshots is an album made from a woman's perspective, with a woman's intelligence and attraction. Explains Eleanor, "A great record is like a good friend. It's like somebody you can talk to, who understands you when you're down. Maybe that 'friend' is Loudon Wainwright III, Edith Piaf, or R.E.M., but it's someone who can heal the hurt, and that's what is really important.Snapshots weaves a delicate spell. Give Snapshots a chance to grow on you: you will be rewarded. Randy Krbechek

== Track listing ==
All tracks are written by Eleanor McEvoy, except where noted.

No.	Title	Writer(s)	Length
1.	"There's More To This Woman"		4:24
2.	"All I Have"	Eleanor McEvoy, Caroline Lavelle	4:34
3.	"Did You Tell Him?"		4:23
4.	"Please Heart You're Killing Me"	Eleanor McEvoy, Rodney Crowell	4:40
5.	"To One Who Didn't Know You"		4:22
6.	"Now You Tell Me"		4:50
7.	"Wrapping Me Up In Luxury (Until The Morning Comes)"		3:52
8.	"She Had It All"		4:44
9.	"Territory Of Poets"		4:46
10.	"Sophie"		4:18
11.	"Easy To Lose Hope"		5:53

== Singles ==
- Did You Tell Him
- Please Heart You're Killing Me

== Sophie ==
Sophie, the tenth track on Snapshots, has come to prominence as an anthem for those suffering from eating disorders. The song tells the story of a young girl, Sophie, who has anorexia. Sophie has been used as the soundtrack for dozens of videos across the internet with almost a million combined viewings on YouTube. The videos range from Sims animations, to personal narratives, to photographs showing the effects of eating disorders. The videos have engendered copious comments and have created a forum for people around the world to discuss all aspects of eating disorders.

The phenomenon of Sophie has begun to draw media attention. Since December 2008, McEvoy has discussed the song on the BBC Radio show Woman's Hour, has been featured in an article entitled Web Hit Touches a Chord with Anorexics in the Sunday Observer, has appeared on BBC Breakfast, and has been featured on RTÉ News. Most recently McEvoy was the subject of an article in the Sunday Tribune entitled McEvoy's plea to buy back hit YouTube 'anorexia' song.

== Music in television ==
- American Network PBS’s documentary In Our Own Voice features Easy To Lose Hope. The song, produced by Rupert Hine is about murdered journalist Veronica Guerin.
- All I Have was featured on ABC’s One Life to Live, a long-running daytime TV soap opera.
- The cult HBO series Six Feet Under featured the song All I Have written by Caroline Lavelle and McEvoy.
