= D'Arcy Broderick =

- Born: Bay de Verde, Newfoundland, Canada
- Genres: Folk, folk rock
- Occupation(s): Singer, musician
- Instrument(s): Fiddle, guitar, mandola, banjo, accordion, mandolin

D'Arcy Broderick is a Newfoundland musician who plays fiddle, guitar, mandola, banjo, accordion and mandolin. He is best known as a former member of the popular Irish-Newfoundland bands The Irish Descendants and The Fables. He is currently performing around Newfoundland with the band Middle Tickle. Alongside of him in the band are: William Broderick (Drums), Glenn Hiscock (Mandolin, Fiddle, Vocals), Paul Hiscock (Bass, vocals) and the only remaining original band member Ron Kelly (Guitar, vocals). Glen Hiscock and William Broderick are occasionally absent from the weekly show Middle Tickle plays at Shamrock City Pub. Broderick was one of the owners of Shamrock City Pub, located in Downtown St. John's, Newfoundland. He left Shamrock City in 2017 and opened a new and traditional Irish pub named Broderick's Pub, situated at 201 Water Street in St. John's, in January 2020.

== Early life ==
Broderick, born in Bay de Verde, Newfoundland, Canada, the youngest son of Mary (Noonan) and Kevin Broderick, was introduced to music at a very early age, learning to play various instruments from his father's musical talents. Long considered one of the finest ballad singers in the province, he is also considered one of the best fiddle players in Newfoundland and Labrador.

== Career ==
Broderick's professional career began when he joined the Sons of Erin and from there he became one of the founding members of the successful band The Irish Descendants. With Broderick's multi-talented art with musical instruments and his very traditional Irish voice he performed on three gold records by The Irish Descendants. The band received awards for Entertainers of the Year and Best Roots Traditional Artist and a Juno for Best Roots Traditional Album.

Broderick released his first solo album entitled By Request, recorded at Blair Whalen's at studio in Torbay, Newfoundland and Labrador, in March 2006. Selections on the CD include:

Saint Brendan's Voyage
The Galtee Mountain Boy
New Mown Hay
Streets of New York
Phil The Fluthers Ball
Cliffs of Baccalieu
Jigs: Dr. Keiley-O/Whe're you goin' me silly old man/ Kerry Slide
Black Gold
Shores of Amerikay
Nancy Spain
Daisy a Day
Reels: The leaky roof/ Fiddles on the wall.

== See also ==
- Music of Newfoundland and Labrador
- List of Newfoundland songs
- List of people from Newfoundland and Labrador
