= Alone (Eleanor McEvoy album) =

Studio album by Eleanor McEvoy
- Released: 12 September 2011
- Genre: Rock / folk rock
- Label: Moscodisc
- Producer: Mick O'Gorman, Eleanor McEvoy

Eleanor McEvoy chronology
I'd Rather Go Blonde (2010)	Alone (2011)

Eleanor McEvoy’s 9th studio album Alone is a collection of 12 stripped-down solo numbers, including her single ‘You’ll Hear Better Songs (Than This)’, ‘A Woman’s Heart,’ and a take on P.F. Sloan’s ‘Eve Of Destruction’.

Says McEvoy, "There was a time when I was stranded in a long gap between tour dates and, with time to kill, I headed for the peace of The Grange; a small studio tucked away in the Norfolk countryside. In the converted barn, alone except for Dave the engineer, I stepped up to the microphone and sang my songs. My state of mind wasn’t the brightest, but there was a certain something about being in the studio with no agenda, no deadline, no pressure, it just came out."

== Critical reception ==
Alone a twelve track journey through the art, emotions and mind of this luxuriantly talented artist. If you think there’s a better song than "You’ll hear better songs (than this)" released this year, then you have cloth ears. Her vocals, with that distinctive Dublin burr of hers, are heart-breakingly inspiring, and a counterpoint to the simplicity and accessibility of songs. The combination is an outstandingly listenable mixture that is both instantaneously likeable and insistent enough to be memorable. Liking McEvoy’s work is easy, because it’s beautiful.

FURTHER QUOTES FROM REVIEWS OF Alone

UNCUT "Stripped down and straight to the heart"

Hot Press Magazine ".....discover the raw artistry that distinguishes the truly talented from the also-rans..... McEvoy’s voice has a depth of expression born from living the songs rather than just singing them. It’s a genuine privilege to be on the outside looking in"

Irish Music Magazine "For many she is the benchmark and gold standard for female singer songwriters in Ireland and this CD ensures her seat on that podium……. This is a work that will grow on you slowly, it has pedigree in abundance. Eleanor isn’t afraid to stand alone in the dark and sing it like it is."

Daily Mirror "Stripping back to just herself and a guitar this is an intimate album of raw confessionals"

== Track listings ==
All tracks are written by Eleanor McEvoy, except where noted

No.	Title	Writer(s)	Length
1.	"Did I Hurt You?"		3:30
2.	"Harbour"		3:17
3.	"I'll Be Willing"		3:12
4.	"What's Her Name"		2:31
5.	"You'll Hear Better Songs (Than This)" (electric version)		3:28
6.	"Sophie"		3:48
7.	"Just For The Tourists"	Dave Rotheray, Eleanor McEvoy	3:19
8.	"Days Roll By"		3:24
9.	"For Avoidance of Any Doubt"		3:35
10.	"Only A Woman's Heart"		3:48
11.	"Did You Tell Him"		3:30
12.	"Eve of Destruction"	P.F. Sloan	4:27
13.	"You'll Hear Better Songs (Than This)" (Bonus track, acoustic version)		3:24

== Singles ==
1. You'll Hear Better Songs (Than This)
2. Harbour
