= Naked Music =

Studio album by Eleanor McEvoy
- Released: 5 Feb 2016
- Genre: Rock, folk rock
- Label: Moscodisc
- Producer: Mick O'Gorman

Naked Music is Eleanor McEvoy's twelfth studio album. Naked Music was recorded at the Grange Studio in Norfolk. McEvoy recorded the tracks by “studio-performing,” in other words, playing the songs as she would in a live performance. The album features exclusive artwork by acclaimed British artist Chris Gollon. The seeds for McEvoy and Gollon becoming involved in this “mutual stimulus” were sown when McEvoy bought Gollon's painting ‘Champagne Sheila’ after spotting it in a London gallery. In February 2015, while on tour in the UK, McEvoy visited Gollon's exhibition “Incarnation, Mary and Women from the Bible” in Norwich Cathedral in Norwich. That evening Gollon attended McEvoy's sold-out show in The Bicycle Shop. McEvoy asked Gollon if he would be interested in doing the art work for the cover of Naked Music. Gollon agreed and was so taken with the songs he completed four paintings in response - two on the ‘Naked’ theme, and two related to song titles and lyrics. McEvoy was so pleased with paintings she used all four in Naked Music CD artwork. Chris Gollon was so taken with the songs, and how they let a man into a woman's thought and how a woman desires a man, that he painted a further 23 paintings inspired by the songs. The album NAKED MUSIC was then launched in London in the exhibition, curated by IAP Fine Art in January 2016. Later the same year Hot Press, Dublin, published NAKED MUSIC: The Songbook, documenting the unique McEvoy/Gollon artistic boundary crossing, with text and interviews with McEvoy and Gollon by Jackie Hayden, juxtaposed with the paintings and song scores.

== Critical reception ==
...another truly high fidelity studio ‘live’ recording one that takes ‘minimalism’ to a whole new level. It proves, again, that all you need to make a great record is the singer, and the song And she does just that with an a cappella version of ‘The DJ’ (lifted from her 2004 album Early Hours) where she impressively carries the melody with just her vocals...But in its own right, the gentle, whiskey drinking, candle watching music of Naked Music is hard to fault. Few could compare under the glare of such a bright spotlight. Eleanor shines.

A no-brainer: take a singer adored by audiophiles for all the right reasons-great music and great recording....'The DJ' - in a cappella - is a track that will make any hi-fi sound incredible. A display of emotion and intimacy as naked as the title suggests, this CD happens to sound astonishing, too.

Quietly set, sparse and rewarding, "Naked Music", Eleanor McEvoy

...this is undiluted, lean McEvoy with sparse use of acoustic or electric guitars, tapping on an acoustic guitar, singing a cappella, the songs self-penned or co-written with Lloyd Cole or Rodney Crowell. Heady stuff for that alone, but this has even more resonance for me: I heard her play a selection of the tracks, armed only with guitar, at a gallery showing paintings by the artist who inspired them. (Chris Gollon) Rushing home to hear it on my system, hell yeah - it's as close to 'real' as you get, short of seeing her live (which I recommend). Unbridled, intimate gorgeousness. KK

== Track listings ==
All tracks are written by Eleanor McEvoy, except where otherwise noted:

No.	Title	Writer(s)	Length
1.	"Wrong So Wrong"		2:45
2.	"Dreaming of Leaving"	McEvoy, Lloyd Cole	2:44
3.	"Deliver Me"		3:07
4.	"Whisper A Prayer To The Moon"		3:36
5.	"Heaven Help Us"		3:36
6.	"Land In The Water"	McEvoy, David Rotheray, Nat Johnson	2:59
7.	"Please Heart You're Killing Me"	McEvoy, Rodney Crowell	3:37
8.	"The DJ"		2:11
9.	"Lubbock Woman"	Terry Allen	2:28
10.	"Look Like Me"		3.00
11.	"Half Out Of Habit"		2:50
12.	"Isn't It A Little Late"		1:49
13.	"Oft In The Stilly Night"		1:49
14.	"The Thought Of You"		3:05
