= Stuff (Eleanor McEvoy album) =

Studio album by Eleanor McEvoy
- Released: 21 March 2014
- Genre: Rock, folk rock
- Label: Moscodisc
- Producer: Mick O'Gorman, Eleanor McEvoy, Ciaran Byrne

Stuff is Eleanor McEvoy's eleventh studio album. The tracks on the album were compiled to meet the requests from fans for songs they couldn't find elsewhere. McEvoy chose the songs from her collection of single mixes, audiophile tracks, and songs written and performed on other artists records. McEvoy then went into the studio to record tracks that weren't found in her collection. After all songs were recorded the entire album was re-mastered. On 14 March 2014 Stuff was named Album of the Week on RTÉ Radio 1

== Critical reception ==
McEvoy has a Voice with a capital ‘V’ - instantly recognisable despite have a huge range of expression and syles. This is demonstrated in spades as this is a collection of songs rescued from the threat of obscurity, inevitably more wide-ranging in style and substance than material specifically written for one album. That it hangs together as a great listening experience is testament to McEvoy’s great talent.

That’s the great voice of Eleanor McEvoy, terrific, country music with an Irish flavour, you can’t beat it

As one of the most respected Irish singer/songwriters in the business, Eleanor McEvoy's talent has never let up, and she's back with a brand new compilation of tracks that were influenced by comments from fans.

Inevitably then, Stuff is a mixed bag that'll thrill completists, but it will also move many more of the simply curious than you might have previously thought.

== Track listings ==
No.	Title	Writer(s)	Length
1.	"The Thought Of You"	Eleanor McEvoy	3:37
2.	"Memphis Tennessee"	Chuck Berry	2:15
3.	"Milord"	Georges Moustaki, Marguerite Monnot	3:55
4.	"Please Heart You're Killing Me"	Rodney Crowell, Eleanor McEvoy	4:05
5.	"Don't Blame The Tune"	Eleanor McEvoy	4:17
6.	"Take A Little Look"	Eleanor McEvoy	3:21
7.	"Take You Home"	Eleanor McEvoy	3:16
8.	"Whistle For The Choir"	The Fratellis	3.35
9.	"Deliver Me"	Eleanor McEvoy	3:11
10.	"The Night May Still Be Young, But I Am Not"	Dave Rotheray, Eleanor McEvoy	3.53
11.	"Lovers Chapel"	Dave Rotheray, Eleanor McEvoy	3:55
