= Ron Hynes =

Canadian singer-songwriter (1950–2015)

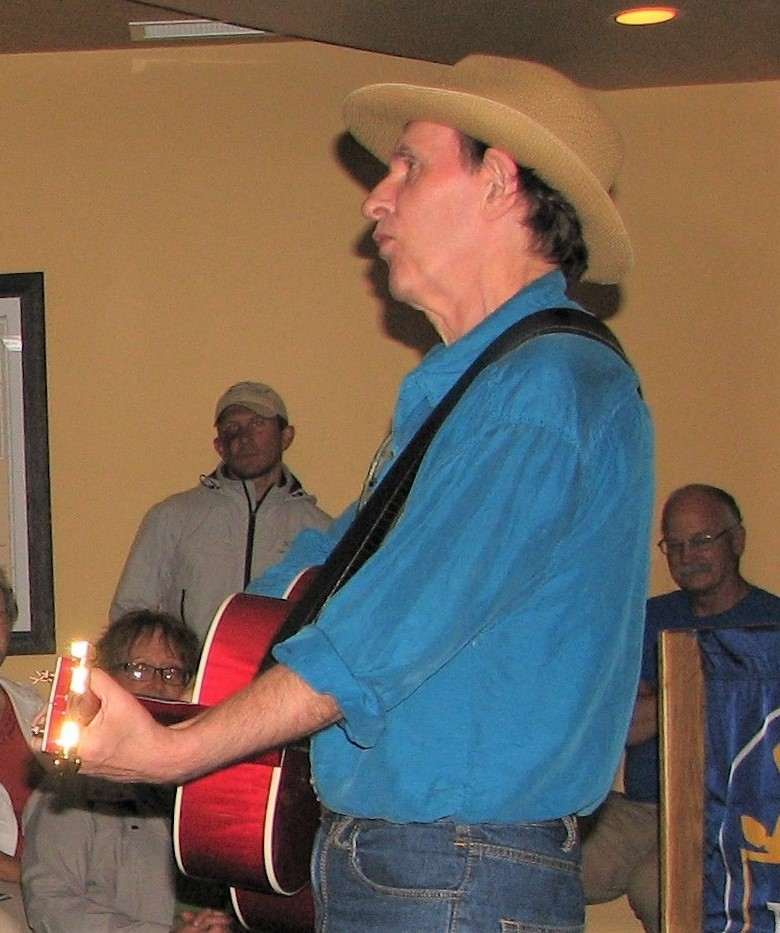
- Hynes performing in Gros Morne

Background information
- Born: December 7, 1950; St. John's, Newfoundland and Labrador, Canada
- Died: November 19, 2015 (aged 64) St. John's, Newfoundland and Labrador, Canada
- Genres: Folk, Country
- Occupation: Singer-songwriter
- Years active: 1972–2015
- Labels: World Records (1972); Grand East Records (1978); Lost Island (1990); EMI (1993); Borealis Records (2003)
- Formerly of: Wonderful Grand Band
- Website: Hynesite.ca

Ron Hynes (December 7, 1950 – November 19, 2015) was a folk singer-songwriter from Newfoundland and Labrador. He was especially known for his composition "Sonny's Dream", which has been recorded worldwide by many artists and was named the 41st greatest Canadian song of all time on the 2005 CBC Radio One series 50 Tracks: The Canadian Version.

== Biography ==
Ron Hynes was born in St. John's, Newfoundland and Labrador in December 1950, and raised in Ferryland. He was a founding member of The Wonderful Grand Band, one of Newfoundland's most popular performing groups, and has released seven solo albums. His debut album, Discovery, released in 1972, was the first album composed of totally original content by a Newfoundland artist. Hynes is a seven-time East Coast Music Awards winner, and past Juno and Canadian Country Music Awards nominee. He was named Artist of the Year ('92) and was presented with the prestigious Arts Achievement Award (2004) by the Newfoundland/Labrador Arts Council. In 2002, Hynes received an honorary Doctor of Letters from Memorial University in St. John's in recognition of his original songwriting and his contribution to the cultural heritage of Newfoundland. In 2006, Hynes was honored as the recipient of the St. John's Folk Arts Council's Lifetime Achievement Award.

Widely regarded as one of Canada's premier singer-songwriters with a career spanning over 30 years, Hynes' songs have become part of the fabric of Newfoundland culture. His work is also known outside the province; Hynes' songs have been covered worldwide by over 100 artists, including Emmylou Harris, Valdy and Christy Moore.

Most recently, Hynes was the winner of Male Solo Recording of the Year at the 2007 East Coast Music Awards, and picked up three awards at the 2006 MusicNL awards show in November 2006. The awards included Entertainer of the Year, Songwriter of the Year and Folk/Roots Artist of the Year.

Hynes narrated two audiobooks for Rattling Books, Hard Light: 32 Little Stories by Michael Crummey and Death on the Ice by Cassie Brown.

He also had occasional acting roles, including in the films The Adventure of Faustus Bidgood, Secret Nation, Anchor Zone, Violet and The Bingo Robbers, and the television series Dooley Gardens and Emily of New Moon.

== Illness and death ==
In July 2012, it was announced that Ron Hynes was diagnosed with throat cancer. On August 11, 2012, Hynes performed to a sold-out crowd of more than 3,000 at the Mile One Centre in St. John's. This was his last performance before undergoing cancer treatment. The concert included a reunion of Hynes' old band, The Wonderful Grand Band. In the fall of 2013, he was in remission and back on tour, including participation in a Vinyl Cafe tour broadcast on CBC Radio. Hynes died at a hospital in St. John's on November 19, 2015, at the age of 64.

After Hynes' death, actor and writer Joel Thomas Hynes, his nephew, announced on Facebook that Hynes suffered from drug addictions that led to his demise. "He remained a hardcore addict right to his final days. And it killed him," said Joel Thomas Hynes.

== Stage and screen career ==
Hynes had starred on screen and stage as an actor/writer in numerous roles dating back to the 1970s, including The Bard of Prescott Street, "Wonderful Grand Band", The Best of CODCO, Hank Williams: The Show He Never Gave, The Island Opry Show, The Lost Island Opry, Secret Nation, Anchor Zone and Dooley Gardens.

== Tributes ==
An independent tribute album, entitled 11:11 – Newfoundland Women Sing Songs by Ron and Connie Hynes, was released in 1997, with various female artists performing songs written by Ron Hynes and his ex-wife Connie.

A documentary on Hynes, entitled Man of a Thousand Songs and directed by William D. MacGillivray, debuted at the 2010 Toronto International Film Festival.

The 2023 tribute album Sonny Don't Go Away featured versions of Hynes's songs performed by artists such as Tim Baker, Alan Doyle, The Once, Fortunate Ones, Amelia Curran, The Ennis Sisters, Rum Ragged, Matthew Byrne, The Dardanelles and Kellie Loder.

== Discography ==
=== Albums ===
Year	Album	Label
1972	Discovery	World Records/Audat
1978	The Wonderful Grand Band (with The Wonderful Grand Band)	Quay Records
1981	Living in a Fog (with The Wonderful Grand Band)	Grand East Records
1987	Small Fry: The Ron Hynes Album for Children	Independent
1993	Cryer's Paradise	EMI
1997	Face to the Gale	EMI
1998	Standing in Line in the Rain	Independent
2001	The Sandcastle Sessions	Independent
2003	Get Back Change	Borealis
2006	Ron Hynes	Borealis
2010	Stealing Genius	Borealis
2016	Later That Same Life	

=== Singles ===
Year	Single	CAN Country	Album
1990	"Story of My Life"	—	singles only
1990	"Sonny's Dream"	79	singles only
1993	"Cryer's Paradise"	18	Cryer's Paradise
1993	"Man of a Thousand Songs"	13	Cryer's Paradise
1994	"No Kathleen"	10	Cryer's Paradise
1994	"Atlantic Blue"	—	Cryer's Paradise
1994	"Roy Orbison Came On"	18	Cryer's Paradise
1997	"Godspeed"	36	Face to the Gale
1998	"Constance"	—	Face to the Gale

== Videography ==
- Cryer's Paradise, 1993;
- Godspeed, 1997;
- Ron Hynes – The Irish Tour, 2000 (full-length documentary);
- A Good Dog Is Lost, 2002;
- Record Man, 2003.
- THE MAN OF A THOUSAND SONGS, 2010, (feature documentary).

== Awards and nominations ==
- 2007 ECMA
  - won Male Artist of the Year
  - nominated Album of the Year for the album Ron Hynes
  - nominated Entertainer of the Year
  - nominated Songwriter of the Year for the song Dry
- 2004 ECMA
  - won Album of the Year for the album Get Back Change
  - won Country Recording of the Year for the album Get Back Change
- 1999 ECMA
  - nominated Male Artist of the Year
- 1998 ECMA
  - nominated Country Recording of the Year
  - nominated Male Artist of the Year
  - nominated Songwriter of the Year for the song Godspeed
  - nominated Video of the Year for Godspeed
- 1994 ECMA
  - nominated Album of the Year for album Cryer's Paradise
  - won Country Recording of the Year
  - won Male Artist of the Year
  - won Song of the Year for the song Man of a Thousand Songs
  - nominated Video of the Year for Cryer's Paradise
- 1992 ECMA
  - nominated Song of the Year for the song Never Met a Liar
- 1991 ECMA
  - nominated Male Artist of the Year
- 2009 SOCAN Awards
  - won National Achievement Award
