= Dooley Gardens =

Canadian television sitcom

- Genre: Sitcom
- Directed by: Graeme Campbell; Giles Walker; Henry Sarwer-Foner
- Starring: Mary Walsh; Andy Jones; Nicole de Boer; Andrew Younghusband; Ron Hynes
- Country of origin: Canada
- Original language: English
- No. of seasons: 1
- No. of episodes: 6

Production
- Producer: Mary Sexton

Original release
- Network: CBC Television
- Release: March 3 – April 7, 1999

Dooley Gardens is a Canadian television sitcom that aired on CBC Television in 1999.

The series is set in a hockey rink in St. John's, Newfoundland and Labrador, inherited by Skye Dooley (Nicole de Boer) after the death of her father. The show's cast also includes Mary Walsh as canteen operator Marilyn Benoit, Andy Jones as manager Eddie Hawco, Andrew Younghusband as the possibly-crazy zamboni driver Tracy, and Ron Hynes as Johnny Shea. Younghusband and Edward Riche were the show's writers.

The show's pilot aired on CBC Television in October 1997, and the regular series had a six-episode run beginning on March 3, 1999.

Danielle House made a guest appearance on the series as Wanda, Tracy's ex-girlfriend.

At the 14th Gemini Awards, Giles Walker was shortlisted for Best Direction in a Comedy Program or Series for the episode "The Wedding".
