= Sonny's Dream =

Song

"Sonny's Dream" (also known as "Sonny") is a folk song written by Newfoundlander Ron Hynes in 1976. It tells the story of a man who wishes to fulfill his dreams, but is bound to his rural homeland by his family, particularly his lonely mother. Hynes wrote the song while on a roadtrip with his band in western Canada and based it on his uncle, Thomas "Sonny" O'Neill, who had taught him how to play guitar and had pushed him to play music professionally. It was first recorded by The Wonderful Grand Band on their eponymous album in 1978, but appeared re-recorded on their second album Living in a Fog in 1981. Subsequent to the songwriter Ron Hynes' death, a crowd was organized for a singalong in Bannerman Park, St. John's in remembrance and celebration of his life.

The song is popular not only in Atlantic Canada, but in some parts of the United States and has been covered by many other artists, including Hamish Imlach, Great Big Sea, Christy Moore, The Corsairs, Emmylou Harris, Stan Rogers, Valdy, Allison Crowe, Hayley Westenra, Jean Redpath, and Corey Hart.

It was covered by Kellie Loder on the 2023 Hynes tribute album Sonny Don't Go Away.

== Scottish and Irish versions ==
The song was heard by Scottish artist Hamish Imlach while on a trip to Canada, who modified it somewhat and played it in folk-clubs in Britain. There it was heard by Christy Moore who recorded it and passed it on to other artists in Ireland. Moore recorded the song on his Ride On album in 1984 and Imlach recorded it on his Sonny's Dream album in 1985. A version titled "Sonny" was recorded by Mary Black for the compilation album, A Woman's Heart in 1992, which became the best-selling album in Irish history. Liam Clancy has subsequently recorded the song with Hynes's original lyrics.

== Chart performance ==
Chart (1990)	Peak position
Canada Country Singles (RPM)	79

Sonny's Dream sung by Tom Dillon, at the Volunteer pub, Sidmouth, Aug 2001 Full Version

== See also ==
- 50 Tracks#50 Tracks: The Canadian Edition (2005)
