= Early Hours =

Studio album by Eleanor McEvoy
- Released: March 2004
- Genre: Rock / folk rock
- Label: Moscodisc / Market Square
- Producer: Eleanor McEvoy, Brian Connor

Eleanor McEvoy chronology
| Yola (2001) | Early Hours (2004) | Out There (2006) |

Early Hours is Eleanor McEvoy's fifth studio album. Its style differs from her previous work with its collection of songs incorporating many musical styles including folk, jazz and blues. The album has McEvoy on vocals, guitar and fiddle. The album's co-producer, Brian Connor, accompanies her on piano, Hammond and a variety of keyboards. Also on the album are the drummer/percussionist Liam Bradley, Calum McColl on guitar, the bass guitarist Nicky Scott and Lindley Hamilton on trumpet. Early Hours was the first album to use TiMax (unique audio imaging) technology, mixed in 5.1 surround sound onto multi-channel super audio compact disc Super Audio Compact Disc (SACD).

== Critical reception ==
According to The Living Tradition, "This is another superbly produced and crafted album from one of Ireland's most accomplished female singer-songwriters - it's a very fine collection crossing over into many musical styles - Celtic, country, folk, jazz and blues - and makes for intensely rewarding listening...... I honestly can't fault this beautifully crafted album."

== Track listings ==
All tracks are written by Eleanor McEvoy, except where noted

| No. | Title | Writer(s) | Length |
|---|---|---|---|
| 1. | "You'll Hear Better (Than This)" | | 3:40 |
| 2. | "Memphis Tennessee" | Chuck Berry | 2:35 |
| 3. | "The D.J." | | 3:03 |
| 4. | "I'll Be Willing" | | 3:49 |
| 5. | "Driving Home From Butler's" | | 1:45 |
| 6. | "Ave Maria" | | 3:25 |
| 7. | "Make Mine A Small One" | | 3:27 |
| 8. | "Slipping Away" | | 3:16 |
| 9. | "Sail Me High" | | 4:24 |
| 10. | "Days Roll By" | | 3:25 |
| 11. | "Where Did My Life Go?" | Bert Jansch | 2:26 |
| 12. | "At The End Of The Day" | | 4:30 |
| 13. | "Anach Cuain" | | 2:15 |

== Singles ==
- "Make Mine A Small One"
- "I'll Be Willing"
- "Days Roll By"

== Super audio ==
Early Hours was released in hybrid CD/SACD format, with multi-channel surround mix.

== Vinyl ==
Early Hours (MOSV101) was released on vinyl in 2004 by Mosco Vinyl

== Awards ==
Early Hours was voted Best Contemporary Album 2004-2005 by Irish Music Magazine Readers Poll.
