= Love Must Be Tough =

Studio album by Eleanor McEvoy
- Released: February 2008
- Genre: Rock / folk rock
- Label: Moscodisc
- Producer: Peter Beckett and Mick O'Gorman

Eleanor McEvoy chronology
| Out There (2006) | Love Must Be Tough (2008) | Singled Out (2009) |

Love Must Be Tough is Eleanor McEvoy's seventh studio album, released in February 2008. Unlike her previous six albums, which, with the exception of a few tracks, were written solely by McEvoy, Love Must Be Tough is a mixture of covers/interpretations and self-penned selections.

The album's theme of turning 40 amid mid-life crises is exemplified by the opening track, a fresh interpretation of The Rolling Stones song "Mother's Little Helper". The following eleven tracks continue this theme right up to the closing track, which takes a new look at Nick Lowe's rock classic "I Knew the Bride (When She Used to Rock 'n Roll)".

In October 2008 Love Must Be Tough was named Record of the Year by Hi-Fi+ Magazine.

== Track listings ==
| No. | Title | Writer(s) | Length |
|---|---|---|---|
| 1. | "Mother's Little Helper" | Mick Jagger, Keith Richards | 2:57 |
| 2. | "Love Must Be Tough" | Eleanor McEvoy, Johnny Rivers | 4:00 |
| 3. | "Old New Borrowed and Blue" | Eleanor McEvoy, Dave Rotheray | 3:33 |
| 4. | "Lubbock Woman" | Terry Allen | 2.56 |
| 5. | "If You Want Me to Stay" | Sylvester Stewart | 2:26 |
| 6. | "Roll Out Better Days" | Eleanor McEvoy | 3:32 |
| 7. | "The Night May Still Be Young, But I Am Not" | Eleanor McEvoy, Dave Rotheray | 3:50 |
| 8. | "Hands Off Him" | Bowman, McShann | 2:49 |
| 9. | "Shame on the Moon" | Rodney Crowell | 4:45 |
| 10. | "Easy In Love" | Eleanor McEvoy, Brad Parker | 4:09 |
| 11. | "He Never Spoke Spanish To Me" | Butch Hancock | 3:20 |
| 12. | "I Knew The Bride (When She Used To Rock 'n Roll)" | Nick Lowe | 3:49 |
| 13. | "Whistle for the Choir" (Available only on SACD version) | The Fratellis | 3:33 |
| 14. | "Please Heart, You're Killing Me" (Available only on SACD version) | Eleanor McEvoy, Rodney Crowell | 4:05 |

== Singles ==
- Easy In Love
- Old New Borrowed and Blue
- Shame On The Moon

== Other formats ==
Love Must Be Tough was released in Hybrid Stereo SACD format in May 2008, and on vinyl (LDIV012) in September 2008.
