= A Woman's Heart (compilation album) =

Compilation album by various
- Released: July 1992
- Genre: Folk
- Label: Dara Records
- Producer: Joe O'Reilly

A Woman's Heart is a compilation of twelve tracks performed by six female Irish artists, namely Eleanor McEvoy, Mary Black, Dolores Keane, Sharon Shannon, Frances Black and Maura O'Connell. The album was released in July 1992 and sold over 750,000 copies, more than any other album in Irish chart history and nearly one million copies worldwide.

The 20th anniversary of its release was celebrated with four sold-out performances at the Olympia Theatre in Dublin, Ireland. Eleanor McEvoy, Mary Coughlan, Sharon Shannon, Dolores Keane, Wallis Bird and Hermione Hennessy were on the bill.

In April 2012, Kiera Murphy produced a documentary entitled Our Woman's Hearts which explores how A Woman's Heart came about, why it became so popular, and the effect it has had on three generations of some Irish women. The documentary was a part of RTÉ Radio 1's series Documentary on One.

The RTÉ Concert Orchestra performed an orchestrated version of the album with McEvoy, O'Connell and Wallis Bird in February 2020 at the National Concert Hall, and a similar concert has been announced for May 2022 in the Bord Gáis Energy Theatre.

"The Secret of Living", written by Eleanor McEvoy was released in July 2012 to celebrate the 20th Anniversary of the A Woman's Heart. The song is performed by Eleanor McEvoy, Mary Coughlan, Sharon Shannon, Gemma Hayes and Hermione Hennessey.

== Track listing ==
1. "Only a Woman's Heart" (Eleanor McEvoy) – Eleanor McEvoy and Mary Black
2. "Caledonia" (Dougie MacLean) – Dolores Keane
3. "Vanities" (Noel Brazil) – Mary Black
4. "Blackbird" (traditional) – Sharon Shannon
5. "Wall of Tears" (Richard Leigh / Peter McCann) – Frances Black
6. "Summerfly" (Cheryl Wheeler) – Maura O'Connell
7. "The Island" (Paul Brady) – Dolores Keane
8. "I Hear You Breathing In" (McEvoy) – Eleanor McEvoy
9. "Sonny" (Ron Hynes; last verse added by Hamish Imlach) – Mary Black
10. "Coridinio" (traditional) – Sharon Shannon
11. "Living in These Troubled Times" (Sam Hogin, Roger Cook and Philip Donnelly) – Maura O'Connell
12. "After the Ball" (traditional) – Frances Black
