= Out There (Eleanor McEvoy album) =

Studio album by Eleanor McEvoy
- Released: September 2006
- Genre: Rock, folk rock
- Label: Mosco Disc
- Producer: Mick O'Gorman, Eleanor McEvoy

Eleanor McEvoy chronology
Early Hours (2004)	Out There (2006)	Love Must Be Tough (2008)

Out There is Eleanor McEvoy's sixth studio album. McEvoy, a multi-instrumentalist, produced and arranged Out There, and played all instruments on the album and supplied all vocals. The album includes ten new compositions by McEvoy plus two co-writes with the Beautiful South's Dave Rotheray. On track 5, Vigeland's Dream, McEvoy eloquently describes a walk she once took in Vigeland Sculpture Park which is a part of Frogner Park (Frognerparken), a public park located in the borough of Frogner, in Oslo, Norway. The album also includes an updated version of Marvin Gaye's classic "Mercy Mercy Me (The Ecology)" as well as a new version of Lowell George's "Roll Um Easy."

== Critical reception ==
Out There received a good review and a four and a half star rating from Pete Whalley and Jason Ritchie of the website Get Ready to ROCK! The album was awarded "Record of the Year" from Hi-Fi+ Magazine in 2007.

== Track listings ==
All tracks are written by Eleanor McEvoy, except where noted

No.	Title	Writer(s)	Length
1.	"Non Smoking Single Female"		3:21
2.	"To Sweep Away A Fool"		3:31
3.	"Wrong So Wrong"		2:09
4.	"Little Look"		3:21
5.	"Vigeland's Dream"		3:47
6.	"Mercy Mercy Me (The Ecology)"		3:26
7.	"Quote I Love You Unquote"	Eleanor McEvoy, Dave Rotheray	4:20
8.	"So Much Trouble"		3:56
9.	"Three Nights In November"		4:30
10.	"Suffer So Well"		4:29
11.	"The Way You Wear Your Troubles"		2:21
12.	"(When You) Smile"		3:24
13.	"Fields of Dublin 4"		3:38
14.	"Interlude – Iberius"		0:50
15.	"Roll Um Easy"	Lowell George	2:27

== Singles ==
- "Non Smoking Single Female"
- "Suffer So Well"
- "Wrong So Wrong" (disc contains bonus video of Wrong So Wrong)

== Formats ==
Out There was released in Hybrid Stereo SACD format, and on vinyl in 2007 by Diverse Vinyl (DIV 010LP).
