= Hermione (Hennessy) Ross =

- Born: Hermione Ross; February 7, 1966 (age 60); Sutton, London, England

Hermione Ross (born 7 February 1966) is a British singer-songwriter and joint owner of H&I Music. She is the daughter of Irish singer-songwriter Christie Hennessy. Her debut album Songs My Father Taught Me (Warner Brothers Ireland) stayed at number one in the Irish indie charts for five weeks.

== Background ==
Hermione Ross grew up in Sutton in South London with her parents Christie and Gill Ross. Her mother, originally from Sweden, met her singer-songwriter father in a Soho disco. Ross has two younger siblings, musician and record label manager Amber Ross and producer Tim Ross from electro band Cash + David.

== Career ==
Ross joined Zomba/Jive records (part of Zomba Group of Companies) in 1988 as Promotions Manager, eventually becoming Creative Director.

Ross managed the career of her father, singer songwriter Christie Hennessy, from 1992 when he released his album The Rehearsal, until his last album, The Two of Us, which was released the year of his death in 2007. They dueted on several singles including "If I Were To Fall". Ross sang on several of her father's albums. The father and daughter team also produced and released the album From the Heart by Aled Jones on Telstar in 2000.

In 2010, Ross recorded her debut album, Songs My Father Taught Me, which went to number one in the Irish Indie Charts. Father and daughter dueted together in the album on the track "Soho Square".

In 2011, Ross joined Willie Nelson and Leona Lewis on tour in Ireland with songs from the album.

== Music management ==
Ross began her own music management company Black and Blonde in 2005 with Jo Hart

In 2010, she set up H&I Music Management with her sister Amber Ross. The pair have since worked with acts and producers including Phil Ramone, Dionne Warwick, Gardar Thor Cortes, Cash + David, Kamaliya, former X Factor contestant Ruth Lorenzo, Aura Dione, Kevin Ahart and Karen Ruimy. Ross now manages girl group L2M who are signed to Warner Music Group.

== Meet the Russians ==
Ross appeared on the hit TV series Meet the Russians with the Ukrainian pop star Kamaliya. The show followed Kamaliya and her husband Mohammad Zahoor as they moved to London to pursue Kamaliya’s music career.
