= The Irish Descendants =

Canadian folk music group

- Origin: St. John's, Newfoundland and Labrador
- Genres: Celtic, folk, celtic rock,
- Years active: 1990–present
- Labels: Warner, Koch, Kells, Fontana Distribution, Avondale
- Members: Con O'Brien; Rowan Sherlock; Madeline Carter; Jeff Kinsman
- Past members: See Member history
- Website: https://theirishdescendants.com/

The Irish Descendants are a folk group from St. John's, Newfoundland and Labrador, Canada. All the members, born of Irish emigrants, were workers in the Newfoundland fishing industry before forming the band in 1990 out of the remnants of two former Newfoundland bands – The Descendants and Irish Coffee.

The group helped to popularise traditional Newfoundland music to a wider Canadian audience in the early 1990s, along with other bands such as Great Big Sea. Their popularity within the province itself led to their selection as the official band of the province's 500th anniversary celebrations, during which they performed for the Queen.

Tension within the group caused co-frontman D'Arcy Broderick to leave soon after this period, and their lineup has frequently changed since then, with frontman Con O'Brien being the only constant member. Regular touring and occasional album releases, most recently The 35x35 collection in 2024, have kept the group in the public eye.

== History ==
In the summer of 1986, Con O’Brien and Ronnie Power of Bay Bulls teamed up with Thomas Battcock of Brigus South to form The Descendants. After Battcock's departure due to other commitments, Power and O'Brien teamed up with multi-instrumentalist and vocalist D'Arcy Broderick of Bay De Verde and Bassist Larry Martin of Grates Cove to form the new band The Irish Descendants.

In 1991, the Descendants recorded their first album, Misty Morning Shore, produced by Gary O'Driscoll. It caught the attention of Warner Music and they signed the band following up with their major label debut Look To The Sea in 1993. The record was successful, and was followed by 1994's Gypsies and Lovers, which saw the band expanded to include drummer Gerard Broderick and keyboardist Kathy Phippard. The album won the band the Roots & Traditional Album of the Year award at the Juno Awards, as well as the Entertainer of the Year award at the East Coast Music Awards.

Their 1996 album, Livin' On The Edge, featured a contemporary country sound which caused a rift in the band. At a New Year's Eve show in the group's hometown of St. John's, Broderick and O'Brien engaged in a fight backstage, which culminated in Broderick leaving the group. The official reason cited was "irreconcilable musical differences." His departure occurred just before a tour with Anne Murray, and the band's rush to fill his shoes led them to Eamonn O'Rourke, an Irish fiddler living in New York City, who joined the band for a short time. He played with them on 1998's Rollin' Home; this proved the group's last album with Ronnie Power and Larry Martin, who departed in 2000, and their last original album for Warner. The label released a final, compilation album entitled So Far So Good in 1999.

In 2001, the group resurfaced with a new lineup: O'Brien joined forces with St. John's musician Mike Hanrahan, as well as veteran players Byron Pardy, Kelly Russell and Paul 'Boomer' Stamp (all of whom had played, as guests, on Rollin' Home). This new lineup released Blooming Bright Star on Koch Records, produced once again by Derek Harrington. The disc featured Great Big Sea guesting on vocals on the track 'Step It Out Mary', as well as covers of songs by Gerry Rafferty and Paul Brady.

The group also released a Christmas album, The Gift, the following year. (The disc was re-released in 2006 on Newfoundland label Avondale Music.) However, Kelly Russell left the band in 2003 due to their extensive touring schedule; Graham Wells, a St. John's musician known for his multi-instrumental capabilities (although especially proficient on the accordion) joined in the same year. Pardy was to follow suit soon; at this time, brothers Glenn and Paul Hiscock (performing fiddle and bass, respectively) of the St. John's band Connemara came into the fold.

Guest musician Bob Pike of Shanneyganock played bass on 2004's Across the Water, released on the Kells Music label; the change in distribution enabled the band's new music to be released in America. The album hit the top of the North American Irish music sales charts. A second compilation followed, entitled We Are the Irish Descendants. Stamp left the band in 2004.

2007 saw the release of Southern Shore, produced by Alan Doyle of Great Big Sea, who also co-wrote the track "Not for the Money Alone" with O'Brien and played on several songs; Great Big Sea also guested on the song "Downtown Girl." The album also featured the group's first song recorded without O'Brien, "No Con Test." In 2009, the Hiscock brothers took a temporary break from touring, replaced in the lineup by various musicians (and for one tour, Kelly Russell). Later in the year, the pair were replaced permanently by Toronto native Duncan Cameron and Newfoundland musician Robert Kelly.

A third compilation, titled Encore: The Best of the Irish Descendants Volume 2 was also released, this time by Avondale. 2010 marked the group's 20th anniversary, celebrated with a series of shows in western and central Canada, as well as a closing performance at the 34th Newfoundland and Labrador Folk Festival, in St. John's. In addition, another lineup change was evident: Wells departed, and veteran Dave Panting (formerly of Rawlins Cross) joined the band.

The band is noted for its heavy touring schedule. They have played overseas, notably at the International Festival of the Sea in England, although the majority of their work has been in North America, particularly Canada. Upon the celebration of Newfoundland's quincentennial in 1996, the group was selected as one of the official entertainers, and as such performed for the representatives of the monarchy, including Queen Elizabeth II. They continue to play regularly.

On 19 September 2021, the band reunited with all of the original members for a sold out, one night only, performance at the Iceberg Alley Performance Tent. However, in the wake of Hurricane Larry, the Iceberg Alley Performance had been destroyed by the winds. The after the cancelation of the April Wine show on September 13, the rest of the festival was moved to the Mile One Centre. The Irish Descendants then played their sold-out show along with The Masterless Men and The Navigators. They would play a second reunion show on 14 August, 2022 at the Churchill Park Music Festival with support from Bud Davidge of Simani, The Celtic Connection, The Kubasonics, The Masterless Men, and Carolina East.

== Member history ==
The members of the Irish Descendants have changed repeatedly over the years, both in number and in name. Founding member Con O'Brien has been the only original member of the group since 1990. The group has occasionally recorded and toured with guest musicians and alumni; most recently, Larry Foley, Patrick Moran, Billy Sutton, Sandy Morris, Ron Hynes, Jamie Snider, Alan Doyle, Rowan Sherlock, Aaron Collis, and Kelly Russell joined the group at various times in 2009.

1990 - 1994	D'Arcy Broderick - fiddle, banjo, bouzouki, guitar, vocals; Larry Martin - bass, vocals; Con O'Brien - guitar, vocals; Ronnie Power - guitar, tin whistle, banjo, bouzouki, vocals
1994 - 1996	D'Arcy Broderick - fiddle, banjo, bouzouki, guitar, accordion, mandola, vocals; Gerard Broderick - drums, bodhran; Larry Martin - bass, vocals; Con O'Brien - guitar, vocals; Kathy Phippard - keyboards, flute, vocals; Ronnie Power - guitar, tin whistle, banjo, bouzouki, vocals
1996	D'Arcy Broderick - fiddle, banjo, bouzouki, guitar, accordion, mandola, vocals; Gerard Broderick - drums, bodhran, vocals; Larry Martin - bass, vocals; Con O'Brien - guitar, vocals; Ronnie Power - guitar, tin whistle, banjo, bouzouki, vocals
1997 - 1998	Larry Martin - bass, vocals; Con O'Brien - guitar, vocals; Ronnie Power - guitar, tin whistle, banjo, bouzouki, vocals; Gerard Broderick - drums, bodhran; Eamonn O'Rourke - fiddle, guitar, banjo, bouzouki, vocals
1998 - 2000	Larry Martin - bass, vocals; Con O'Brien - guitar, vocals; Ronnie Power - guitar, tin whistle, banjo, bouzouki, vocals; Kelly Russell - fiddle, bouzouki, vocals; Paul "Boomer" Stamp - drums, percussion
2000 - 2003	Con O'Brien - guitar, vocals; Michael Hanrahan - guitar, bouzouki, banjo, mandolin, vocals; Byron Pardy - bass, vocals; Kelly Russell - fiddle, bouzouki, vocals; Paul "Boomer" Stamp - drums, percussion
2003 - 2004	Con O'Brien - guitar, vocals; Michael Hanrahan - guitar, bouzouki, banjo, mandolin, vocals; Glenn Hiscock - fiddle, mandolin, banjo, vocals; Paul Hiscock - bass, vocals; Paul "Boomer" Stamp - drums, percussion; Graham Wells - accordion, tin whistle, bodhran, vocals
2004 - 2007	Con O'Brien - guitar, vocals; Michael Hanrahan - guitar, bouzouki, banjo, mandolin, vocals; Glenn Hiscock - fiddle, mandolin, banjo, vocals; Paul Hiscock - bass, vocals; Graham Wells - accordion, tin whistle, bodhran, vocals

2007 - 2009	Con O'Brien - guitar, vocals; Glenn Hiscock - fiddle, mandolin, banjo, vocals; Paul Hiscock - bass, vocals; Graham Wells - accordion, tin whistle, bodhran, vocals
2009 - 2010	Con O'Brien - guitar, vocals; Duncan Cameron - fiddle, bouzouki, whistle, bodhran, vocals; Robert Kelly - bass, vocals; Graham Wells - accordion, tin whistle, bodhran, vocals
2010–2011	Con O'Brien - guitar, vocals; Duncan Cameron - fiddle, bouzouki, whistle, bodhran, vocals; Robert Kelly - bass, vocals; Dave Panting - banjo, mandolin, mandola, vocals
2011-2013	Con O'Brien - guitar, vocals; Robert Kelly - bass, vocals; Dave Panting - banjo, bouzouki, mandolin, mandola, vocals; Patrick Moran - fiddle, vocals
2013-2015	Con O'Brien - guitar, vocals; Ronnie Power - bouzouki, vocals; Patrick Moran - fiddle, vocals; Robert Kelly - bass, vocals
2015–2018	Con O'Brien - guitar, vocals; Ronnie Power - bouzouki, vocals; Patrick Moran - fiddle, vocals; Justin Hickey - bass, vocals
2018–2022	Con O'Brien - guitar, vocals; Patrick Moran - fiddle, vocals; Justin Hickey - bass, vocals
2022–2024	Con O'Brien - guitar, vocals; Justin Hickey - bass, vocals; Rowan Sherlock - fiddle; Terri Lynn Humber - tin whistle, piano, vocals
2024–present	Con O'Brien - guitar, vocals; Rowan Sherlock - fiddle, mandolin, piano, vocals; Madeline Carter - fiddle, vocals; Jeff Kinsman - bass, vocals

== Discography ==
=== Albums ===
Year	Album	Peak chart positions		Certifications
Year	Album	CAN	CAN Country	Certifications
1991	Misty Morning Shore			
1993	Look to the Sea			Gold
1994	Gypsies and Lovers	45	22	Gold
1996	Livin' on the Edge	66		
1998	Rollin' Home			
2001	Night at the Pub			
2001	Blooming Bright Star			
2001	The Gift			
2004	We Are the Irish Descendants			
2004	Across the Water			
2007	Southern Shore			
2018	Is Your Rhubarb Up			
2023	An Irish Descendants Christmas			
2025	Those Were The Days			

=== Compilations ===
Year	Album
1999	So Far, So Good - The Best Of The Irish Descendants
2009	Encore - Best Of The Irish Descendants Volume 2
2011	Rise Again - Volume 1 (Includes new recordings)
2024	35x35

=== Singles ===
Year	Single	Chart Positions		Album
Year	Single	CAN AC	CAN Country	Album
1993	"Last of the Great Whales"	31		Look to the Sea
1995	"Catch the Wind"	19		Gypsies and Lovers
1996	"The Rock and a Hard Place"		64	Livin' on the Edge
1999	"Catch the Wind" (re-release)	67		So Far So Good
