= If You Leave... =

Studio album by Eleanor McEvoy
- Released: 8 March 2013
- Genre: Rock / folk rock
- Label: Moscodisc
- Producer: Mick O'Gorman, Eleanor McEvoy

Eleanor McEvoy chronology
Alone (2011)	If You Leave... (2013)

If You Leave... is Eleanor McEvoy's tenth studio album. It features eight new songs and four interpretations including God Only Knows, True Colors, and Lift the Wings from Riverdance. Recorded live in the studio with some of Ireland’s finest players this album of soulful performances shows McEvoy in a bluesier neo-retro style. The overall feel is retro. Said McEvoy, "I'd been listening to a lot of 60s albums, Stones, Beatles, Beach Boys stuff like that and it was with the spirit of those albums in my musical soul that I entered the studio."

On 18 March 2013 If You Leave... was named Album of the Week by RTÉ Radio 1.

For the recording sessions, McEvoy recruited the talents of Grammy award-winning songwriter Jimmy Smyth on guitar, keyboard player James Delaney, bassists Paul Moore, Eoghan O’Neill, and drummer Des Lacey, with special guests Brian Connor on piano and David Agnew on oboe.

== Critical reception ==
RTÉ Radio 1 wrote "Her performances are intimate, emotional, uplifting affairs in which she explores soul, love and humour, using own compositions and interpretations from other songbooks, with her unique voice and beautiful playing."

Irish Music Magazine said "From the initial song creation, to the musical arrangement, to the delivery, Eleanor has a flair for every aspect of musicianship and it speaks volumes on If You Leave..."

Hot Press stated "If You Leave, her tenth solo album, is replete with accessible, often quirky melodies, intelligent lyrics and features a stellar, full-band backing with lush, analog production... If You Leave is a very fine record."

Pete Whalley from Get Ready To Rock reviewed "I'd be happy to listen to Eleanor McEvoy sing the telephone directory – her soft lilting brogue is simply that addictive. The vocals and audiophile quality throughout never falls short of the exacting standards that Eleanor has contrived to set since she broke free of record company chains and went ‘DIY’ with ‘Yola’ almost 10 years ago."

== Track listings ==
No.	Title	Writer(s)	Length
1.	"Land In The Water"	D. Rotheray, N. Johnson, E. McEvoy	3:31
2.	"Don't Blame The Tune"	E. McEvoy	4:16
3.	"God Only Knows"	B. Wilson, T. Asher	2:34
4.	"Listen To Me"	E. McEvoy	4:02
5.	"Ache In My Heart"	E. McEvoy	3:25
6.	"Heaven Help Us"	E. McEvoy	3:26
7.	"If You Leave"	E. McEvoy	3:25
8.	"Lift The Wings"	B. Whelan	4:10
9.	"Secret Of Living"	E. McEvoy	3:00
10.	"I Wish You The Best"	E. McEvoy	4:09
11.	"True Colors"	B. Steinberg, T. Kelly	3:02
12.	"Dust My Broom"	E. James, R. Johnson	3:17
