= Yola (album) =

Studio album by Eleanor McEvoy
- Released: 2001
- Genre: Rock / folk rock
- Label: Mosco Disc
- Producer: Eleanor McEvoy, Brian Connor

Eleanor McEvoy chronology
Snapshots (1999)	Yola (2001)	Early Hours (2004)

Yola is Eleanor McEvoy's fourth studio album, and her first album on her own label, Moscodisc. Yola proved to be a turning point in McEvoy's musical direction. Stripped-back, acoustic tracks reflect McEvoy's new approach to recording and performing. McEvoy produced Yola with pianist Brian Connor.

== Critical reception ==
Colin Harper described the album in Mojo in 2002, "...the glorious simplicity of this release feels like a homecoming in every sense. Backed by three superb musicians, the live-in-home-studio performances are beautifully restrained, and the vibe of both writing and sound has a warmth and contentedness redolent of gazing through rain-lashed stone-cottage windows in Wexford - which is, as it happens, pretty much how it was. (pg. 101) In its review, Allmusic suggests that McEvoy's range as a lyric-writer is limited, stating that she "seems to write about only two subjects, lost love and found love, and she tends to rely on well-worn clichés" but notes that her "melodies are easily strong enough to stand on their own", stating overall that "[t]he purity of the arrangements" of the music on this album "is indeed wonderful."

== Track listing ==
All tracks are written by Eleanor McEvoy, except where noted.

No.	Title	Writer(s)	Length
1.	"I've Got You To See Me Through"		4:30
2.	"Isn't It A Little Late"		2:26
3.	"Did I Hurt You?"		4:41
4.	"Seasoned Love"		2:37
5.	"The Rain Falls"		4:47
6.	"Dreaming Of Leaving"		3:40
7.	"Easy In Love"	Brad Parker, Eleanor McEvoy	4:31
8.	"Last Seen October 9th"		4:37
9.	"Leaves Me Wondering"		4:40
10.	"I Hear You Breathing In"		4:38
11.	"Something So Wonderful"	Eleanor McEvoy, Henry Priestman	5:29

== Singles ==
- Did I Hurt You/Isn't It A Little Late (MSM SACD114)

This double A-side single was the world's first single to be released on the on Super Audio Compact Disc SACD format.

== Super Audio ==
Yola was released in Super Audio Compact Disc format in February 2002 by Market Square Records.

== Vinyl ==
Yola was released on vinyl in 2001 by Market Square Records and re-released in 2002 by Vivante.

== Cover ==
The cover features a shot of Bridgetown railway station, at the time still open but closed in 2010. McEvoy took out ads protesting against the closure of the railway line in Wexford newspapers in 2010.

== Awards ==
In 2002 Yola was named "Record of the Year" by Hi-Fi+ Magazine
