= Wonderful Grand Band =

The Wonderful Grand Band
- Origin: St. John's, Newfoundland and Labrador, Canada
- Genres: Rock; Folk Rock
- Years active: 1978–1983 (Reunion 1997) 2009–present
- Label: Grand East Records

The Wonderful Grand Band is a Canadian music and comedy group formed in 1978 in St. John's, Newfoundland and Labrador.

== History ==
The group was founded in 1978, and included comedians Greg Malone and Tommy Sexton. They released their first album, The Wonderful Grand Band, in 1979.

The group had an eponymous television musical variety show on CBC Television. This ran for six episodes under the title The Root Seller in 1978, before relaunching in 1980 as The Wonderful Grand Band, which produced 40 more episodes between 1980 and 1983. The show starred Ron Hynes, Sandy Morris, Ian Perry, Glenn Simmons (later replaced by Steve Annan, who died in 2010), Kelly Russell (later replaced by Jamie Snider), and Rocky Wiseman (who was later replaced by Paul Stamp), as well as Malone and Sexton, who died in 1993. The show combined original and traditional music with topical comedy sketches and satire, some of which was directed at the CBC itself.

The band released a second album, Living in a Fog, in 1981.

The band reunited in 2009 for a series of concerts throughout Newfoundland and Labrador, in conjunction with the release of two DVDs containing 12 episodes of the television show. A second, one-off reunion was held in August 2012 at a Ron Hynes concert held before Hynes entered treatment for throat cancer.

On December 7, 2017, The Wonderful Grand Band released a re-recorded version of "Babylon Mall" for the 50th anniversary of the Avalon Mall, with Mark Critch from CBC's This Hour Has 22 Minutes on vocals.

== Members ==
Current Members

- Sandy Morris - acoustic & electric lead guitars, backing vocals (1978–1983, 1997, 2009–present)
- Greg Malone - comedian (1978, 1979–1983, 1997, 2009–present)
- Glenn Simmons - lead vocals, acoustic & electric guitars, bass, backing vocals (1978–1982, 1997, 2009–present)
- Jamie Snider - lead vocals, fiddle, guitars, mandolin (1980–1983, 1997, 2009–present)
- Paul "Boomer" Stamp - drums, percussion, backing vocals (1981–1982, 1982–1983, 1997, 2009–present)
- Ian Perry - bass, guitars, backing vocals (1978–1982, 1997, 2009–present)

Past Members

- Bryan Hennessey - bass, harmonica (1978) (died 2021)
- Bawnie Oulton - backing vocals (1978) (died 2010)
- Kelly Russell - fiddle, mandolin, dulcimer, backing vocals (1978–1980)
- Rocky Wiseman - drums (1978–1981) (died 2018)
- Steve Annan - guitars (1982–1983) (died 2010)
- Howie Warden - bass (1982–1983)
- Kevin McNeil - drums (1982)
- Ron Hynes – lead vocals, guitars, mandolin, banjo, backing vocals (1978–1983, 1997, 2009–2015) (died 2015)
- Tommy Sexton – vocals, comedian (1979–1983) (died 1993)
- Cathy Jones - comedian (1982–1983)
- Mary Walsh - comedian (1982–1983)

== Discography ==
See also List of songs by the Wonderful Grand Band.

- Wonderful Grand Band (1978)
- Living in a Fog (1981)
