= Glenn Simmons (musician) =

Canadian singer (born 1954)

- Born: January 26, 1954; Greens Harbour, Newfoundland, Canada
- Genres: Rock; folk; Celtic; Pop rock
- Occupations: Singer; songwriter; multi-instrumentalist; record producer; actor
- Years active: 1973–present
- Website: www.glennsimmonswebsite.com

Glenn Simmons is a Canadian singer and musician, best known as a founding member of The Wonderful Grand Band and The Fables.

== Awards ==
- 1999 - Socan Song of the Year for Tear The House Down.
- 2000 - ECMA Entertainer of the Year with the Fables.
- 2001- ECMA Album of the Year for A Time.
- 2012 - Canadian Folk Award nomination for his work with The Navigators’ Soldiers and Sailors.
- 2015 - ECMA Musician's Achievement Award

== Discography ==
The Wonderful Grand Band

- The Wonderful Grand Band - 1979
- Living in a Fog - 1981

The Fables

- Tear the House Down - 1998
- A Time - 2000
- St. John's - 2002
- Kings and Little Ones - 2007

Solo

- Sweet Vanilla - 2010

Singles

- Christmastime - 2010
