= Sharon Shannon =

Irish musician (born 1968)

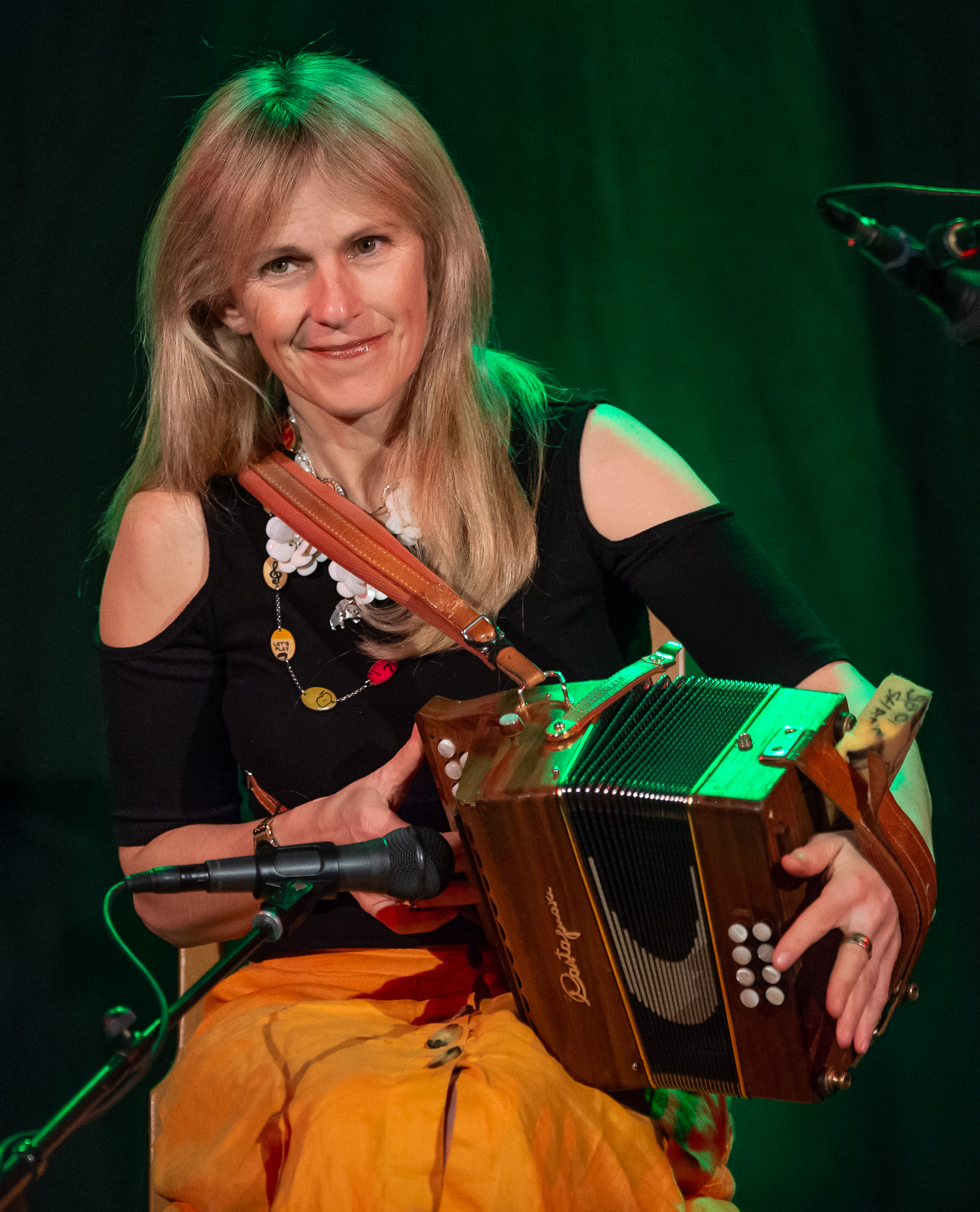
- Shannon in 2018

Background information
- Born: 8 June 1968 (age 58); Ruan, County Clare, Ireland
- Genres: Celtic, folk
- Occupation: Musician
- Instruments: Button accordion, fiddle, tin whistle, melodeon
- Years active: 1991–present
- Website: sharonshannon.com

Sharon Shannon (born 8 June 1968) is an Irish musician, best known for her work with the button accordion and for her fiddle technique. She also plays the tin whistle and melodeon. Her 1991 debut album, Sharon Shannon, was the best-selling album of traditional Irish music ever released in Ireland. Beginning with Irish folk music, her work demonstrates a wide-ranging number of musical influences. She won the lifetime achievement award at the 2009 Meteor Awards.

== Early life ==
Shannon was born in Ruan, County Clare. At eight years old, she began performing with Disirt Tola, a local band, with which she toured the United States at the age of fourteen. Shannon also worked as a competitive show jumper, but gave it up at the age of sixteen to focus on her music. She similarly abandoned studying at University College Cork.

In the mid-1980s, Shannon studied the accordion with Karen Tweed and the fiddle with Frank Custy, and performed with the band Arcady, of which she was a founding member.

== The Waterboys ==
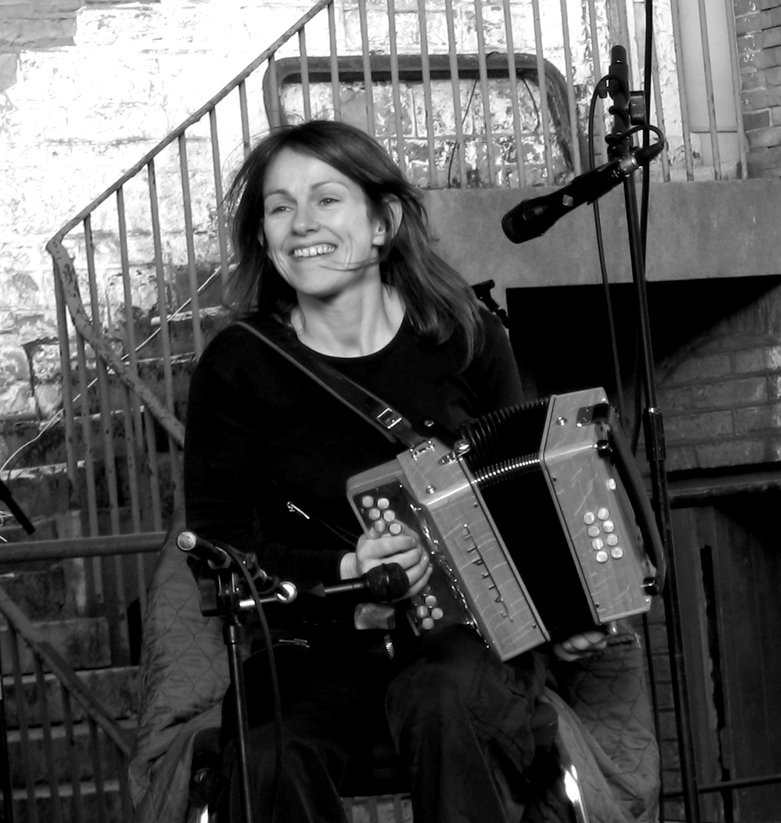
Shannon playing the accordion

Shannon began her own recording career in 1989, working with producer John Dunford and musicians such as Adam Clayton, Mike Scott and Steve Wickham. This led to Shannon joining Scott and Wickham's band, The Waterboys. She was with the band for eighteen months, and contributed both accordion and fiddle to their Room to Roam album. Her first world tour was with The Waterboys. She left the group shortly after Wickham's departure, after Scott forced The Waterboys back towards a more rock and roll sound.

== First solo recordings ==
Her 1991 debut album, Sharon Shannon, is the best-selling album of traditional Irish music ever released in Ireland.

Shannon's solo work has achieved remarkable airplay and commercial success, especially in Ireland. After her inclusion on A Woman's Heart, a compilation album and a tribute to her work on The Late Late Show, Shannon's music received a great deal of exposure, contributing to the record-breaking sales of her debut album.

Sharon's second album, Out The Gap (1994), was produced by Dennis "Blackbeard" Bovell and had a distinctly reggae feel.

Sharon's track, "Cavan Potholes", written by Dónal Lunny is featured on the 1996 compilation Common Ground: Voices of Modern Irish Music. Other stars on the album include Sinéad O'Connor, Elvis Costello, Kate Bush and Bono.

Sharon's fourth album titled Spellbound was released in September 1998. This compilation featured new material, live tracks and also tracks from previous albums. Also in 1998, she was asked by violinist Nigel Kennedy to join him in performing on his "Jimi Hendrix Suite", later performing this work in some major European cities.

Her 2000 album, The Diamond Mountain Sessions, which included vocals from a wide variety of artists, was also a commercial success, being certified triple platinum.

Shannon recorded with Steve Earle on the song "The Galway Girl", which was released on both Earle's album Transcendental Blues, and Shannon & Friends' The Diamond Mountain Sessions. Both albums were released in 2000.

Another collaboration with Earle was the instrumental "Dominic Street", released on Earle's 2002 album Sidetracks. Shannon has also worked with Jackson Browne, the band Coolfin, Dónal Lunny, Moya Brennan, Kirsty MacColl, Christy Moore, Sinéad O'Connor, Paul Brady, Liam O'Maonlai, Mundy and John Prine, amongst others.

== Later work ==
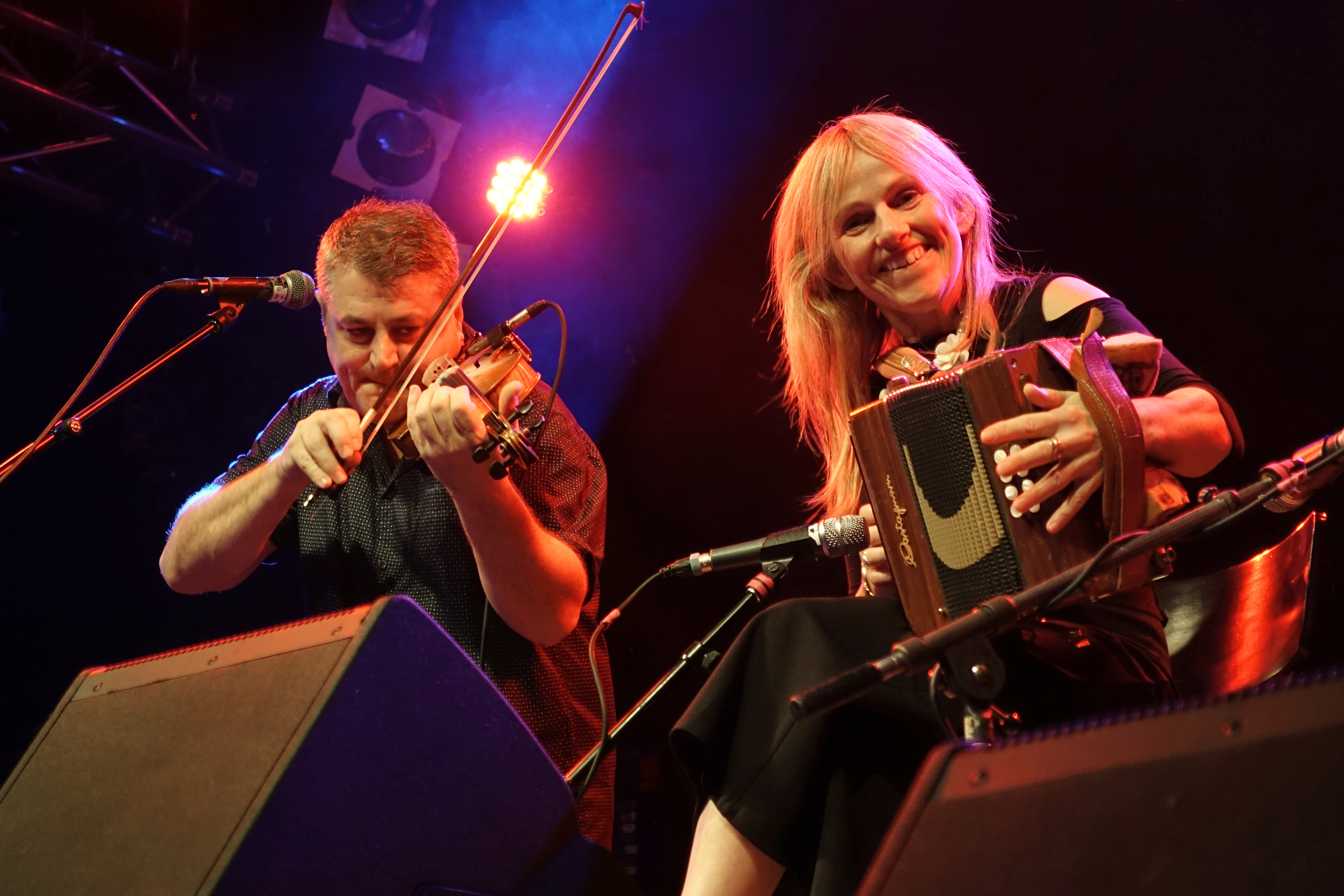
Sharon Shannon and Band, Knust, Hamburg, Germany, October 2018

As a solo musician, Sharon Shannon has toured Australia, Europe, Hong Kong, and Japan. She has also performed for politicians such as Bill Clinton, Mary Robinson and Lech Wałęsa. Shannon has played benefit concerts for causes that she supports, such as animal welfare. In 2004, Shannon released the album Libertango with guest spots from Róisín Elsafty, Sinéad O'Connor and Kirsty MacColl. In 2005, she appeared on Tunes, a collaboration with Frankie Gavin, Michael McGoldrick, and Jim Murray. Other collaborations that year included Eliza Carthy. In 2006, a celebration of 15 years of recording came out with The Sharon Shannon Collection 1990–2005. In 2007, Shannon worked with Belinda Carlisle on her album Voila.In 2008, Shannon featured in the Transatlantic Sessions.

A live version of Galway Girl recorded with Mundy was the most downloaded track in Ireland in 2007, winning a Meteor Award. In 2009, she played "Galway Girl" live at the Meteor Music Awards 2009, where she also picked up a Lifetime Achievement Award and won Most Downloaded Track again for Galway Girl with Mundy.

For several years Shannon performed numerous live collaborations, on stage and TV with Shane MacGowan, with her band performing a number of songs from the Pogues songbook, and MacGowan performing songs from Shannon's repertoire at a time when otherwise he infrequently performed live, or aired new material. Shannon twice recorded MacGowan's otherwise unreleased song Mama Lou, while he provided vocals on a cover of his song Rake at the Gates of Hell on Shannon's 2009 album Saints and Scoundrels and Fiesta on 2010s Collaborations.

Shannon features playing accordion on The Lee Thompson Ska Orchestra single "Bangarang", which also features Dawn Penn as vocalist. It was released on 26 May 2014.

Beginning with Irish folk music, her work demonstrates a wide-ranging number of musical influences, including reggae, cajun music, Portuguese music, and French Canadian music. Her single "What You Make It (da, da, da, da)" featured hip hop music artists. She continues to record her music and perform with her tour band, The Woodchoppers.

== Honours ==
In October 2018, NUI Galway awarded Shannon an honorary doctorate.

== Discography ==
=== Albums ===
- Sharon Shannon (1991)
- Out the Gap (1994)
- Each Little Thing (1997)
- Spellbound: The Best Of Sharon Shannon (1999)
- The Diamond Mountain Sessions (2000)
- Live in Galway (2002) with the Woodchoppers
- Libertango (2003)
- tunes (2005) with Frankie Gavin, Michael McGoldrick, and Jim Murray
- The Sharon Shannon Collection 1990–2005 (2006)
- Live at Dolans CD & DVD (2007)
- Renegade (2007) with Mike McGoldrick, Dezi Donnelly, and Jim Murray
- Saints & Scoundrels (2009)
- upside down (2009) with Mike McGoldrick, Dezi Donnelly, and Jim Murray
- Flying Circus (2012) with Jim Murray and the RTÉ Concert Orchestra
- The Set List US/Canada 2014 (2014)
- In Galway CD & DVD (2015) with Alan Connor
- Live in the US and Canada 2016 (2016) with Jim Murray and Alan Connor
- Sacred Earth (2017) Recorded and released on Irish record label, Celtic Collections
- Live in Minneapolis (2019)
- The Winkles Tapes 1989 (2019)
- The Reckoning (2020)

== Videography ==
- Live at Dolans (2007)
- In Galway (2015) with Alan Connor
