= Great Big Sea discography =

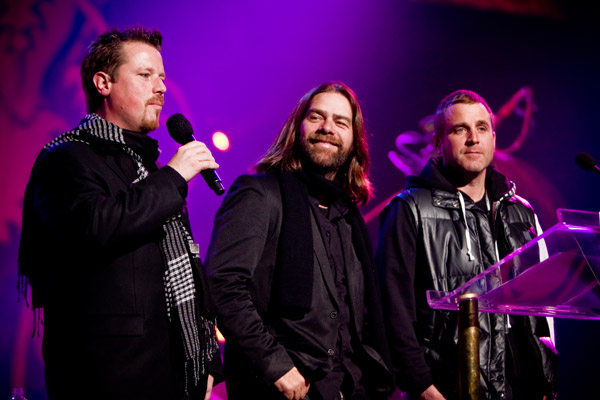
- Great Big Sea in 2009
- Studio albums: 9
- Live albums: 3
- Compilation albums: 3
- Singles: 28

Great Big Sea was a Canadian folk rock band. Their discography comprises nine studio albums, three compilation albums, three live albums and twenty-eight singles.

== Studio albums ==
Title	Details	Peak chart positions			Certifications (sales thresholds)
Title	Details	CAN	US	US Heat	Certifications (sales thresholds)
Great Big Sea	Release date: March 13, 1993; Label: NRA Productions; Format: Cassette, CD	—	—	—	CAN: Gold
Up	Release date: September 12, 1995; Label: Warner Music Canada; Format: Cassette, CD	45	—	—	CAN: 4× Platinum
Play	Release date: May 20, 1997; Label: Warner Music Canada; Format: Cassette, CD	9	—	—	CAN: 3× Platinum
Turn	Release date: June 22, 1999; Label: Warner Music Canada; Format: Cassette, CD	9	—	—	CAN: Platinum
Sea of No Cares	Release date: February 19, 2002; Label: Warner Music Canada; Format: CD	1	—	—	CAN: Platinum
Something Beautiful	Release date: February 24, 2004; Label: Warner Music Canada; Format: CD	4	—	—	CAN: Gold
The Hard and the Easy	Release date: October 11, 2005; Label: Warner Music Canada; Format: CD	3	—	—	CAN: Gold
Fortune's Favour	Release date: June 24, 2008; Label: Warner Music Canada; Format: CD, Vinyl	5	—	49	CAN: Gold
Safe Upon the Shore	Release date: July 13, 2010; Label: Warner Music Canada; Format: CD	2	159	4	CAN: Gold

== Compilations ==
Title	Details	Peak positions	Certifications (sales thresholds)
Title	Details	CAN	Certifications (sales thresholds)
Rant and Roar	Release date: June 2, 1998; Label: Sire Records; Format: Cassette, CD	—	
XX	Release date: October 30, 2012; Label: Warner Music Canada; Format: CD	11	CAN: Gold
XX (box set)	Release date: October 30, 2012; Label: Warner Music Canada; Format: CD	—	
"—" denotes releases that did not chart

== Live albums ==
Title	Details	Peak positions	Certifications (sales thresholds)
Title	Details	CAN	Certifications (sales thresholds)
Road Rage	Release date: October 31, 2000; Label: Warner Music Canada; Format: Cassette, CD	9	CAN: Gold
Great Big DVD and CD	Release date: October 12, 2004; Label: Zoë Records; Format: CD, DVD	—	
Courage & Patience & Grit	Release date: November 21, 2006; Label: Warner Music Canada; Format: CD, DVD	52	
"—" denotes releases that did not chart

== Singles ==
=== 1990s ===
Year	Single	Peak chart positions		Album
Year	Single	CAN AC	CAN	Album
1995	"Run Runaway"	—	—	Up
1996	"Fast As I Can"	46	40	Up
1996	"Mari-Mac"	—	—	Up
1996	"Goin' Up"	53	70	Up
1997	"When I'm Up (I Can't Get Down)"	13	6	Play
1997	"Ordinary Day"	3	30	Play
1998	"End of the World"	9	24	Play
1998	"Lukey"	—	—	Fire in the Kitchen
1998	"How Did We Get from Saying 'I Love You'..."	23	—	Play
1999	"Consequence Free"	7	18	Turn
1999	"Feel It Turn"	38	65	Turn
"—" denotes releases that did not chart

=== 2000s ===
Year	Single	Peak positions	Album
Year	Single	CAN	Album
2000	"Can't Stop Falling"	—	Turn
2000	"Everything Shines"	—	Road Rage
2002	"Sea of No Cares"	22	Sea of No Cares
2002	"Stumbling In"	56	Sea of No Cares
2002	"Clearest Indication"	—	Sea of No Cares
2003	"Penelope"	—	Sea of No Cares
2004	"When I Am King"	—	Something Beautiful*
2004	"Shines Right Through Me"	—	Something Beautiful*
2005	"Captain Kidd"	—	The Hard and the Easy
2006	"Come and I Will Sing You (The Twelve Apostles)"	—	The Hard and the Easy
2006	"Sea of No Cares" (live)	—	Courage & Patience & Grit
2008	"Walk on the Moon"	86	Fortune's Favour
2008	"Love Me Tonight"	—	Fortune's Favour
2009	"Here and Now"	—	Fortune's Favour
"—" denotes releases that did not chart

=== 2010s ===
Year	Single	Album
2010	"Nothing but a Song"	Safe Upon the Shore
2010	"Good People"	Safe Upon the Shore
2012	"Heart of Hearts"	XX

== DVD ==
Year	Album	CRIA
2003	Great Big DVD	3× Platinum
2006	Courage & Patience & Grit	

== Other releases ==
- 2005: Podcasts
- 2006: Podcasts
- 2007: Podcasts
