= XX (Great Big Sea album) =

Compilation album by Great Big Sea
- Released: October 30, 2012
- Recorded: 1993–2012
- Genre: Folk, folk rock, Celtic rock
- Length: 2:14:36
- Label: Warner Music Canada

Great Big Sea chronology
Safe Upon the Shore (2010)	XX (2012)

XX is a compilation by Great Big Sea to celebrate the band's 20th anniversary. It is the group's final album to date, as well as their last recording to feature Séan McCann. It was released as a two-disc CD album, and also in a Deluxe Edition which includes a third CD plus a DVD with an hour-long documentary "Meet Great Big Sea" and other goodies.

The XX Tour was a comprehensive tour which accompanied the release of this album, playing 38 shows across North America and featuring music from almost all previous Great Big Sea records. This tour began on March 5, 2013, with a show at The Grove in Anaheim, California, and concluded a few minutes after midnight on January 1, 2014, after a final New Year's Day concert at Casino New Brunswick in Moncton. Following the XX Tour, Séan McCann officially withdrew from the band.

== Disc 1 – The Pop Songs ==
=== Track listing ===
1. "Born to Believe" – 3:45 (previously unreleased)
2. "What Are You At" – 3:10 (from Great Big Sea, 1993)
3. "Run Runaway" – 2:50 (from Up, 1995)
4. "Goin' Up" – 3:11 (From Up)
5. "When I'm Up (I Can't Get Down)" – 3:23 (from Play, 1997)
6. "Ordinary Day" – 3:09 (from Play)
7. "How Did We Get From Saying 'I Love You'" – 3:47 (from Play)
8. "Consequence Free" – 3:14 (from Turn, 1999)
9. "Feel It Turn" – 3:47 (from Turn)
10. "Boston and St. John's" – 3:47 (from Turn)
11. "Sea of No Cares" – 3:41 (from Sea of No Cares, 2002)
12. "Clearest Indication" – 4:12 (from Sea of No Cares)
13. "When I Am King" – 2:31 (from Something Beautiful*, 2004)
14. "Something Beautiful" – 3:47 (from Something Beautiful*)
15. "Love Me Tonight" – 4:12 (from Fortune's Favour, 2008)
16. "Walk On The Moon" – 3:35 (from Fortune's Favour)
17. "Live This Life" – 4:39 (previously unreleased)
18. "Nothing But A Song" – 3:02 (from Safe Upon The Shore, 2010)
19. "Long Life (Where Did You Go)" – 3:11 (from Safe Upon The Shore)
20. "Let My Love Open the Door" – 4:16 (previously unreleased)

== Disc 2 – The Folk Songs ==
=== Track listing ===
1. "Heart of Hearts" – 4:09 (previously unreleased)
2. "Great Big Sea / Gone By The Board" – 3:36 (from Great Big Sea)
3. "Donkey Riding" – 2:22 (from Play)
4. "A Boat Like Gideon Brown" – 2:54 (from Sea of No Cares)
5. "Dancing With Mrs. White" – 2:06 (from Up)
6. "General Taylor" – 2:55 (from Play)
7. "Come And I Will Sing You" – 3:43 (from The Hard and the Easy, 2005)
8. "Ferryland Sealer" – 3:17 (from Turn)
9. "Lukey" – 3:23 (With The Chieftains. From Fire in the Kitchen, 1998)
10. "Captain Wedderburn" – 3:37 (From Turn)
11. "Captain Kidd" – 2:50 (from The Hard and the Easy)
12. "Le Bon Vin" – 3:08 (previously unreleased)
13. "England (Live)" – 4:45 (previously unreleased)
14. "Old Black Rum" – 2:29 (from Up)
15. "The Night Pat Murphy Died" – 3:00 (from Play)
16. "River Driver" – 3:03 (from The Hard and the Easy)
17. "Mari-Mac" – 2:33 (from Up)
18. "Excursion Around The Bay" – 2:28 (from Great Big Sea)
19. "Josephine The Baker" – 4:35 (previously unreleased)
20. "Good People" – 2:34 (from Safe Upon The Shore)

== Disc 3 – Rogue Waves (only with Deluxe Box Set) ==
=== Track listing ===
1. "Republican Song" – 3:18
2. "Get in the Van" – 2:35
3. "Countryside" – 3:15
4. "Father's Eye" – 3:33
5. "Little Beggarman" – 5:18
6. "Long Life (Where Did You Go?)" – 2:57
7. "You Only Get So Many Summers" – 3:25
8. "Widow in the Window" – 4:18
9. "The Ladder" – 3:45
10. "Something Beautiful" – 3:39
11. "Rough Atlantic Sea" – 2:27
12. "Six Months in a Leaky Boat" – 3:04
13. "Silver Linings" – 3:29
14. "Say You Will" – 3:32
15. "Nothing But a Song" – 3:41
16. "Play the Game" – 1:51
17. "I Don't Feel Like Losing" – 2:48
18. "Here Comes My Baby" – 2:59
19. "Clearest Indication" – 3:31
20. "Parade" – 4:31

== Chart performance ==
Chart (2012)	Peak position
Canadian Albums Chart	11

== Certifications ==
Region	Certification
Canada (Music Canada)	Gold
