= Road Rage (Great Big Sea album) =

Live album by Great Big Sea
- Released: October 31, 2000 (Canada)
- Recorded: October 14, 1999 – May 26, 2000
- Genre: Folk
- Length: 1:07:37
- Label: Warner Music Canada

Great Big Sea chronology
Turn (1999)	Road Rage (2000)	Sea of No Cares (2002)

Professional ratings
Review scores
Source	Rating
Allmusic	link

Road Rage is an album by Great Big Sea released in 2000. It is a compilation of live performances that took place between October 14 and December 31, 1999.

== Track listing ==
1. "Donkey Riding" (Traditional) 2:18
2. "When I'm Up (I Can't Get Down)" (Ian Telfer, Alan Prosser, John Jones) 3:53
3. "Everything Shines" (Chris Trapper) 2:40
4. "Goin Up" (Alan Doyle) 4:55
5. "Boston and St. John's" (Alan Doyle) 4:36
6. "The Night Pat Murphy Died" (Traditional) 3:36
7. "Consequence Free" (Alan Doyle, Séan McCann, Bob Hallett, Darrell Power) 3:07
8. "Captain Wedderburn" (Traditional) 3:51
9. "The Old Black Rum" (Bob Hallett) 3:31
10. "General Taylor" (Arranged By Alan Doyle, Séan McCann, Bob Hallett, Darrell Power) 3:41
11. "Lukey" (Arranged By Alan Doyle, Séan McCann, Bob Hallett, Darrell Power) 4:32
12. "Feel It Turn" (Séan McCann) 4:14
13. "I'm A Rover" (Traditional) 3:18
14. "Fast As I Can" (Alan Doyle) 3:53
15. "Jack Hinks" (Traditional) 3:20
16. "Mari-Mac" (Arranged By Alan Doyle, Séan McCann, Bob Hallett, Darrell Power) 3:19
17. "Ordinary Day" (Alan Doyle, Séan McCann) 3:38
18. "Excursion Around The Bay" (Johnny Burke) 2:35
19. "Hangin Johnny" (Alan Doyle, Séan McCann, Bob Hallett, Darrell Power) 2:55

On December 31, 1999, Great Big Sea set a Newfoundland record for largest single gathering, with over 90,000 people in attendance at the waterfront of St. Johns, as the last night of both the millennium and the tour.
