= Gavin Brown (musician) =

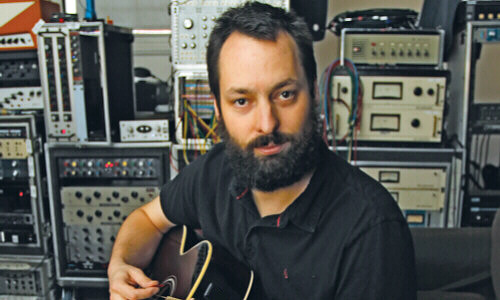

Background information
- Born: Toronto, Ontario
- Origin: Canada
- Occupations: Record producer; songwriter; musician

Gavin Brown is a Canadian record producer and drummer, most noted as a winner of the Jack Richardson Producer of the Year award at the Juno Awards of 2004 for his work on Billy Talent's "Try Honesty" and Three Days Grace's "I Hate Everything About You".

Born and raised in Toronto, Ontario, he originally pursued training as a classical pianist before expanding into playing guitar, bass and drums.

He began his career in the mid-1990s as a member of the band Phleg Camp, and later played drums in Big Sugar, as well as working as a session and touring musician with Crash Vegas, Skydiggers, Jim Cuddy, Danko Jones, and The Mahones.

In addition to his Juno Award win, he was a nominee on three other occasions, having been nominated at the Juno Awards of 2011 for his work on Sarah Harmer's "Captive" and "New Loneliness", the Juno Awards of 2013 for The Tragically Hip's "At Transformation" and "About This Map", and at the Juno Awards of 2015 for Three Days Grace's "I Am Machine" and Mother Mother's "Reaper Man".

In 2018, Brown and Maïa Davies also launched the artist management agency Inside Pocket Music.

== Discography ==
Year	Artist	Album	Role
2015	Barenaked Ladies	Silverball: Released: June 2, 2015; Label: Vanguard Records; Format: LP, CD, Digital	Producer Mixing
2015	Three Days Grace	Human: Released: March 31, 2015; Label: RCA Records; Format: LP, CD, Digital	Producer Songwriter: Human Race; Painkiller; Fallen Angel; Landmine; Tell Me Why; I Am Machine; So What; Car Crash; Nothing's Fair in Love and War; One Too Many; The End is Not the Answer; The Real You
2015	North of Nine	North of Nine - EP: Released: March 10, 2015; Label: 9th Portal Entertainment; Format: CD, Digital	Producer Songwriter: Can it be you?; Better off Together; Open Road; Alone; Eaten Alive
2014	Mother Mother	Very Good Bad Thing: Released: November 4, 2014; Label: Universal Music; Format: LP, CD, Digital	Producer
2014	Doc Walker	The 8th: Released: October 21, 2014; Label: Westlake Music Inc.; Format: CD, Digital	Producer Songwriter: Park The Car; Leave it all on the Dance Floor
2014	Billy Talent	Hits: Released: November 4, 2014; Label: Warner Music Canada; Format: LP, CD, Digital	Producer
2014	Flash Lightnin	For The Sinners: Released: April 29, 2014; Label: Pheromone Records; Format: LP, CD, Digital	Producer Musician: Drums
2014	The Trews	The Trews: Released: April 22, 2014; Label: Universal Canada; Format: LP, CD, Digital	Producer Songwriter: What's Fair Is Fair
2013	Royal Teeth	Glow: Released: August 13, 2013; Label: Dangerbird Records; Format: LP, CD, Vinyl, Digital	Producer
2013	Barenaked Ladies	Grinning Streak: Released: June 11, 2013; Label: Vanguard Records; Format: LP, CD, Digital	Producer Mixing
2013	The Brilliancy	The Brilliancy EP: Released: 2013; Label: The Brilliancy Inc.; Format: Digital	Producer
2013	Gentlemen Husbands	House of Cards EP: Released: 2013; Label: Universal; Format: CD, Digital	Songwriter: Shelter Valley; Come Down; Bloodlines; Wandering Eye
2013	The Envy	The Envy: Released: 2013; Label: The Envy Music; Format: Digital	Songwriter: Fingers Crossed; Still The One
2013	Open Air Stereo	Primates: Released: 2013; Label: Goomba Music; Format: CD	Producer
2013	Orianthi	Heaven in This Hell: Released: February 26, 2013; Label: Robo Records; Format: CD, Digital	Songwriter: Heaven in This Hell
2013	Whosarmy	Hole In My Heart: Released: 2013; Label: Released Independently; Format: CD	Songwriter: Hole in My Heart; Glory Bound; So Lonely; Can't Live Without You; The World is Ending
2012	The Brilliancy	With You & Better Than Me (Singles): Released: 2012; Label: The Brilliancy Inc.; Format: Digital	Producer
2012	Hess	Living in Yesterday: Released: 2012; Label: Frontiers Records; Format: LP, CD, Digital	Songwriter: Don't Leave Me
2012	Hey Ocean!	Is: Released: 2012; Label: Universal Music Canada / Nettwerk; Format: CD, Digital	Musician: Drums
2012	The Envy	Deception: Released:2012; Label: The Envy Music; Format: Digital	Songwriter: Unfaithful
2012	Hoobastank	Fight or Flight: Released: September 11, 2012; Label: Open E Entertainment (Now Universal); Format: CD, Digital	Producer
2012	Lit	The View from the Bottom: Released: June 19, 2012; Label: Megaforce Records; Format: CD	Songwriter: C'mon
2012	Metric	Synthetica: Released: June 12, 2012; Label: Metric Music International / Mom + Pop Records; Format: LP, CD, Digital	Producer
2012	The Tragically Hip	Now for Plan A: Released: October 2, 2012; Label: Universal Music Canada; Format: LP, CD, Digital	Producer
2011	Dan Hill	Intimate Dan Hill: Platinum Collection: Released: 2011; Label: Universal Music; Format: CD	Producer
2010	Howard Shore	The Twilight Saga: Eclipse - The Score: Released: June 29, 2010; Label: E1 Music; Format: LP, CD, Digital	Producer
2010	Melissa Auf der Maur	Out of Our Minds: Released: April 6, 2010; Label: Roadrunner Records; Format: LP, CD, Digital	Musician: Wurlitzer
2010	Various Artists	The Twilight Saga: Eclipse (soundtrack): Released: June 8, 2010; Label: Atlantic / Chop Shop; Format: LP, CD, Digital	Producer: Eclipse (All Yours) - Metric
2010	My Darkest Days	My Darkest Days: Released: September 21, 2010; Label: 604 Records; Format: LP, CD, Digital	Songwriter: Can't Forget You
2010	Sarah Harmer	Oh Little Fire: Released: June 22, 2010; Label: Cold Snap Records; Format: LP, CD, Digital	Producer Musician: Drums; Guitar; Mellotron; Piano; Tambourine; Wurlitzer; Engineer
2010	Stereos	Uncontrollable: Released: December 14, 2010; Label: Interscope; Format: CD, Digital	Producer
2009	Danko Jones	This Is Danko Jones: Released: April 14, 2009; Label: EMD International; Format: LP, CD, Digital	Musician: Drums
2009	Lady Gaga	Don't Give Up (Single) with The Midway State: Released: Unreleased; Label: Unreleased; Format: Unreleased	Producer
2009	New Kids on the Block	2 in the Morning (Remix): Released: February 23, 2009; Label: Interscope; Format: CD	Producer
2009	Metric	Fantasies: Released: April 14, 2009; Label: Metric Music International / Mom + Pop Records; Format: LP, CD, Digital	Producer
2009	Skillet	Awake: Released: August 25, 2009; Label: Atlantic Records; Format: CD	Songwriter: Monster
2009	Stereos	Stereos: Released: October 20, 2009; Label: Universal Music; Format: CD	Producer Musician; Arranger; Engineer
2009	Theo Tams	Give It All Away: Released: 2009; Label: Sony BMG; Format: CD	Producer
2008	Various Artists	YTV Presents: The Next Star EP: Released: 2008; Label: Tricon Films & Television; Format: Digital	Songwriter: The Last Word - Briar Gillis
2007	The Midway State	Met a Man on Top of the Hill EP: Released: May 1, 2007; Label: Format: LP, CD, Digital	Producer Songwriter: Nobody Understands
2007	The Reason	Things Couldn't Be Better: Released: March 20, 2007; Label: Smallman Records; Format: CD	Producer Musician: Percussion; Wurlitzer
2007	Rides Again	Into Existence: Released: October 8, 2007; Label: Put It On / Last Gang Records; Format: CD, Digital	Producer
2007	Simon Wilcox	Charm and the Strange: Released: May 29, 2007; Label: Maple Nationwide; Format: CD, Digital	Musician: Electric Guitar; Acoustic Guitar
2007	Joel Kroeker	Melodrama: Released: January 1, 2007; Label: True North Records; Format: CD, Digital	Musician: Drums
2006	Billy Talent	Billy Talent II: Released: June 27, 2006; Label: Atlantic Records; Format: LP, CD, Digital	Producer
2006	Cancer Bats	Birthing the Giant: Released: September 5, 2006; Label: Distort Entertainment; Format: LP, CD, Digital	Producer
2006	Dayna Manning	Folkyo: Released: October 25, 2006; Label: Leparc; Format: CD	Musician: Drums
2006	Jim Cuddy	The Light That Guides You Home: Released: September 18, 2006; Label: Warner Canada; Format: CD	Musician: Drums
2006	The Sadies	In Concert, Vol. 1: Released: 2006; Label: Yep Roc Records; Format: LP, CD, Digital	Musician: Drums
2006	Suzi Rawn	Naked: Released: September 26, 2006; Label: Vespa Music; Format: LP, CD, Digital	Songwriter: Don't Leave Me
2006	Various Artists	WWE: Wreckless Intent: Released: May 23, 2006; Label: Columbia Records; Format: CD	Producer, Mixing: Deadly Game - Theory of a Deadman
2005	Kalan Porter	219 Days: Released: January 11, 2005; Label: BMG; Format: CD	Musician: Drums
2004	Sarah Harmer	All of Our Names: Released: March 23, 2004; Label: Coldsnap Records; Format: CD, Digital	Producer Musician: Drums; Guitar; Wurlitzer; Mixing
2004	Sarah Slean	Day One: Released: October 26, 2004; Label: Warner Bros.; Format: LP, CD, Digital	Musician: Drums
2004	The Tea Party	Seven Circles: Released: August 24, 2004; Label: EMI; Format: LP, CD, Digital	Producer
2004	Thornley	Come Again: Released: May 11, 2004; Label: Roadrunner Records; Format: CD	Producer Songwriter: Falling to Pieces; Come Again; So Far So Good; The Going Rate (My Fix); Keep A Good Man Down; Clever; Found Another Way
2004	Various Artists	World Cup of Hockey 2004: Released: June 29, 2004; Label: Universal International; Format: LP, CD, Digital	Songwriter: Falling to Pieces - Thornley
2003	Billy Talent	Billy Talent: Released: September 16, 2003; Label: Atlantic Records; Format: CD, Digital	Producer
2003	Three Days Grace	Three Days Grace: Released: July 22, 2003; Label: Jive Records; Format: CD	Producer Songwriter: Burn; Just Like You; I Hate Everything About You; Home; Scared; Let You Down; Now or Never; Born Like This; Drown; Wake Up; Take Me Under; Overrated
2003	Alexandra Slate	Edge of a Girl: Released: 2003; Label: Hollywood Records; Format: CD	Producer Songwriter: Bad Girl
2003	Beth Boucher	Mess You Up: Released: January 14, 2003; Label: Virt Records; Format: LP, CD, Digital	Musician: Bass; Bottle; Drums; Guitar; Organ
2003	Big Sugar	Hit & Run: Released: December 30, 2003; Label: Universal International; Format: LP, CD	Songwriter: Better Get Used to It; Musician: Drums
2003	Crush	Face in the Crowd: Released: 2003; Label: Factor; Format: CD	Producer Musician: Bass; Drums; Percussion; Wurlitzer
2003	Great Big Sea	Great Big DVD: Released: Label: Format: LP, CD, Digital	
2003	Harry Hess	Just Another Day: Released: June 26, 2003; Label: Frontiers Records; Format: LP, CD, Digital	Musician: Drums
2003	Jason Collett	Motor Motel Love Songs: Released: May 20, 2003; Label: Arts & Crafts Productions; Format: CD	Musician: Drums
2003	Kevin Hearn	Night Light: Released: 2003; Label: Hybrid Recordings; Format: CD	Musician: Percussion
2003	Ryan Malcolm	Home: Released: December 3, 2003; Label: BMG; Format: CD	Producer Songwriter: Straight Up the Middle; Absolutely Perfect
2002	Great Big Sea	Sea of No Cares: Released: February 26, 2002; Label: Rounder Records; Format: CD	Musician: Drums
2000	Great Big Sea	Road Rage: Released: October 31, 2000; Label: Universal Canada; Format: CD, Digital	Musician: Drums
1999	Big Sugar	Heated: Released: April 6, 1999; Label: Capricorn Records; Format: Cassette, CD, Digital	Songwriter: Better Get Used to It; Musician: Drums
1998	Hayden	The Closer I Get: Released: May 12, 1998; Label: Interscope; Format: CD, Digital	Musician: Drums
1997	Skydiggers	Desmond's Hip City: Released: 1997; Label: DROG Records; Format: CD	Musician: Drums
1997	Stem	Amusingly Short of Details: Released: 1997; Label: Factor; Format: CD	Musician: Drums
1996	Mia Sheard	With Love and Squalor: Released: 1996; Label: Unknown; Format: LP, CD, Digital	Musician: Drums
1995	Spookey Ruben	Modes of Transportation Vol. 1: Released: October 3, 1995; Label: TVT Records; Format: Cassette, CD	Musician: Drums
1993	Phleg Camp	Ya'red Fair Scratch: Released: 1993; Label: Cargo; Format: Cassette, CD	Musician: Vocals
