= Courage & Patience & Grit =

Box set by Great Big Sea
- Released: November 14, 2006
- Genre: Folk

Professional ratings
Review scores
Source	Rating
Allmusic	3.5/5 stars

Courage & Patience & Grit is a DVD/CD set released by the band Great Big Sea on November 14, 2006. It contains video of the live performance from a concert at the Empire Theatre in Belleville, Ontario along with music videos for the songs "Captain Kidd", "When I Am King", "Lukey", and "Shines Right Through Me". The live performance was recorded during their The Hard and the Easy tour.

The name of the album comes from a line in the song "Tickle Cove Pond" ("It's only by courage and patience and grit"), a song on The Hard and the Easy, which provides the name for that album but which does not appear on this DVD.

== Track listing ==
1. "Captain Kidd" (Traditional, Arranged Alan Doyle, Séan McCann, Bob Hallett) – 2:56
2. "Jack Hinks" (Traditional) – 4:08
3. "Sweet Forget Me Not (Graceful and Charming)"(Bobby Newcome, Arranged Alan Doyle, Séan McCann, Bob Hallett) – 3:24
4. "Billy Peddle" – (Traditional) 4:34
5. "Concerning Charlie Horse" (Omar Blondahl) – 3:40
6. * "I’m A Rover" (Traditional) 3:32
7. "A Boat Like Gideon Brown" (Traditional, Arranged Alan Doyle, Séan McCann, Bob Hallett, Darrell Power) – 3:20
8. "The Mermaid" (Shel Silverstein, Arranged Alan Doyle, Séan McCann, Bob Hallett) – 3:59
9. "The River Driver" (Traditional, Arranged Alan Doyle, Séan McCann, Bob Hallett) – 3:20
10. "Scolding Wife" (Traditional Arranged by Alan Doyle, Séan McCann, Bob Hallett, Darrell Power) – 3:59
11. "Old Polina" (Traditional, Arranged Alan Doyle, Séan McCann, Bob Hallett) – 2:34
12. "Shines Right Through Me" (Alan Doyle, Kalem Mahoney, Séan McCann) – 3:17
13. "When I’m Up" (Ian Telfer, Alan Prosser, John Jones) – 4:19
14. "The Night Pat Murphy Died" (Johnny Burke) – 3:37
15. "When I Am King" (Alan Doyle) – 2:48
16. * "Danny Boy" (Traditional) 3:01
17. * "Run Runaway" (Noddy Holder, Jim Lea) 3:30
18. "General Taylor" (Arranged by Alan Doyle, Séan McCann, Bob Hallett, Darrell Power) – 3:33
19. "Sea Of No Cares" (Alan Doyle, Séan McCann, Chris Trapper) – 4:15
20. "Helmet Head" (Bob Hallett) – 3:00
21. "Consequence Free" (Alan Doyle, Séan McCann, Bob Hallett, Darrell Power) – 3:23
22. "Mari-Mac" (Arranged by Alan Doyle, Séan McCann, Bob Hallett, Darrell Power) – 3:25
23. "Ordinary Day" (Alan Doyle, Séan McCann) – 4:40
24. "Excursion Around The Bay" (Johnny Burke) – 2:41
25. "Fortune Set" (Arranged by Alan Doyle, Séan McCann, Bob Hallett, Darrell Power) – 3:15
26. * "Old Brown’s Daughter" (Traditional) 2:48
- Tracks marked with an asterisk not available on the audio CD.

== Personnel ==
- Eric Beausejour – Design
- Chris Butler – Photography
- Yves Dion – Editing
- Alan Doyle – Guitar (Acoustic), Bouzouki, Guitar (Electric), Liner Notes
- Murray Foster – Bass, Vocals
- Bob Hallett – Fiddle, Liner Notes, Tin Whistle, Button Accordion, Tenor Banjo
- François Lamoureux – Liner Notes, Mixing
- Pierre Lamoureux – Director, Liner Notes
- Kris MacFarlane – Guitar (Acoustic), Percussion, Drums, Vocals, Piano-Accordion
- Andrew MacNaughtan – Photography
- Séan McCann – Guitar (Acoustic), Vocals, Liner Notes, Bodhran, Shaker, Tin Whistle
- John McCullagh – Scratching
- Denis Normandeau – Mixing
