= Rant and Roar =

Compilation album by Great Big Sea
- Released: June 2, 1998
- Genre: Folk
- Length: 40:43
- Label: Warner Music Canada
- Producer: Danny Greenspoon

Great Big Sea chronology
| Play (1997) | Rant and Roar (1998) | Turn (1999) |

Professional ratings
Review scores
| Source | Rating |
|---|---|
| Allmusic | 4.5/5 stars |

Rant and Roar is an album by Great Big Sea. Released in 1998 only to the USA, it is a compilation of some of the tracks from Up and Play also by Great Big Sea. This album was created because the band wanted to expand beyond their mostly Canadian fan base. The album's title comes from the first line of the traditional song "The Ryans and the Pittmans", which is generally more well known than the song's actual name.

== Track listing ==
1. "Ordinary Day" (Alan Doyle, Séan McCann) 3:09
2. "When I'm Up" (Ian Telfer, Alan Prosser, John Jones) 3:24
3. "Mari-Mac" (Arranged By Alan Doyle, Séan McCann, Bob Hallett, Darrell Power) 2:33
4. "End of the World" (Bill Berry, Peter Buck, Mike Mills, Michael Stipe) 2:42
5. "Fast As I Can" (Alan Doyle) 4:11
6. "The Night Pat Murphy Died" (Traditional)
7. "Goin Up" (Alan Doyle) 3:12
8. "General Taylor" (Arranged By Alan Doyle, Séan McCann, Bob Hallett, Darrell Power) 2:53
9. "Dancing With Mrs.White" (Traditional) 2:07
10. "Something To It" (Séan McCann) 2:21
11. "Lukey" (Arranged By Alan Doyle, Séan McCann, Bob Hallett, Darrell Power) 3:10
12. "The Old Black Rum" (Bob Hallett) 2:29
13. "Rant and Roar" (Traditional) 2:40
14. "Jolly Beggarman [hidden track]" (Traditional) 3:00
