= Safe Upon the Shore =

Safe Upon The Shore

Studio album by Great Big Sea
- Released: July 13, 2010
- Recorded: 2009–2010 at Great Big Studio in St. John’s, Newfoundland, Various Tour Buses, dressing rooms and The Music Shed, New Orleans, Humber Valley Resort
- Genre: Folk rock
- Length: 45:28
- Label: Warner Music Canada
- Producer: Steve Berlin

Great Big Sea chronology
Fortune's Favour (2008)	Safe Upon The Shore (2010)	XX (2012)

Safe Upon the Shore is the ninth and final studio album released by Canadian folk rock band Great Big Sea. The album was released on July 13, 2010.

== Track listing ==
No.	Title	Writer(s)	Length
1.	"Long Life (Where Did You Go)"	Séan McCann, Jeen O'Brien, Joel Plaskett	3:12
2.	"Nothing But a Song"	Alan Doyle, Séan McCann	3:04
3.	"Yankee Sailor"	Alan Doyle, Bob Hallett, Paul Lamb, Joel Plaskett	4:10
4.	"Good People"	Séan McCann, Paul Lamb	2:35
5.	"Dear Home Town"	Alan Doyle, Randy Bachman	3:58
6.	"Over the Hills"	Traditional, Arr. Bob Hallett	3:09
7.	"Hit the Ground and Run"	Alan Doyle, Russell Crowe	3:02
8.	"Safe Upon the Shore"	Séan McCann, Murray Foster	3:28
9.	"Have a Cuppa Tea"	Ray Davies	3:12
10.	"Wandering Ways"	Séan McCann, Greg Browne	3:19
11.	"Follow Me Back"	Bob Hallett, Jeremy Fisher, Jeen O'Brien	3:21
12.	"Road to Ruin"	Alan Doyle, Paul Lamb, Joel Plaskett	2:23
13.	"Gallows Pole"	Traditional, arranged by Robert Plant, Jimmy Page	2:58
14.	"Don't Wanna Go Home"	Alan Doyle	3:46

iTunes Canada Deluxe Version
No.	Title	Writer(s)	Length
15.	"Protest Song"	Sean McCann, Jeremy Fisher	3:12
16.	"Nothing But A Song (Video)"	Alan Doyle, Séan McCann	3:14
17.	"Nothing But A Song (Demo) [Pre-Order Only]"	Alan Doyle, Séan McCann	3:44

iTunes US Bonus Track Version
No.	Title	Writer(s)	Length
15.	"Nothing But A Song (Demo) [Bonus Track]"	Alan Doyle, Séan McCann	3:44
16.	"Protest Song (Bonus Track) [Pre-Order Only]"	Sean McCann, Jeremy Fisher	3:12

Tracks 2, 3, 4, 7, and the bonus tracks were road tested before they recorded it in the studio.

== Reception ==
Professional ratings
Review scores
Source	Rating
Allmusic	3.5/5 stars

=== Commercial performance ===
The album debuted at No. 2 on the Canadian Albums Chart, falling short to Eminem's Recovery. The album sold 7,000 copies in its first week, while Eminem placed first with 30,000 copies.

=== Critical reception ===
Greg Prato of allmusic gave the album mainly positive reviews, saying "there is more than meets the eye (or more fittingly, the ear) to this Canadian outfit. Great Big Sea has created a pure 'heartland sound' all its own."

== Personnel ==
- Alan Doyle – Vocals, Guitars, Bouzouki, Mandolin, Banjo, Piano
- Bob Hallett – Vocals, Accordion, Concertina, Whistle, Harmonica, Bouzouki, Mandolin, Fiddle, Banjo, Pipes
- Séan McCann – Vocals, Guitar, Bodhran, Percussion

With

- Murray Foster - Vocals, Bass, Guitar
- Kris MacFarlane - Vocals, Drums, Percussion, Guitar, Keyboards, Piano Accordion

Guest Musicians

- Sonny Landreth - Slide Guitar
- Jeen O'Brien - Vocals
- Steve Berlin - Keyboards, Melodica, Percussion
- Washboard Hank - Washboard
- Mark Mullins - Trombone, Arrangements
- Craig Klein - Trombone
- Greg Hicks - Trombone
- J.P. Cormier - Mandolin, Guitar, Banjo, Fiddle
- Shannon Powell - Tambourine
- Jeremy Fisher - Guitar

== Charts and sales ==
=== Weekly charts ===
Chart (2010)	Peak position
US Billboard 200	159
US Billboard Top Heatseekers	4
US Billboard Top Folk Albums	3
Canadian Albums Chart	2

=== Sales ===
Country	Sales
Canada	7,000
