= The Mermaid (Shel Silverstein song) =

"The Mermaid" is a song about a whaler falling in love with a mermaid, but despairs because the mermaid has fish parts below her waist. It was written by Shel Silverstein and recorded on his album I'm So Good That I Don't Have to Brag, in 1965. In December 1966, "The Mermaid" was published in Playboy magazine while Silverstein was a regular contributor. Bobby Bare released a version on his 1973 album Bobby Bare Sings Lullabys, Legends and Lies. It was covered in 2005 by Great Big Sea, who released their version on their CD The Hard and the Easy. Glenn Yarbrough also sings a version on his 1966 album Live at the Hungry I.
