= Fortune's Favour =

Studio album by Great Big Sea
- Released: June 24, 2008 (Canada), July 8, 2008 (US)
- Recorded: 2007
- Studio: Great Big Studio in St. John’s, Newfoundland
- Genre: Folk rock
- Length: 54:23
- Label: Warner Music Canada
- Producer: Hawksley Workman

Great Big Sea chronology
| The Hard and the Easy (2005) | Fortune's Favour (2008) | Safe Upon the Shore (2010) |

Fortune's Favour is the eighth studio album released by Canadian folk rock band Great Big Sea. The album was released on June 24, 2008, debuting at No. 5 on the Canadian Music Charts and also includes a DVD. The album was certified gold in Canada.

The album was recorded at the band's studio in St. John’s, Newfoundland, with Hawksley Workman producing. "Oh Yeah" was the theme song for the CBC Television series Republic of Doyle.

== Track listing ==
1. "Love Me Tonight" – (Séan McCann, Alan Doyle, Hawksley Workman, Jeen O'Brien) 4:11
2. "Walk on the Moon" – (Alan Doyle, Gordie Sampson) 3:44
3. "England" – (Séan McCann) 3:45
4. "Here and Now" – (Séan McCann, Alan Doyle, Bob Hallett, Hawksley Workman, Jeen O'Brien) 3:40
5. "Long Lost Love" – (Séan McCann, Chris Trapper) 5:26
6. "Oh Yeah" – (Séan McCann, Alan Doyle, Bob Hallett, Hawksley Workman, Jeen O'Brien) 2:15
7. "Banks of Newfoundland" – (Traditional, Arranged Alan Doyle, Séan McCann, Bob Hallett) 3:24
8. "Dream to Live" – (Séan McCann, Chris Trapper) 4:15
9. "Company of Fools" – (Alan Doyle, Russell Crowe) 4:02
10. "Hard Case" – (Séan McCann, Kalem Mahoney, Jeen O'Brien) 3:47
11. "Rocks of Merasheen" – (Al Pitman, Pat Byrne, Arranged Alan Doyle, Séan McCann, Bob Hallett) 4:05
12. "Dance Dance" – (Séan McCann, Alan Doyle, Bob Hallett, Hawksley Workman, Jeen O'Brien) 2:49
13. "Heart of Stone" – (Séan McCann, Kalem Mahoney, Jeen O'Brien) 4:54
14. "Straight to Hell" – (Alan Doyle) 4:16

== Personnel ==
- Alan Doyle – vocals, guitar, bouzouki
- Bob Hallett – vocals, bouzouki, fiddle, banjo, accordion, whistles, harmonica
- Séan McCann – vocals, guitar, bodhrán, banjo

With

- Murray Foster – bass, vocals
- Kris MacFarlane – drums, percussion, guitar, piano, accordion, vocals

Guest musicians

- Hawksley Workman – drums, percussion, guitar, bass, piano, Hammond, Rhodes
- Jeen O'Brien – vocals
- Keith Power – orchestral arrangement on "Walk on the Moon"

== Singles ==
- "Walk On the Moon" (released to radio April 2008; reached No. 86 on Canadian Hot 100)
