= Great Big DVD and CD =

Live album & DVD by Great Big Sea
- Released: 2004 (Canada)
- Genre: Folk
- Length: 1:14:49
- Label: Zoë Records

Great Big Sea chronology
Something Beautiful* (2004)	Great Big DVD and CD (2004)

Great Big DVD and CD is a live recording by Canadian folk group, Great Big Sea, released on Zoë Records in 2004. The package contains two discs, one in CD format and one in NTSC DVD format with no region coding. Both CD and DVD contain the same tracks recorded live in Ottawa, Canada. The DVD comes with an interactive menu and special features, including various video clips, karaoke clips, "home videos", a documentary and a text file about the band. It was released on the iTunes Store on June 14, 2011 as "Great Big Sea (Live)".

== Track listing ==
1. Donkey Riding (Traditional) 2:22
2. When I'm Up (Ian Telfer, Alan Prosser, John Jones) 4:18
3. Sea Of No Cares (Alan Doyle, Séan McCann, Chris Trapper) 3:35
4. Boston and St. Johns (Alan Doyle) 4:49
5. The Night Pat Murphy Died (Alan Doyle) 3:36
6. Stumbling In (Alan Doyle) 3:07
7. Jack Hinks (Traditional) 5:32
8. Goin Up (Alan Doyle) 4:06
9. General Taylor (Arranged By Alan Doyle, Séan McCann, Bob Hallett, Darrell Power) 4:11
10. Lukey (Arranged By Alan Doyle, Séan McCann, Bob Hallett, Darrell Power) 3:52
11. Clearest Indication (Alan Doyle, Séan McCann, Chris Trapper) 4:04
12. I'm A Rover (Traditional) 3:32
13. Everything Shines (Chris Trapper) 3:03
14. Mari-Mac (Arranged By Alan Doyle, Séan McCann, Bob Hallett, Darrell Power) 3:45
15. Consequence Free (Alan Doyle, Séan McCann, Bob Hallett, Darrell Power) 3:12
16. Ordinary Day (Alan Doyle, Séan McCann) 4:09
17. It's the End of the World As We Know It (Bill Berry, Peter Buck, Mike Mills, Michael Stipe) 3:17
18. Excursion Around the Bay (Johnny Burke) 2:20
19. Fortune Set (Arranged By Alan Doyle, Séan McCann, Bob Hallett, Darrell Power) 2:53
20. The Old Black Rum (Bob Hallett) 5:17

== Technical specifications ==
Total Running Time: 151 minutes
Picture format - standard 4:3
Audio: 5.1 Surround and Stereo
No Region Code
NTSC Format DVD
