= Excursion Around the Bay =

Folk song by Johnny Burke

"Excursion Around The Bay" is a folk song written by Johnny Burke (1851-1930) in Newfoundland.

It was covered by Great Big Sea on their 1993 and 2000 albums, Great Big Sea and Road Rage, and then again on their live recording, Great Big DVD and CD. Most recently it was featured on their album Courage & Patience & Grit.

It was covered by the Derina Harvey Band on their 2013 album "dHb."

== Lyrics ==
It was early Monday morning, and the day be calm and fine,
To the Harbour Grace excursion, with the boys to have a time;
And just before the sailor pulled the gangway from the pier,
I saw some fella haul me wife on board as a Volunteer.

Chorus:

O Me, O My, I heard me poor wife cry,
O Me, O My, I think I'm gonna die;
O Me, O My, I heard me poor wife say,
I wish I'd never taken this excursion around the bay.

We had three hundred souls on board, oh what a splendid sight,
Matt Strong in regimentals, to make our spirits bright;
With meself being in the double, with the funny things they'd say,
And they'd choke themselves from laughing, when they see us in the bay.

O Me, O My, I heard me poor wife cry,
O Me, O My, I think I'm gonna die;
O Me, O My, I heard me poor wife say,
I wish I'd never taken this excursion around the bay.

Now, me wife she got no better, she turned a sickly green,
I fed her cake and candy, fat pork and kerosene;
Castor-oil and sugar of candy, I rubbed pure-oil on her face,
And they said she'd be a dandy, when she reaches Harbour Grace.

O Me, O My, I heard me poor wife cry,
O Me, O My, I think I'm gonna die;
O Me, O My, I heard me poor wife say,
I wish I'd never taken this excursion around the bay.

My wife she got no better, my wife, my darling dear,
The screeches from her throat, you could hear in Carbonear;
I searched every place in Harbour Grace, searched every store and shop,
To get her something for the cure, or take her to the hop.

O Me, O My, I heard me poor wife cry,
O Me, O My, I think I'm gonna die;
O Me, O My, I heard me poor wife say,
I wish I'd never taken this excursion around the bay.

Oh, she died below the Brandies, as we were coming back,
We buried her in the ocean, wrapped up in the Union Jack;
And now I am a single man, in search of a pretty face,
And the woman who says she'll have me, sure I'm off for Harbour Grace.

O Me, O My, I heard me poor wife cry,
O Me, O My, I think I'm gonna die;
O Me, O My, I heard me poor wife say,
I wish I'd never taken this excursion around the bay.

== Meaning ==
Excursions were a long-standing tradition of St. John's, Newfoundland and Labrador. They were essentially an all-day party attended by hundreds of people, in which they would all travel together by train or boat and then do activities at the destination. Excursions were often characterized by excessive drinking and rowdy behaviour. One of the most popular destinations was Harbour Grace, as immortalized in the song.

== See also ==
- List of Newfoundland songs
