= Chris Trapper =

American songwriter and musician (born 1971)

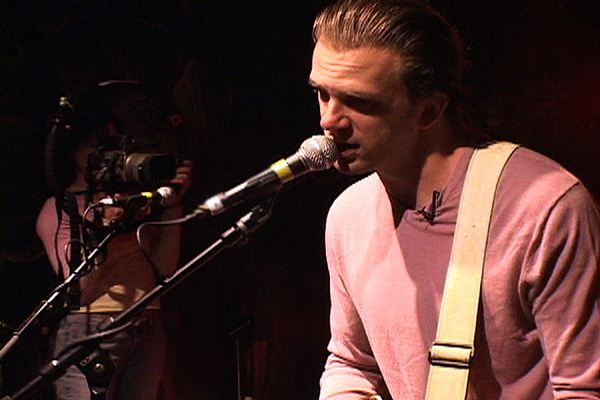

Background information
- Born: Christopher James Trapper; March 31, 1971 (age 55); Buffalo, New York, U.S.
- Genres: Folk, pop rock, power pop
- Occupations: Musician, songwriter
- Instruments: Vocals, guitar, harmonica, piano, ukulele
- Years active: 1996–present
- Labels: Imago, Co-Op Pop, Capitol Records, 33rd Street Records, Starlit Records

Chris Trapper (born March 31, 1971) is an American songwriter and musician, best known as the singer and guitarist of the band The Push Stars. His song “This Time” appeared in August Rush.

== Early life ==
He is the youngest of six children in a working-class family from Buffalo, New York. Trapper relocated to Boston after college.

== Career ==
He formed The Push Stars with Dan McLoughlin and Ryan MacMillan in Boston. In 1999, the band released their Capitol Records debut After the Party and subsequently released two more records before going on hiatus in 2005.

Trapper embarked on a successful solo career, touring the globe and releasing nine full-length albums to date. Trapper's songs can be heard in other films including There’s Something About Mary, The Devil Wears Prada, Some Kind of Beautiful.

His songs have appeared on television shows such as Pepper Dennis, ER, and Malcolm in the Middle. In 2018, The Push Stars released their first album in 14 years, 3 Feet in the Air, recorded at Ardent Studios in Memphis.

A constant live performer, Trapper has performed an average of 150 shows a year for more than a decade.

== Recognition ==
- Buffalo Music Hall of Fame (2018)
- SOCAN songwriting award for his contribution to the album Sea of No Cares by Great Big Sea (2003)

== Discography ==
=== Cold Water Waltz (2020) ===
1. Under Blue Stars
2. Clear
3. Answer Me
4. Back Home
5. Love & Faith
6. Party in the Parking Lot
7. Grace Let Me In
8. Out of the Limelight
9. Make It Through
10. Starlight Creek
11. Cathedral Bells
12. Light in Your Eyes
13. Cold Water Waltz (Instrumental)

=== Symphonies of Dirt and Dust (2015) ===
1. Angel Appearing in a Small Cafe
2. Everything Was Possible
3. If You're Still There
4. Best in Me
5. Heart in the Sea
6. Not the End of the World
7. Symphonies of Dirt and Dust
8. Into the Bright Lights
9. Blind Leading the Blind
10. Honest Man in California
11. F#*k It
12. Boston Strong

=== Technicolor (2013) ===
1. Extraordinary
2. Northwest Sun
3. Technicolor
4. All of This and Everything
5. I'll Count You
6. West Side
7. The Accident
8. Ohio
9. Bye Bye Beautiful
10. God in Every Cloud
11. Good Times
12. Werewolf in Times Square
13. Sober for a Living
14. For the Wondering
15. Waving as I Go
16. Top of the Sky
17. From the Ashes

=== The Few and the Far Between (2011) ===
1. Here All Along (featuring Rob Thomas)
2. Long Goodbye
3. The More I Think (featuring Colin Hay)
4. Skin
5. Ghost in Your Arms (featuring Kristin Cifelli)
6. Easy Flyer
7. Few and Far Between
8. Still in Me
9. Eyes Twice the Size
10. Not Normal
11. Search Inside
12. Wake me with Your Kiss
13. Lonesome Parade (for Phyllis Malloy & Juri Bunetta)
14. Home

=== Gone Again (feat. The Wolverine Jazz Band) (2011) ===
1. All Time Favorite
2. Gone Again
3. Nowhere
4. Jukebox Lights
5. Away We Go
6. Boston Girl
7. Dinner and a Dream
8. Kids to Chase
9. Meant to Be
10. Party at the Andersons
11. Kiss You Where You Lay
12. Keg on My Coffin (Live)

=== Into the Bright Lights [EP] (2010) ===
1. Family Tree
2. The Game Is Done
3. Into the Bright Lights
4. Heartaches on Parade
5. From the Balcony
6. Already Gone
7. Black Sky Blue

=== 'Til the Last Leaf Falls (2008) ===
1. This Time
2. Wait a Lifetime
3. Black Hearted Bride
4. Cost of Constant Traveling
5. In My Sight
6. Look What the Wind Blew In
7. Big Mistake
8. Least You're Breathing
9. Across the World
10. Curbside View
11. Black Eye
12. Til the Last Leaf Falls
13. Passing

=== Songs from the Middle of the World - Solo/Acoustic Rarities Vol.1 (2008) ===
1. Faded and Jaded
2. A Day Without You
3. $100 Man
4. Living Downtown
5. Letter to the Middle of the World
6. These Mistakes
7. Black Sky Blue
8. Feel Like Staying Home
9. The Losing End
10. Falling Away
11. Avalanche
12. Mid-Summer Nights Kidnapping Case
13. Hard Times
14. Wrong Side of Town
15. What Are You Gonna Do?
16. Who Can Save Me
17. Anywhere You Are

=== It's Christmas Time (2007) ===
1. It's Christmas Time
2. Black and Blue Christmas
3. Thorn Becomes a Rose
4. Christmas Magic
5. One Bright Star
6. This December
7. Wish It Was Christmas Day
8. California Holiday
9. Christmas Ends a Day Too Soon
10. Mystified

=== Hey You (2006) ===
1. Feelings Without Weight
2. Into the Wasteland
3. Say It Loud
4. In from the Outside
5. See Something Fly
6. Wish I Was Cool
7. Forget Me
8. 35th Birthday
9. Perfumed Hair
10. Tear Choked Eye
11. Yearning to be Burning
12. Better Half
13. Lonely Valentine
14. Every Time I See You
15. Weightless

=== Songs from the Drive-In (2002) ===
1. Time to Forgive
2. Elvis Presley Boulevard
3. Midnight Cabaret
4. Summertime Is Here
5. House Next to the Drive-In
6. Happy Where I Am
7. Birthday Song
8. Ever Since the Day
9. Me and My Blue Water
10. Starlight
