= Have a Cuppa Tea =

Song by the Kinks

from the album Muswell Hillbillies
- Released: 24 November 1971 (US); 26 November 1971 (UK)
- Recorded: August–September 1971
- Studio: Morgan, Willesden, London
- Genre: Folk rock; music hall
- Length: 3:45
- Label: RCA
- Songwriter: Ray Davies
- Producer: Ray Davies

"Have a Cuppa Tea" is a song written by Ray Davies and performed by the Kinks on their 1971 album Muswell Hillbillies.

Like many Kinks songs, it is stylistically influenced by the British Music Hall. It also has a slight country influence—with the mesh of these two styles being a hallmark of the album. It is believed to be about Ray and Dave's grandmother.

The lyrics humorously celebrate the British custom of drinking tea, and the civility that comes with it. Some absurd claims are made of the drink in a tongue-in-cheek fashion, such as "It's a cure for tonsillitis and for water on the knee." Yet the song also observes:

Whatever the situation, whatever the race or creed,
Tea knows no segregation, no class nor pedigree
It knows no motivation, no sect nor organisation,
It knows no one religion,
Nor political belief.

The lyrics also feature a parody/homage to the McGuire Sisters' 1958 hit song "Sugartime":

Tea in the morning, tea in the evening, tea at supper time!
You get tea when it's raining, tea when it's snowing,
Tea when the weather's fine!

Though it was never a single in either the United Kingdom or the United States, it was released as a single in Angola. It was an occasional feature of the Kinks live act of the early 1970s, and was also performed live by the group on the BBC TV show The Old Grey Whistle Test in January 1972.

The song was covered by Great Big Sea for their 2010 album Safe Upon the Shore.
