= Polynya (disambiguation) =

A polynya is a non-linear area of open water surrounded by sea ice.

Polynya may also refer to:

- Polynia (ship), a ship crushed in sea ice in 1891 and commemorated in the song Old Polina
- Polynia Island, an island in Canada once part of the British Arctic Territories
- Polynia River, river in Sverdlovsk Oblast, Russia
