= Lukey =

Lukey may refer to:

- Len Lukey (died 1978), Australian racing driver, winner of the 1959 Australian Drivers' Championship
- T. V. H. Lukey, a co-creator of the English Mastiff dog breed
- Lucas "Lukey" Ebenezer Hinks, a character in the comic strip Barney Google and Snuffy Smith
- "Lukey's Boat", a comical folk song retitled "Lukey" for the Great Big Sea album Up
- Lukey, a brand owned by Tenneco, an American Fortune 500 company
