= Play (Great Big Sea album) =

Studio album by Great Big Sea
- Released: May 20, 1997 (Canada)
- Recorded: 1997
- Studios: The Battery and CBC Studios
- Genres: Folk, folk rock
- Length: 47:22
- Label: Warner Music Canada
- Producer: Danny Greenspoon

Great Big Sea chronology
Up (1995)	Play (1997)	Rant and Roar (1998)

Singles from Play
- 1. "When I'm Up (I Can't Get Down)" Released: May 1997; 2. "Ordinary Day" Released: October 1997; 3. "End of the World" Released: 1998

Professional ratings
Review scores
Source	Rating
Allmusic	4/5 stars

Play is the third studio album by Canadian band Great Big Sea, released in 1997.

== Commercial performance ==
Play debuted at #9 on the Canadian Albums Chart. It was among the top 50 best-selling albums in Canada in 1997. In 2004, the album was certified Triple Platinum in Canada. Between 1996 and 2016, it was the ninth best-selling album by a Canadian band in Canada.

== Track listing ==
1. "Ordinary Day" (Alan Doyle, Séan McCann) 3:09
2. "When I'm Up (I Can't Get Down)" (Ian Telfer, Alan Prosser, John Jones) 3:24
3. "The Night Pat Murphy Died" (Traditional, arranged by Great Big Sea) 3:02
4. "How Did We Get from Saying 'I Love You'..." (Alan Doyle) 3:40
5. "Donkey Riding" (Traditional) 2:26
6. "Haven't Seen You in a Long Time" (Colin Hay) 2:53
7. "End of the World" (Bill Berry, Peter Buck, Mike Mills, Michael Stipe) 2:41
8. "General Taylor" (Arranged by Alan Doyle, Séan McCann, Bob Hallett, Darrell Power) 2:53
9. "Seagulls" (Bob Hallett) 2:10
10. "Recruiting Sargeant" (Traditional) 3:32
11. "Greenspond" (Traditional) 3:09
12. "My Apology" (Séan McCann) 2:39
13. "Jakey's Gin" (Traditional) 2:54
14. "Something I Should Know" (Séan McCann) 2:59
15. "Jolly Roving Tar" (Traditional) 2:59
16. "Rigadoon" (Sometimes referred to as "Little Beggarman" or "Jolly Beggar Dude") (Alan Doyle, Séan McCann, Bob Hallett, Darrell Power) 3:00

== Song information ==
- "Recruiting Sargeant" is about Royal Newfoundland Regiment in World War I, and was adapted from an old Scottish traditional song "Twa Recruitin' Sergeants" about the Black Watch Regiment apparently from the time of the Napoleonic Wars, and so consequently the song has some interesting similarities to another traditional army song from the same period, Over the Hills and Far Away. The GBS version is from a play called The Recruiting Officer.
- "Greenspond" is about Greenspond, Newfoundland and Labrador, a small fishing community on the north east coast of Newfoundland, Canada.
- Track 16, a bonus, untitled song, is a traditional Irish song which fans refer to as "Little Beggarman", "Rigadoon", or "Jolly Beggar Dude".
