= Donkey Riding =

Traditional work song or sea shanty

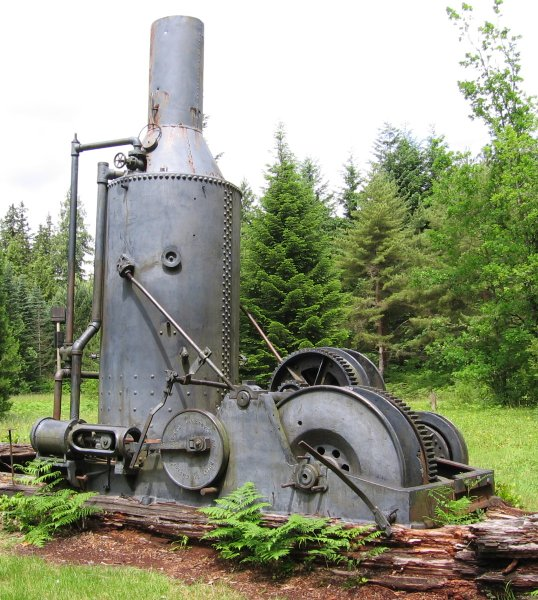
A steam donkey, a type of steam-powered winch. The title "Donkey Riding" is thought to reference this type of machine.

"Donkey Riding" (Roud 4540) is a traditional work song or sea shanty originally sung in Canada, Scotland and the Northeastern United States. It has also become popular as a children's song. The earliest written record of the song dates to 1857. The tune and words are an adaptation of "Highland Laddie". It is generally, but not universally, agreed that the "donkey" of the song title is a reference to the steam donkey, a kind of general-purpose steam engine. Stan Hugill, a sea-music historian, said that he had been informed that the song was also sung in the Gulf Ports as well as being popular at sea.

== Recordings ==
Recordings of this song include:

- Great Big Sea on the albums Play and Road Rage
- Being a well-documented song publicised by Mudcat and Mainly Norfolk, the song was recorded by Jon Boden and Oli Steadman for inclusion in their respective lists of daily folk songs "A Folk Song a Day" and "365 Days Of Folk".
