= Old Polina =

19th-century Newfoundland folk song

Old Polina (Roud 285) is a traditional Newfoundland folk song. It is most likely based on the ship Polynia, built in 1861, of the Dundee Seal and Whale Fishing Company fleet. Polynia was commanded by Captain William Guy from 1883 to 1891, when she was sunk by ice in Davis Strait. This song is similar to another song called The Balaena, about another whaler.

== Background story ==
Every year, the whaling fleet would sail from Dundee, Scotland to Newfoundland, there to pick up men to hunt the whales. Since the first ships to make it to Newfoundland would be able to pick the most experienced men, ships competed to reach Newfoundland first. The other ships named in the song, Arctic, Aurora, Terra Nova, and Husky, are all ships from the Dundee Seal and Whale Fishing Company fleet. Aurora was the ship that rescued the crew of Polynia in 1891 when she sank. Art Jackman, Mullins, and Fairweather were captains of the ships at that time. There are records of a Captain Fairweather in command of Balaena (mentioned in 1894 and 1896), an Alex Fairweather in command of Terra Nova (1885-1893), and a J. Fairweather for Aurora (1882-1886).

This song has been published in a number of song books, including the 1955 edition of Gerald S. Doyle's Old-Time Songs and Poetry of Newfoundland, as well as Paul Mercer's Newfoundland Songs and Ballads in Print 1842-1974 and Michael Taft's A Regional Discography of Newfoundland and Labrador 1904-1972.

== Recordings ==
There are a number of recordings of this song available, including:

- Trade Winds, recorded by Omar Blondahl
- Another Time - The Songs of Newfoundland, recorded by Fergus O'Byrne (of Ryan's Fancy fame) (1991)
- Newfoundland, recorded by Mark Hiscock on an album with Chris Andrews (both of Shanneyganock fame)
- The Hard and the Easy, by Great Big Sea (2005)
- Winners and Boozers, recorded by Fiddler’s Green (2013)

== Lyrics ==
There’s a noble fleet of whalers a-sailing from Dundee,
Manned by British sailors to take them o’er the sea.
On a western ocean passage we started on the trip.
We flew along just like a song in our gallant whaling ship.

‘Twas the second Sunday morning, just after leaving port,
We met a heavy Sou’west gale that washed away our boat.
It washed away our quarterdeck, our stanchions just as well,
And so we sent the whole shebang a-floating in the gale.

CHORUS :
For the wind was on her quarter and the engine’s working free.
There’s not another whaler that sails the Arctic Sea
Can beat the Old Polina, you need not try, my sons,
For we challenged all both great and small from Dundee to St. John’s.

Art Jackman set his canvas, Fairweather got up steam,
But Captain Guy, the daring boy, came plunging through the stream.
And Mullins in the Husky tried to beat the blooming lot,
But to beat the Old Polina was something he could not.

CHORUS

There’s the noble Terra Nova, a model without doubt.
The Arctic and Aurora they talk so much about.
Art Jackman’s model mailboat, the terror of the sea,
Tried to beat the Old Polina on a passage from Dundee.

CHORUS

And now we’re back in old St. John’s where rum is very cheap.
So we’ll drink a health to Captain Guy who brought us o’er the deep.
A health to all our sweethearts and to our wives so fair.
Not another ship could make the trip but the Polina I declare.

== The Other Ships ==
The Aurora was built in 1876, and was a whaling ship until 1910, when it was bought by Douglas Mawson for a scientific expedition to Antarctica from 1911 to 1914. It disappeared, with all hands, in 1918.

The whaling ship Terra Nova was built in 1884, but was used for Antarctic exploration between 1894 and 1913. She returned to the Newfoundland seal fishery from 1913, until 1943, when she sank off the coast of Greenland. The crew was rescued by a US Coastguard ship.
