= Laura Smith (Canadian singer) =

Canadian singer-songwriter (1952–2020)

- Born: March 18, 1952; London, Ontario, Canada
- Died: March 7, 2020 (aged 67) Mahone Bay, Nova Scotia, Canada
- Genres: Folk, adult contemporary
- Occupation: Singer-songwriter
- Instruments: Vocals, guitar, bodhrán, piano
- Years active: 1989–2020
- Label: Borealis
- Website: Laura Smith

Laura Smith (March 18, 1952 – March 7, 2020) was a Canadian folk singer-songwriter. She is best known for her 1995 single "Shade of Your Love", one of the year's biggest hits on adult contemporary radio stations in Canada, and for her adaptation of the Scottish folk song "My Bonnie Lies over the Ocean" which she entitled "My Bonny". She recorded a version of this with The Chieftains, which they erroneously listed as "My Bonnie" on their album Fire in the Kitchen. In December 2010, that version received a nod for Song of the Decade from Bill Margeson at LiveIreland.

== Biography ==
Born and raised in London, Ontario, Smith was encouraged in her early writing by the noted poet Margaret Avison, then writer-in-residence at the University of Western Ontario. She began playing music as well, making her debut in area coffeehouses. She moved to Toronto in 1975 for nine years; in 1984, she moved to Cape Breton.

Smith released her debut album, Elemental, under the auspices of CBC Variety Recordings in 1989. It was recorded at CBC Halifax. Unbeknownst to Smith or CBC, at about the same time, Loreena McKennitt released an album with the same title, so Smith's debut release was changed to Laura Smith when she leased back the masters from CBC. Her second album, B'tween the Earth and My Soul (1994) brought her national acclaim and earned her two East Coast Music Awards (Female Artist, Album of the Year) and two Juno nominations for Best New Solo Artist and Best Roots and Traditional Album. The next year, 1997, she was awarded a Gemini Award for Best Performance in a Performing Arts Program or Series.

In 2003, Smith was given a DHumL from Mount Saint Vincent University for her songwriting.

She continued to work through the 2000s, including two seasons on stage in Prince Edward Island in the role of Marilla in the musical Anne & Gilbert at the Victoria Playhouse in Victoria-by-the-Sea and the Jubilee Theatre in Summerside respectively. However, through the decade she suffered three debilitating accidents which resulted in chronic pain. This led to the use of increasingly stronger prescription drugs which eventually led to dependence. She attempted to obtain a Music Therapy degree from Acadia University, but gave up her studies to concentrate on healing. She disappeared from the music scene for a time, but by 2010 she was performing again, having overcome her dependency through the adoption of non-narcotic pain treatment therapies. Her story was featured in a radio documentary by Ann Silversides which aired on CBC Radio One's morning program The Current on February 3, 2010. In 2010 and 2011 she performed several shows across Canada, touring with Ryan MacGrath.

In 2012 Cathie Ryan recorded a version of Smith's "I'm a Beauty" on her album Through Wind and Rain.

Smith completed her first recording in sixteen years, Everything Is Moving, in January 2013. It was released by Borealis Records on April 10, 2013.

Poet Phil Hall celebrated Laura Smith's singing in his poem "Tremulous" (Niagara & Government, 2020, Pedlar Press). She asked him to read it her house concert audience in Fredericton in early 2019.

Smith died of cancer on March 7, 2020, in Mahone Bay, Nova Scotia, where she lived. She was 67.

== Discography ==
=== Albums ===
Year	Album	CAN
1989	Laura Smith	—
1994	B'tween the Earth and My Soul	86
1997	It's a Personal Thing	—
1998	Vanity Pressed: A Collection	—
2013	Everything Is Moving	—

=== Singles ===
Year	Single	Chart Positions		Album
Year	Single	CAN AC	CAN	Album
1995	"Shade of Your Love"	6	42	B'tween the Earth and My Soul
1995	"My Bonny"	33	—	B'tween the Earth and My Soul
1997	"It's a Personal Thing"	17	—	It's a Personal Thing
1997	"For Better or for Worse"	54	—	It's a Personal Thing

=== Guest singles ===
Year	Single	Artist	Chart Positions		Album
Year	Single	Artist	CAN AC	CAN Country	Album
1996	"Don't Take Me Home"	Terry Kelly	51	38	Far Cry from Leaving
