= Darrell Power =

Canadian musician and actor

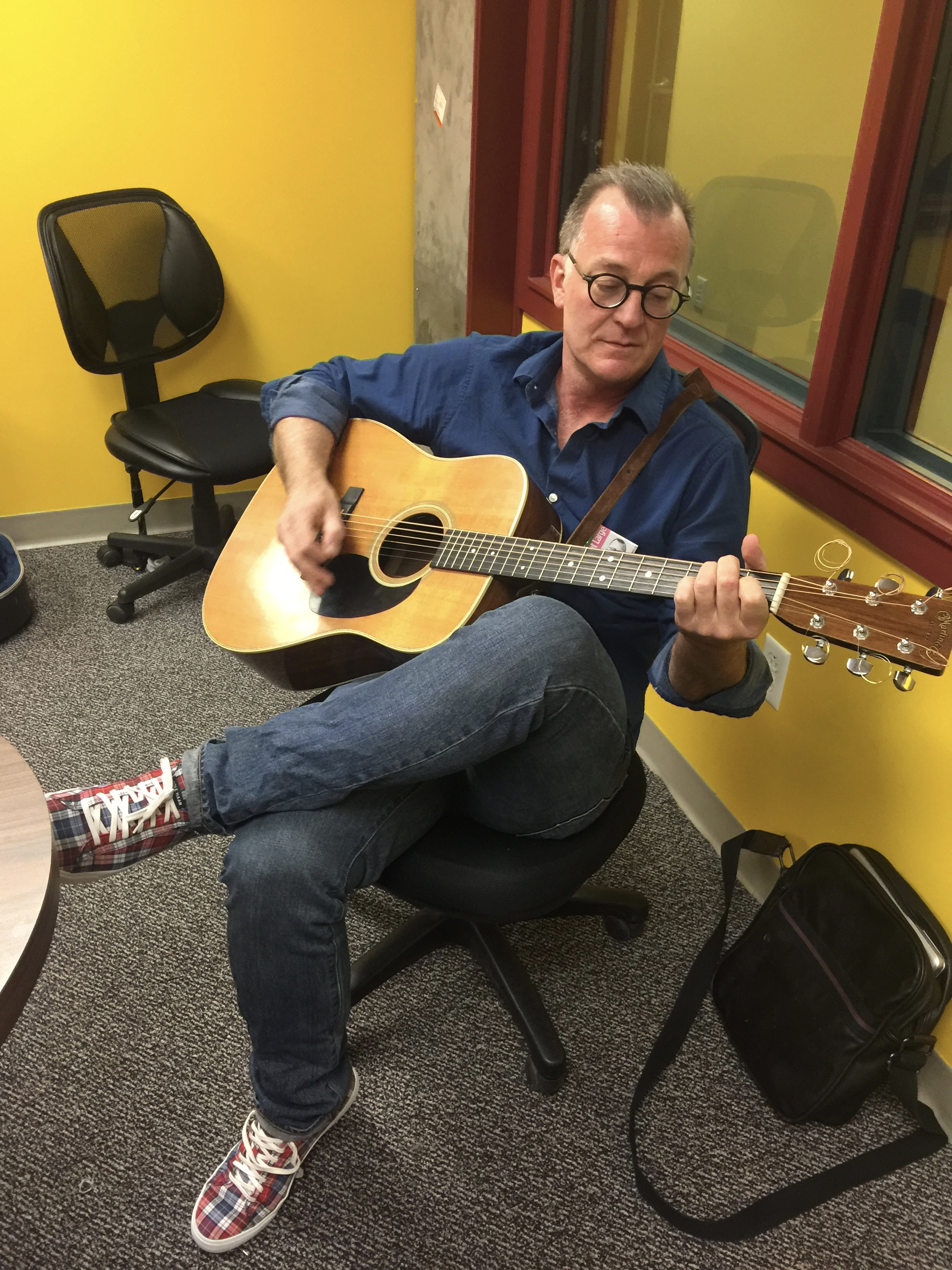
- Darrell Power in 2017

Background information
- Born: June 3, 1968 (age 58); Outer Cove, Newfoundland and Labrador, Canada
- Occupations: Musician, producer, songwriter, substitute teacher
- Instruments: Singing, bass guitar, acoustic guitar, bones
- Years active: 1993–Present
- Formerly of: Great Big Sea
- Website: www.greatbigsea.com

Darrell Power (born June 3, 1968) is a Canadian musician, singer, songwriter, music producer, and former member of Canadian folk rock band Great Big Sea (1993–2003). He is a guest host of VOCM Nightline and Open Line. Power currently works as a substitute teacher. He lives in downtown St. John's, Newfoundland and Labrador, Canada.

== Education ==
Power grew up in Outer Cove and attended Gonzaga High School. He later attended Memorial University of Newfoundland, where he met the other members of Great Big Sea. All the members of the group were pursuing English degrees at the time.

A devoted lifelong learner, Power was named Memorial University's 1999 Alumni of the Year, along with his bandmates.

== Musical career ==
=== Great Big Sea ===
Great Big Sea played its first official gig on March 11, 1993, opening for the Irish Descendants at Memorial University of Newfoundland in St. John's, Newfoundland. The founding band members included Alan Doyle (vocals, guitar, bouzouki, mandolin), Séan McCann (vocals, bodhrán, guitar, tin whistle), Power (vocals, bass, guitar, bones), and Bob Hallett (vocals, fiddle, accordion, mandolin, concertina, bouzouki, whistles, bagpipes). The formation and growth of the band has been written about extensively by Doyle in his memoirs Where I Belong and A Newfoundlander in Canada.

After the release of their initial self-titled album Great Big Sea, the band was signed by Warner Music Canada to record their second album Up, which went 4× Platinum. Their next effort, Play, went 3× Platinum. Turn and Sea of No Cares also went Platinum on the Warner label. Sea of No Cares achieved number one status on Canadian charts. The Great Big DVD and CD, recorded live in Ottawa, went 3× Platinum. Subsequent efforts went Gold, as did the twentieth-anniversary greatest hits collection XX and the live concert CD Road Rage. The band toured nearly constantly for the band's first several years, sometimes traveling as many as 300 days a year, including tours in the United States and Europe.

Power retired from Great Big Sea in 2003 to spend more time with his family. He has since made guest appearances with the 7 Deadly Sons at the Newfoundland and Labrador Folk Festival and with Great Big Sea at Torbay 250.

=== Producer ===
Power wrote and produced the theme songs for the successful provincial political campaigns of Premiers Williams, Dunderdale, and Ball. He also produced the album Tarahan's Town for the Newfoundland folk group Tarahan.

=== Festival of Friends ===
In August 2010 he appeared at the Festival of Friends Song Writer Circle in Outer Cove where he performed his own original songs. The video of the performances achieved a following on YouTube.

=== Solo performing ===
In January 2018, Power launched a series of solo performances at the small Black Sheep pub in downtown St. John's. The performances were largely original music that had been written by Power. He described it as a combination of Canadiana, Americana, and Great Big Sea music.

== Film ==
Power produced and directed the film Where There is Love.

He was the subject of the 2022 documentary The Power of Music - Darrell's Story produced by his son Ben Power. The documentary focuses on his life during and after Great Big Sea, and his plans for the future.

== Politics ==
On September 4, 2017, Power announced he was running for Councillor at Large in the City of St. John's. He ran on a platform of reduced taxes, improved efficiencies at city hall, and development of cultural industries. He received endorsements from former bandmates Alan Doyle, Sean McCann, and Bob Hallett. He was also endorsed by comedians Mark Critch and Pete Soucy. Power received 9,992 votes or 7.65% of the votes, making him 8th in a field of 12 candidates. This was not enough for Power to be elected to the At Large position, as the top four candidates are elected to seats on council.

== Philanthropy ==
Power served as Master of Ceremonies for a Refugee Immigrant Advisory Council event. He has been a songwriter volunteer for Art Smart Songwriting. In December 2017, he was one of the judges for Sing Newfoundland and Labrador, organized by former Canadian Idol judge Zack Werner.
