= Ordinary Day (Great Big Sea song) =

Single by Great Big Sea

from the album Play
- Released: October 1997
- Genre: Folk rock
- Length: 3:09
- Label: WEA
- Songwriters: Alan Doyle; Séan McCann
- Producer: Danny Greenspoon

Great Big Sea singles chronology
"When I'm Up (I Can't Get Down)" (1997)	"Ordinary Day" (1997)	"End of the World" (1998)

"Ordinary Day" is a song by Canadian folk band Great Big Sea. It was released in October 1997 as the second single from their third album Play. It peaked at No. 3 on the Canadian RPM adult contemporary chart and at No. 30 on the Canadian RPM Top Singles.

== Background and writing ==
The series of beeps at the start of the song is from a telegraph key playing SOS, according to a 2017 tweet by Alan Doyle of the Newfoundland music group Great Big Sea.

The song contains the lyric: "Janie sings on the corner, what keeps her from dying?/Let them say what they want, she won't stop trying. She might stumble, if they push her 'round/She might fall, but she'll never lie down" Alan Doyle told a story during the 2016 Juno Awards "Songwriter Circle" that he had read a story about a girl in Vancouver who was busking on the street and she got robbed and beaten up "pretty good" but she went back to the same place and started playing again. That story was part of the inspiration for their song "Ordinary Day". It was later revealed (and confirmed by Alan Doyle at the 2019 Juno Awards "Songwriter Circle") that the girl was Calgary singer/songwriter Jann Arden. In this song, Alan and his writing partner, Séan McCann, use the name as "Janie".

A music video was released for this single. The video features Great Big Sea playing the song in the middle of a rugby game.

The song has gained recent popularity through its use in gameplay videos depicting death montages, usually in games such as Dark Souls and Bloodborne.

In 2023, the song gained additional traction as its use as a goal song for Team Canada at the 2024 World Junior Ice Hockey Championship in Gothenburg, Sweden, who used its chorus. This showed a theme as in the previous tournament (held in Halifax and Moncton), Hockey Canada chose Heave Away, which also originates from Newfoundland and Labrador.

== Controversy over political use ==
In 2000, the Canadian Alliance used the song at political rallies to support Stockwell Day, without getting permission; Great Big Sea formally asked that this be stopped.

== Chart performance ==
Chart (1997–1998)	Peak position
Canadian RPM Adult Contemporary Tracks	3
Canadian RPM Top Singles	30
