= Fire in the Kitchen =

Compilation album by The Chieftains
- Released: 16 June 1998
- Recorded: October 1997
- Genre: Folk
- Length: 38:34
- Label: RCA Victor

The Chieftains chronology
Long Journey Home (1998)	Fire in the Kitchen (1998)	Silent Night: A Christmas in Rome (1998)

Professional ratings
Review scores
Source	Rating
Allmusic	3/5 stars

Fire in the Kitchen is a compilation album recorded by The Chieftains, in collaboration with an array of Canadian folk musical guests, and released in 1998.

The Chieftains, who were touring Canada that year, had not originally intended to release an album, but unexpectedly ended up recording a number of informal live sessions with guest musicians. The resulting album was billed primarily as a compilation, rather than a Chieftains album per se, although the Chieftains appear on all of the album's tracks.

== Track listing ==
1. "Madame Bonaparte/Devil's Dream/Mason's Apron" with Leahy
2. "An Innis Aigh" with The Rankins
3. "Lukey/Lukaloney" with Great Big Sea
4. "My Bonnie" with Laura Smith
5. "My Home/The Contradiction/Julia Delaney" with Ashley MacIsaac
6. "Come by the Hills" with Rita MacNeil
7. "Fingal's Cave" with Natalie MacMaster
8. "A Mhairi Bhoidheach" with Mary Jane Lamond
9. "Rattlin' Roarin' Willie" with Barra MacNeils
10. "Red Is the Rose" with The Ennis Sisters
11. "Le Lys Vert" with La Bottine Souriante
