= Captain Wedderburn's Courtship =

Traditional song

"Captain Wedderburn's Courtship" is an old Scottish ballad dating from 1785 or earlier. It is Child Ballad #46, Roud 36. It is known by a number of titles, including "Lord Roslin's Daughter" and "The Laird of Rosslyn's Daughter".

The song was collected in the United States, Scotland, Ireland, Canada, Australia. The first known publication, probably, dates from 1780s (The New British Songster).

== Synopsis ==
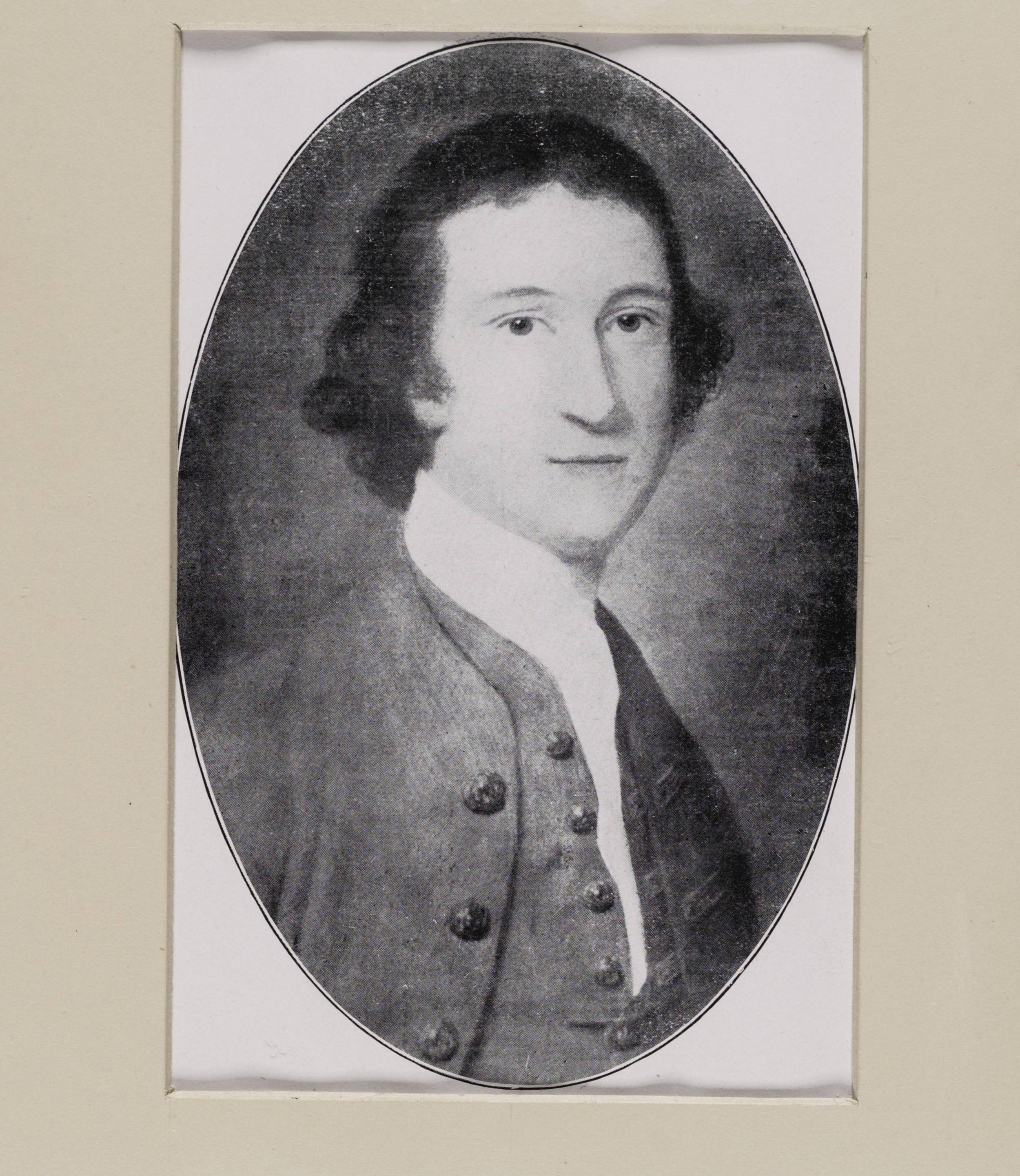
Print of a portrait of Captain Wedderburn, the younger

Versions differ, but generally a captain meets a lady walking in the woods or through an estate. Sometimes he takes her to where he is staying. In all variants, she says she will not marry or sleep with him without his answering riddles. She asks them. He answers them all, and they are married and/or he takes her to bed.

== Motifs ==
The ingenious suitor who can answer every riddle, or nonplus the heroine, is not as common as the clever maid, but occurs quite frequently in folklore.

== Recordings ==
- In 1954, Thomas Moran from Mohill, Co. Leitrim, Ireland was recorded by Séamus Ennis.
- In 1964, Canadian Folk duo Ian and Sylvia recorded this ballad as "Captain Woodstock's Courtship"; their version is from a Nova Scotia collection by Folklorist Helen Creighton.
- Tim Hart and Maddy Prior recorded the ballad in 1968 on Folk Songs of Old England Vol. 2.
- The Great Big Sea song "Captain Wedderburn" on their Turn album is based on this ballad.
- In 1988 The Voice of the People Vol 1 Come Let Us Buy the Licence - Songs of Courtship & Marriage included the ballad as The Song of the Riddles sung by Willie Clancy
- In 2007 Cara Luft recorded the song "Lord Roslyn's daughter" on the album The Light Fantastic.
- Bellowhead recorded a version on their 2010 album Hedonism.
- In 2012 The Voice of the People Second Series Good People, Take Warning : Ballads by British and Irish Traditional Singers included Captain Wedderburn sung by Séamus Ennis.
- Being a well-documented song publicised by Mudcat, and Mainly Norfolk, the song was recorded by Jon Boden and Oli Steadman for inclusion in their respective lists of daily folk songs "A Folk Song a Day" and "365 Days Of Folk".
- Oli Steadman included it on his song collection "365 Days Of Folk".

== Lyrics ==
The Laird of Rosslyn's daughter
Walked through the wood her lane.
And by came Captain Wedderburn,
A soldier of the king.
He said unto his serving man,
Were't not against the law,
I would take her to my own bed
And lay her next the wall.

I'm walking here my lane, says she,
Among my father's trees,
And you may let me walk my lane,
Kind sir, now, if you please.
The supper bell it will be rung
And I'll be missed awa',
So I'll not lie in your bed
At neither stock nor wall.

Then said the pretty lady,
I pray tell me your name.
My name is Captain Wedderburn,
A soldier of the king.
Though your father and all his men were here,
I would take you from them all,
I would take you to my own bed
And lay you next the wall.

O hold away from me,
Kind sir, I pray you let me be,
For I'll not lie in your bed
Till I get dishes three.
Three dishes for my supper,
Though I eat none at all,
Before I lie in your bed
At either stock or wall.

I must have to my supper
A chicken without a bone,
And I must have to my supper
A cherry without stone,
And I must have to my supper
A bird without a gall,
Before I lie in your bed
At either stock or wall.

The chicken when it's in the shell
I'm sure it has no bone,
And when the cherry's in the bloom
I wat it has no stone.
The dove she is a gentle bird,
She flies without a gall,
And we'll both lie in one bed
And you'll lie next the wall.

O hold away from me, kind sir,
And do not me perplex,
For I'll not lie in your bed
Till you answer questions six.
Six questions you must answer me,
And that is four and twa,
Before I lie in your bed
At either stock or wall.

O what is greener than the grass,
What's higher than the trees,
O what is worse than a woman's wish,
What's deeper than the seas,
What bird crows first, what tree buds first,
What first on them does fall,
Before I lie in your bed
At either stock or wall.

Death is greener than the grass,
Heaven's higher than the trees,
The devil's worse than woman's wish,
Hell's deeper than the seas,
The cock crows first, the cedar buds first,
Dew first on them does fall,
And we'll both lie in one bed,
And you'll lie next the wall.

Little did this lady think,
That morning when she raise,
It was to be the very last
Of all her maiden days,
For now she's Captain Wedderburn's wife,
A man she never saw,
And now they lie in one bed,
And she lies next the wall.

== See also ==
- List of the Child Ballads
