= Turn (Great Big Sea album) =

Studio album by Great Big Sea
- Released: June 22, 1999 (Canada); March 7, 2000 (US)
- Genre: Folk
- Length: 43:55
- Label: Warner Music Canada
- Producer: Steve Berlin

Great Big Sea chronology
Rant and Roar (1998)	Turn (1999)	Road Rage (2000)

Singles from Turn
- 1. "Consequence Free" Released: June 1999; 2. "Feel It Turn" Released: 1999; 3. "Can't Stop Falling" Released: 2000

Professional ratings
Review scores
Source	Rating
Allmusic	3/5 stars

Turn is the fourth studio album by Canadian folk-rock band Great Big Sea released on June 22, 1999. The album was certified Platinum in Canada on August 9, 1999. By October 2000, the album had sold 133,000 units in Canada and 10,000 in the United States.

== Track listing ==
No.	Title	Writer(s)	Length
1.	"Consequence Free"	Alan Doyle, Séan McCann	3:12
2.	"Feel It Turn"	McCann	3:50
3.	"Jack Hinks"		3:03
4.	"Boston and St. John's"	Doyle	3:47
5.	"Margarita"	McCann	3:27
6.	"Trois Navires De Blé"		4:27
7.	"Ferryland Sealer"		3:16
8.	"Can't Stop Falling"	Doyle, McCann	3:24
9.	"Demasduit Dream"	Hallett	3:32
10.	"Old Brown's Daughter"	G.W. Hunt	2:41
11.	"I'm a Rover"		2:53
12.	"Captain Wedderburn"		3:38
13.	"Bad as I Am"	Hallett, McCann	2:53
Total length:			43:55

== Song information ==
- "Consequence Free", "Feel It Turn" and "Can't Stop Falling" have been made into videos and have been released as radio singles.
- "Demasduit Dream" is based on the life of Demasduit, one of the last of the Beothuk, the native people of Newfoundland.
- "Ferryland Sealer" is about the seasonal seal hunting expeditions from the southern Newfoundland community of Ferryland.
- "Trois navires de blé" is a traditional French folk song associated with the Franco-Newfoundlander community at Port au Port.
- The lyrics to "Old Brown's Daughter" were written by the famous Johnny Burke, while the original tune was lost, the current music was written by Ron Hynes.
- "Captain Wedderburn" is an adaptation of the Child Ballad No. 46, Captain Wedderburn's Courtship.

== Trivia ==
- The 2000 U.S. release on Rhino/Wea featured a different track order; "Can't Stop Falling" and "Demasduit Dream" were switched.
- The song "Consequence Free" was the theme for the Least I Could Do animated series trailer, a series currently in production
