= Bob Hallett =

Canadian musician and founding member of the Canadian folk rock band Great Big Sea

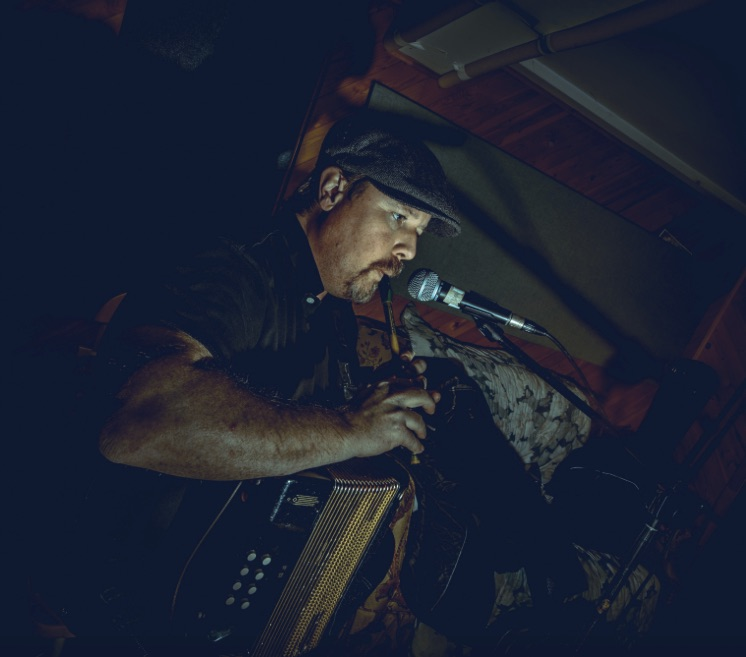
- Hallett at rehearsal with the Planks.
- Born: Robert Hallett; 1966 (age 59–60); St. John's, Newfoundland
- Occupations: Musician, Talent manager, Record producer, Author
- Known for: Great Big Sea (band member), Come From Away (music consultant)

Robert Hallett (born 1966) is a Canadian musician, author, producer, and entrepreneur, best known as a founding member of the Canadian folk rock band Great Big Sea (1993–2013).

He is a native of St. John's, Newfoundland, Hallett co-founded Great Big Sea in 1993, with Alan Doyle, Sean McCann, and Darrell Power. The band sold over a million and half records around the world, over a twenty-year period. Through his company, Kilbride Music, Hallett has managed bands and produced records, radio specials, and live concerts.

Hallett is involved in talent development within the Newfoundland and East Coast music industries, and has authored a career guidebook for aspiring musicians. He works with the producers of the Broadway musical Come From Away as a music consultant, and has also worked at the Stratford Festival as a composer and music director.

As an author he has written magazine articles, essays and books, including the memoir Writing Out The Notes. He is the owner of Erin's Pub and Tavola Restaurant in downtown St. John's. Hallett currently plays accordion and other instruments in the band Kelly Russell and the Planks; he has also been associated with The Once, The Dardanelles, Fabian James, and the Irish Descendants, in various capacities.

== Early life and education ==
Hallett attended Memorial University of Newfoundland, where he completed a Bachelor of Arts in English and History in 1989. The other members of Great Big Sea attended Memorial University at the same time, and together were named Alumni of the Year in 1999. Prior to becoming a full-time musician, Hallett served as Managing Editor of the Newfoundland Herald and as a Communications Officer with Employment and Immigration Canada.

== Career ==
=== Great Big Sea ===
A founding member of Great Big Sea, Hallett performed vocals, mandolin, mandola, bouzouki, banjo, fiddle, guitar, whistles, bagpipes, accordion, and concertina with the band. Hallett, Darrell Power, and Séan McCann began playing together in a Celtic band called Rankin Street in 1989, with Alan Doyle joining in 1993.

Rankin Street built a following playing at local St. John's pubs, including Bridgett's and Greensleeves, and released one recording on cassette titled "Rankin Street". As Great Big Sea, the group played its first official gig on March 11, 1993, opening for the Irish Descendants at Memorial University, and focusing on playing traditional instruments. Great Big Sea released nine albums between 1993 and 2010, including several platinum and gold titles.

Touring intensively, the band and band members gained acclaim across North America prior to retiring in 2013 following a 20th anniversary tour. Highlights include reaching the top ten of the Canadian RPM pop chart in 1997 with "When I'm Up (I Can't Get Down)", a cover of a song by the British folk group Oysterband; winning the Entertainer of the Year award at the East Coast Music Awards every year between 1996 and 2000;[5] and receiving nominations for several Juno Awards including Group of the Year in 1998, 2005, 2009, and 2011.

See Great Big Sea discography.

=== Come From Away ===
Since 2015, Hallett has served as the Newfoundland Music Consultant for the Tony Award-winning Broadway theater production Come from Away. The show is a musical with book, music, and lyrics by Irene Sankoff and David Hein; the Rock music-feel of the musical has been attributed to Hallett's contributions.

Set in the week following the September 11 attacks, the musical tells the true story of what transpired when 38 planes were ordered to land unexpectedly in the small town of Gander, Newfoundland and Labrador, as part of Operation Yellow Ribbon. At the 71st Tony Awards, the production was nominated for seven awards including Best Musical, Best Score, Best Book of a Musical and Best Featured Actress in a Musical for Jenn Colella, ultimately winning for Best Direction of a Musical. In November 2017, plans for a Mark Gordon Company feature film adaptation were announced.

=== Stratford Shakespeare Festival ===
In 2016, Hallett served as musical composer and arranger for the Stratford Festival production of Shakespeare's As You Like It, directed by Jillian Keiley. In this adaptation, the play was set in Newfoundland in the 1980s, and audience members were encouraged to participate in the performance, incorporating props that the audience selected when entering the lobby. All music was composed by Hallett and played by a roots band.

=== Author ===
Hallett is the author of four books.

- Writing Out the Notes, Hallett's reflections on life in the band Great Big Sea and the Canadian music industry
- The Ten - Most Decisive Battles on American Soil (juvenile nonfiction)
- The Ten - Greatest Pop Stars (juvenile nonfiction)
- The Art of Managing Your Career in Music and Sound Recording. A guide for musicians and recording artists, this book is part of the online learning curriculum offered by the Cultural Human Resources Council of Canada (HRDC)

=== Entrepreneur ===
==== Kilbride Music ====
Nominated for the East Coast Music Association Manager of the Year award in 2015, 2016, and 2017, Kilbride Music is a music management and production firm operated by Hallett and business partner Michelle Robertson.

==== Erin's Pub ====
With Chris Andrews (of the band Shanneyganock), Hallett co-owns Erin's Pub, a traditional Newfoundland bar known as a kitchen party place. The establishment was the first Irish pub in Newfoundland. It has also played a role in launching bands and was featured in a 2014 Cody Westman documentary (That Little Room - The Story Of Erin's Pub) that aired on all Air Canada flights in 2014.

== Awards and service ==
Great Big Sea won the Entertainer of the Year award at the East Coast Music Awards for every year between 1996 and 2000. In 2001, they decided not to submit their name for nomination in order to allow other bands to compete. They were nominated for several Juno Awards, including Group of the Year.

Hallett has served as a co-chair and board member to the East Coast Music Association and Awards.

He became the organization's executive director in September 2025 following a leadership search.

== In popular culture ==
In late 2005, Great Big Sea released its first podcast, with clips of the band bantering back and forth in the studio mixed with various songs by them and other artists. The Great Big Sea song "Oh Yeah"—written and performed by Doyle, McCann, Hallett, Hawsley Workman, and Jeen O'Brien—was featured in the opening credits of the Canadian Broadcasting Corporation show Republic of Doyle. Set and filmed in St. John's, Newfoundland, Republic of Doyle launched in 2010 as a new drama, with one of the largest budgets in CBC history.

In 2016, Hallett successfully campaigned to halt Walmart sales of Saint Patrick's Day T-shirts that featured a racial slur considered offensive to native Newfoundlanders.
