= Mary Mack (folk song) =

Scottish folk song

Mary Mack (also spelled Mari-Mac) is a Scottish folk song, and is also a patter song, often sung not only with a rapid to very rapid tempo but increasing toward the end.

== Recordings ==
Tommy Makem and Liam Clancy recorded a version on their 1977 double album "Makem & Clancy Concert," performed live at National Stadium Dublin. "Mary Mac" has long been a fixture of Richmond, Virginia band Carbon Leaf's live sets. A studio recording appears on their 2001 album Echo Echo and a live recording on their 2003 album 5 Alive!. Another recording was done by Great Big Sea on their 1995 album Up, which is very well-known throughout Canada. Another recording was done by the band Fiddler's Green on their 1998 album Spin Around, which was recorded in Los Angeles.

== Lyrics ==
There's a nice wee lass an her name is Mary Mack
Make no mistake, she's the miss I'm gonna take
There's a lot o other chaps who would get up on her track
But I'm thinking that they'll have to get up early.

Chorus:
Mary Mack's father's making Mary Mack marry me
My father's making me marry Mary Mack
An I'm going to marry Mary so my Mary can take care o' me
We'll aw be making merry when I marry Mary Mack

Chorus

This wee lass she has a lot of brass
She has a lot of gas, her father thinks I'm class
An I'd be a silly ass to let the matter pass
For her father thinks she suits me rather fairly.

Chorus

Now Mary an her mother gain an awful lot together
In fact you never see the one, or the one without the other
An the fellows often wonder if its Mary or her mother
Or the both o them together that I'm courting.

Chorus

Now the wedding day's on Wednesday an everything's arranged
Her name will soon be changed to mine, unless her mind be changed
An we're making the arrangements, faith, I'm just about deranged
For marriage is an awful undertaking.

Chorus

It's sure to be a grand affair an grander than a fair
A coach and pair for rich an poor an every pair that's there
We'll dine upon the finest fare, I'm sure to get my share
If I don't we'll all be very much mistaken.

Chorus

There are many renditions of this song: Here are the lyrics to another version, with mother instead of father in the chorus:

Chorus

Mary Mack's mother's making Mary Mack marry me,
My mother's making me marry Mary Mack.
I'm gonna marry Mary so my Mary will take care O' me,
We'll all be feeling merry when I marry Mary Mack.

Now there's a nice wee lass and her name is Mary Mack,
Make no mistake she's the girl I gonna take,
And a lot of other fella's would get upon her track,
but I'm thinking' they'll have to get up early.

Chorus

Now this wee lass she has a lot of cash,
She has a lot of brass...her father thinks I'm gas,
I'd be a silly ass to let the matter pass,
Her father thinks she suits me very fairly.

Chorus

Now Mary and her mother gang an awful lot together,
In fact you hardly ever see the one without the other,
And all the fella's wonder is it Mary or her mother,
Or both of them together that I'm courting'.

Chorus

Now the wedding' day 's on Wednesday and everything's arranged,
Her name will soon be changed to mine unless her mind be changed,
I'm making the arrangements I'm just about deranged
For marriage is an awful undertaking

Chorus
