= Something Beautiful (Great Big Sea album) =

Studio album by Great Big Sea
- Released: February 24, 2004 (Canada); March 9, 2004 (US)
- Genre: Folk
- Length: 42:08
- Label: Warner Music Canada
- Producer: Michael Phillip Wojewoda

Great Big Sea chronology
Sea of No Cares (2002)	Something Beautiful (2004)	The Hard and the Easy (2005)

Professional ratings
Review scores
Source	Rating
Allmusic	link

Something Beautiful (stylized Something Beautiful*) is the sixth studio album by Great Big Sea, released in Canada on February 24, 2004 and in the US on March 9, 2004. It is the first album the group has recorded without the contributions of former member Darrell Power. The album received five nominations for the 2005 ECMA's (East Coast Music Awards) including Single of the Year ("When I Am King"), Video of the Year ("When I Am King"), Pop Recording of the Year ("Something Beautiful"), Group of the Year, and Songwriter of the Year (Alan Doyle, "When I Am King"). The album is the band's fifth to debut in the Top 10 on Canadian sales charts.

== Track listing ==
1. "Shines Right Through Me" (Alan Doyle, Kalem Mahoney, Séan McCann) 3:18
2. "When I Am King" (Alan Doyle) 2:31
3. "Beat The Drum" (Calum MacDonald, Rory MacDonald) 3:09
4. "Something Beautiful" (Alan Doyle) 3:49
5. "Helmethead" (Bob Hallett) 2:47
6. "Summer" (Alan Doyle, Séan McCann) 3:25
7. "Sally Ann" (Alan Doyle) 2:12
8. "Somedays" (Séan McCann) 2:51
9. "Let It Go" (Alan Doyle, Blair Daly, Gordie Sampson) 3:11
10. "John Barbour" (Traditional, Arr. Alan Doyle, Séan McCann, Bob Hallett) 4:53
11. "Lucky Me" (Alan Doyle, Gordie Sampson) 3:54
12. "Love" (Séan McCann) 3:32
13. "Chafe's Ceilidh" (Traditional, Arr. Alan Doyle, Séan McCann, Bob Hallett) 2:33

== Song information ==
- "When I Am King" and "Shines Right Through Me" have been made into videos and have been released as radio singles. The video for "When I Am King" won Best Video of the Year at the ECMA's
- "John Barbour" is based on Child Ballad No. 100, Willie o Winsbury.
- "Beat The Drum" is a cover version of "Pride Of The Summer" by Scottish Gaelic band Runrig.
