= Consequence Free =

Single by Great Big Sea

from the album Turn
- Released: June 1999
- Genre: Folk music
- Length: 3:12
- Label: Warner Music Canada
- Songwriter(s): Alan Doyle; Séan McCann; Bob Hallett; Darrell Power
- Producer(s): Steve Berlin

Great Big Sea singles chronology
"How Did We Get From Saying 'I Love You'..." (1998)	"Consequence Free" (1999)	"Feel It Turn" (1999)

"Consequence Free" is a song recorded by Newfoundland folk band Great Big Sea. It was released in June 1999 as the lead single from their album Turn. It peaked at No. 7 on the Canadian RPM adult contemporary chart and at No. 18 on the Canadian RPM Top Singles.

== Chart performance ==
Chart (1999)	Peak position
Canadian RPM Adult Contemporary Tracks	7
Canadian RPM Top Singles	18
