= Great Big DVD =

Video by Great Big Sea
- Released: 2003
- Recorded: Ottawa Civic Centre in Ottawa, Ontario

Great Big DVD is a DVD compilation released by the band Great Big Sea in Canada and the US in 2003. It contains various live performances from concerts, music videos, and a documentary. The concert portion was filmed at the Ottawa Civic Centre in Ottawa, Ontario.

== Track listing ==
1. "Donkey Riding"
2. "When I'm Up"
3. "Sea of No Cares"
4. "Boston and St. John's"
5. "The Night Pat Murphy Died"
6. "Stumbling In"
7. "Jack Hinks"
8. "Goin' Up"
9. "General Taylor"
10. "Lukey"
11. "Clearest Indication"
12. "I'm a Rover"
13. "Everything Shines"
14. "Mari-Mac"
15. "Consequence Free"
16. "Ordinary Day"
17. "End of the World"
18. "Excursion Around the Bay"
19. "Fortune Set"
20. "The Old Black Rum"

== Bonus features ==
- 13 Music Videos
- 3 Karaoke Versions (Goin' Up, Mari-Mac, Ordinary Day)
- 28 Minute Documentary
- Home Movies
- Band Timeline
