= The Hard and the Easy =

The Hard and The Easy

Studio album by Great Big Sea
- Released: October 11, 2005 (Canada)
- Genre: Folk
- Length: 41:22
- Label: Warner Music Canada
- Producer: Alan Doyle, Sean McCann & Bob Hallett

Great Big Sea chronology
Something Beautiful* (2004)	The Hard and The Easy (2005)	Fortune's Favour (2008)

Professional ratings
Review scores
Source	Rating
Allmusic	3.5/5 stars

The Hard and The Easy is the seventh studio album by Great Big Sea. It was released on October 11, 2005 in Canada and October 25, 2005 in the US. It reached gold status by October 25, 2005.

The album is a compilation of traditional Newfoundland songs, many of which were collected together in the Gerald S. Doyle song books. Its title is derived from a line in the folk song "Tickle Cove Pond", which appears as the closing track on the album.

The album was nominated for Roots & Traditional Album of the Year by a group at the 2006 Juno Awards.

== Track listing ==
1. "Come And I Will Sing You (The Twelve Apostles)" (Traditional, Arranged Alan Doyle, Séan McCann, Bob Hallett) 3:42
2. "Old Polina" (Traditional, Arranged Alan Doyle, Séan McCann, Bob Hallett) 2:40
3. "The River Driver" (Traditional, Arranged Alan Doyle, Séan McCann, Bob Hallett) 3:03
4. "The Mermaid" (Phil Hillier, Arranged Alan Doyle, Séan McCann, Bob Hallett, lyrics by Shel Silverstein) 2:49
5. "Captain Kidd" (Traditional, Arranged Alan Doyle, Séan McCann, Bob Hallett) 2:51
6. "Graceful & Charming (Sweet Forget Me Not)" (Bobby Newcome, Arranged Alan Doyle, Séan McCann, Bob Hallett) 4:18
7. "Concerning Charlie Horse" (Omar Blondahl) 3:13
8. "Harbour LeCou" (Traditional, Arranged Alan Doyle, Séan McCann, Bob Hallett) 3:33
9. "Tishialuk Girls Set (Father's Jig / Buffet Double / Tishialuk Girls)" (Baxter Wareham, Rufus Guinchard, Charlie Lloyd) 3:27
10. "French Shore" (Lem Snow) 3:48
11. "Cod Liver Oil" (Johnny Burke, Arranged Alan Doyle, Séan McCann, Bob Hallett) 2:57
12. "Tickle Cove Pond" (Mark Walker) 5:01

== Song information ==
- "Come and I Will Sing You" is a variation on an English Christian folk song that has been around since early times, popular in the West Country. It is similar to the version known as "Green Grow the Rushes, O."
- "Captain Kidd" is about the infamous pirate William Kidd.
- After the album was released, the band discovered that "The Mermaid" was actually written by Shel Silverstein.
- "Graceful & Charming (Sweet Forget Me Not)" was actually composed by Bobby Newcome of Cincinnati, Ohio, in 1877.

== Additional information ==
The album offered through iTunes came with a digital copy of the booklet. In addition, a live version of "The Old Black Rum" was offered to those who signed up for the pre-order.

The CD version of the album came with a bonus DVD featuring back-stories, commentary and informal performances of many of the album tracks.

== See also ==
- List of Newfoundland songs
