= Great Big Sea (album) =

Studio album by Great Big Sea
- Released: August 1993 (Canada)
- Recorded: 1993
- Studio: Piper Stock Studios
- Genre: Folk
- Length: 38:49
- Label: NRA Productions LTD.
- Producers: Pat Janes; Great Big Sea

Great Big Sea chronology
| Great Big Sea (1993) | Up (1995) |

Great Big Sea is the debut album by Canadian folk-rock band Great Big Sea, released independently in 1993. The album sold 17,000 copies in Canada independently before it was reissued by Warner Music Canada when the band was signed with the label. The album was certified Gold in Canada in 2000.

== Track listing ==
1. "Great Big Sea/Gone By The Board" (Traditional Arranged Bob Hallett) 3:39
2. "Someday Soon" (Alan Doyle) 4:18
3. "Excursion Around The Bay" (Johnny Burke) 2:30
4. "What Are Ya' At?" (Alan Doyle) 3:12
5. "The Fisherman's Lament" (Séan McCann) 5:11
6. "I'se The B'y" (Traditional) 1:57
7. "Drunken Sailor" (Traditional) 2:54
8. "Irish Paddy/Festival Reel/Roger's Reel" (Traditional, Arranged Alan Doyle, Séan McCann, Bob Hallett, Darrell Power, Benoit / Guinchard) 4:20
9. "Time Brings" (Séan McCann) 4:31
10. "Jigs: Eavesdropper's/Both Meat & Drink/Off We Go" (Reavy, Traditional) 3:01
11. "Berry Picking Time" (Traditional) 3:20

== Song information ==
- "Great Big Sea/Gone By The Board" is one song that goes by two names.
- "Irish Paddy/Festival Reel/Roger's Reel" and "Jigs: Eavesdropper's/Both Meat & Drink/Off We Go" are each three separate folk songs that Great Big Sea arranged into a single track.
