= It's the End of the World as We Know It (And I Feel Fine) =

R.E.M. song from 1987

- Cover of the USA 7" release

Single by R.E.M.

from the album Document
- B-side: "Last Date"
- Released: November 16, 1987
- Recorded: 1987
- Studio: Sound Emporium (Nashville, Tennessee)
- Genre: Alternative rock; post-punk
- Length: 4:04 (album version) 3:29 (single version) 4:28 (5.1 version)
- Label: I.R.S.
- Songwriters: Bill Berry; Peter Buck; Mike Mills; Michael Stipe
- Producers: Scott Litt; R.E.M.

R.E.M. singles chronology
"The One I Love" (1987)	"It's the End of the World as We Know It (And I Feel Fine)" (1987)	"Finest Worksong" (1988)
"Radio Song" (1991)	"It's the End of the World as We Know It (And I Feel Fine)" (1991)	"Drive" (1992)

"It's the End of the World as We Know It (And I Feel Fine)" is a song by American rock band R.E.M., which first appeared on their 1987 album, Document. It was released as the album's second single in November 1987 by I.R.S. Records, reaching No. 69 in the US Billboard Hot 100 and later reaching No. 39 on the UK Singles Chart on its re-release in December 1991.

== Lyrics ==
The track is known for its quick-flying, seemingly stream of consciousness rant with many diverse references, such as a quartet of individuals with the initials "L.B.", namely Leonard Bernstein, Leonid Brezhnev, Lenny Bruce, and Lester Bangs. In a 1990s interview with Musician magazine, R.E.M.'s lead singer Michael Stipe claimed that the "L.B." references came from a dream he had in which he found himself at a party surrounded by famous people who all shared those initials. "The words come from everywhere," Stipe explained to Q in 1992. "I'm extremely aware of everything around me, whether I am in a sleeping state, awake, dream-state or just in day to day life, so that ended up in the song along with a lot of stuff I'd seen when I was flipping TV channels. It's a collection of streams of consciousness."

The song originated from a previously unreleased song called "PSA" ("Public Service Announcement"); the two are very similar in melody and tempo. "PSA" was later reworked and released as a single in 2003, under the title "Bad Day". In an interview with Guitar World magazine published in November 1996, R.E.M. guitarist Peter Buck agreed that "End of the World" was in the tradition of Bob Dylan's "Subterranean Homesick Blues".

The song was included on the 2001 Clear Channel memorandum of songs thought to be "lyrically questionable" after the September 11 attacks.

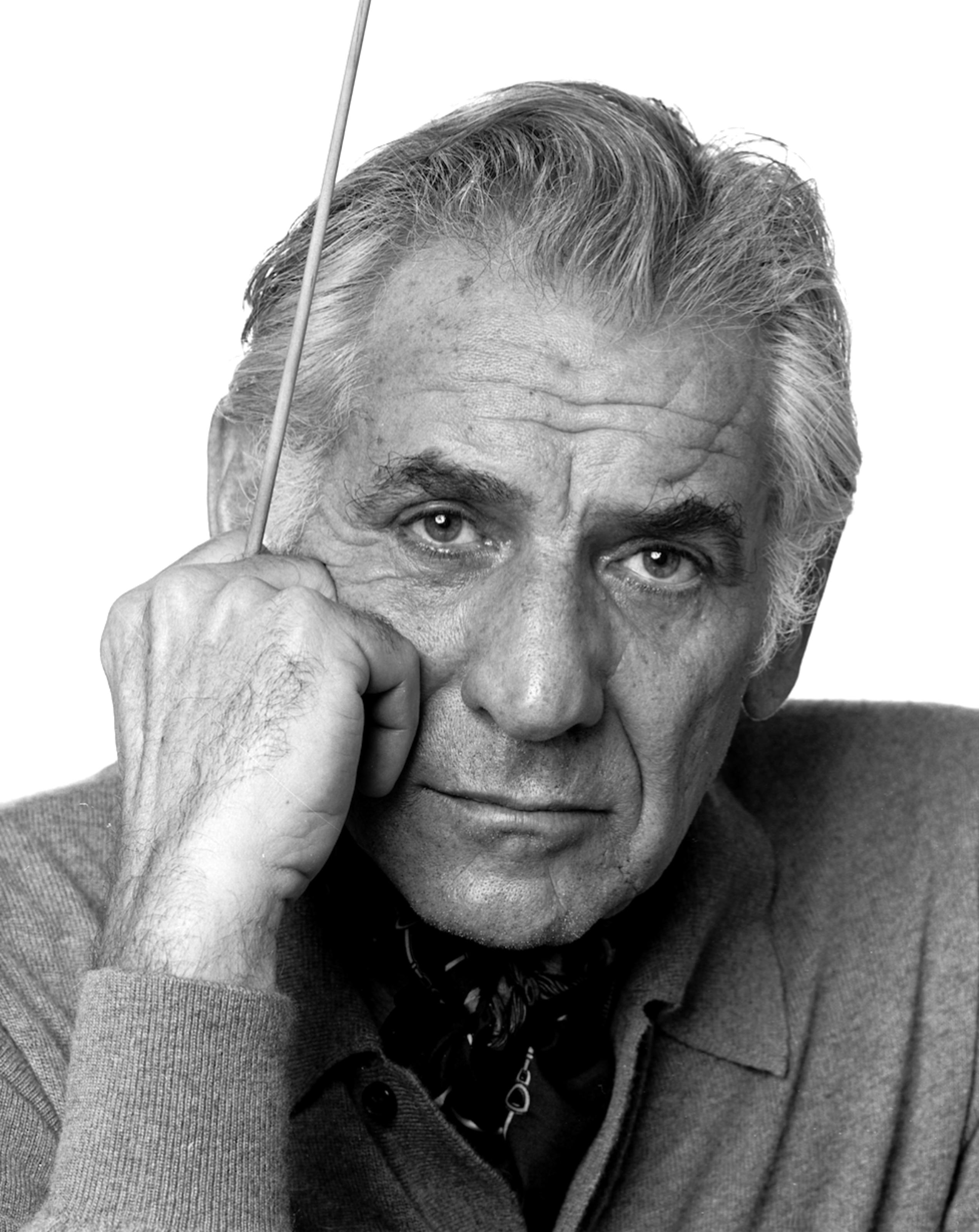
Leonard Bernstein

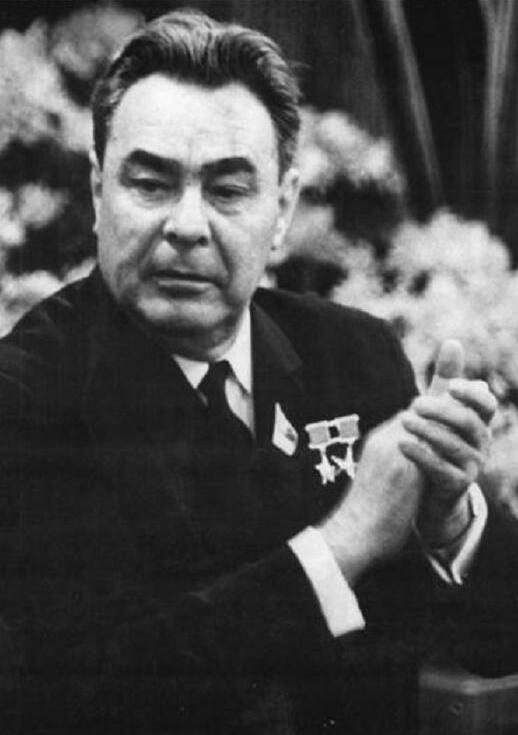
Leonid Brezhnev

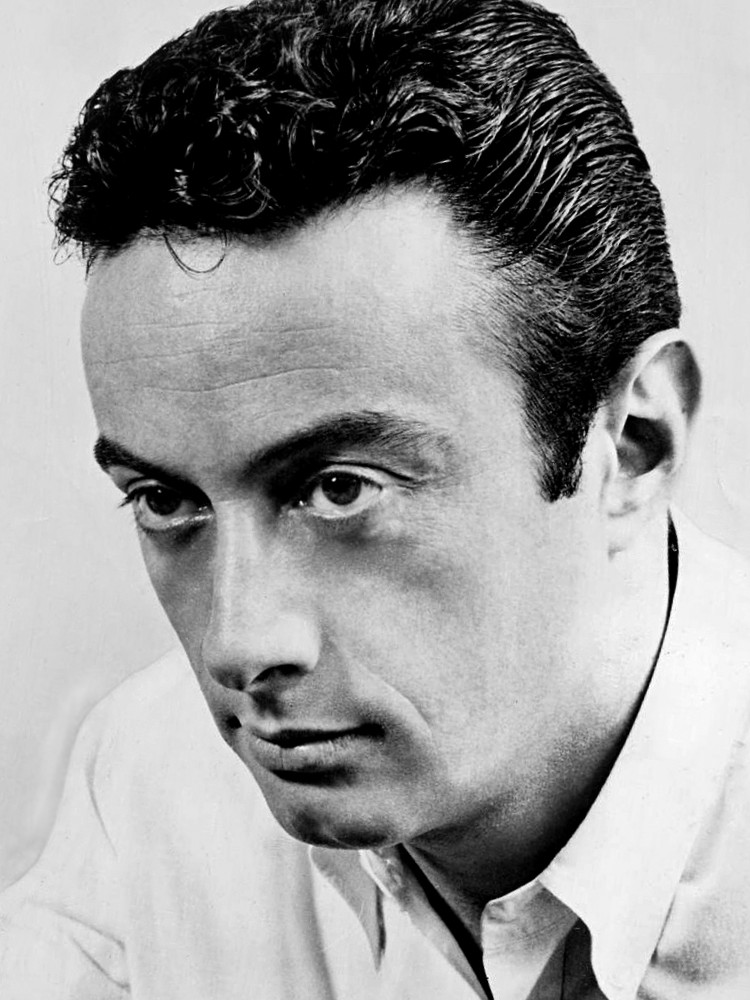
Lenny Bruce

== Reception ==
Cash Box said that "Overdriven guitars push this blazing rock ode to the modern calamity. A high energy AOR smash with R.E.M.'s unique stamp of disapproval."

== Chart performance ==
In 1992, the song was played repeatedly for a 24-hour period (with brief promos interspersed) to introduce the new format for WENZ 107.9 FM "The End", a radio station in Cleveland, Ohio. When the station underwent a new format change to mainstream urban on May 14, 1999, they again played the song in a 24-hour loop. There was a documentary film made about the station entitled The End of the World As We Knew It, released in 2009, which featured many of the former staffers and jocks.

The song was featured in several satirical videos on YouTube, in connection with the prediction of radio pastor Harold Camping of Family Radio, that the world would end on May 21, 2011; the song was later played on a loop following the sale of Family Radio station WKDN (now WKVP) in Philadelphia prior to a format change on that station. Also, before the supposed Mayan apocalypse on December 21, 2012, sales for the song jumped from 3,000 to 19,000 copies for the week. Alternative radio station CFEX-FM in Calgary, Canada, stunted by playing the song all day on December 21, 2012, interspersed with "Get to Know a Mayan" and "Apocalypse Survival Tips" segments.

Amid the global COVID-19 pandemic, the song received an increase in downloads and streaming in March 2020 alongside other apocalypse- and sickness-themed songs. Online downloads of the song rose 184 percent, while streams rose 48 percent.

== Music video ==
The music video was directed by James Herbert, who worked with the band on several other videos in the late 1980s. It depicts a teenage skateboarder (Noah Ray) in a cluttered room of an abandoned, half-collapsed farmhouse. As he rummages through the junk, including several band pictures and flyers, he shows off various toys and items to the camera and plays with a dog that wanders into the house. As the video ends, he removes his shirt and starts performing skateboard tricks while still inside the room.

According to Herbert, the dog's appearance in the video was entirely unscripted, something he was quite happy with. Over three decades after the video's release, he said, "I wanted the distortions and the magic that can come just out of spontaneous combustion."

== Track listing ==
=== Initial release ===
- 7": IRS IRM 145 (UK):
1. "It's the End of the World as We Know It (And I Feel Fine)" – 2:59
2. "This One Goes Out" (live acoustic version of "The One I Love") – 4:19
- 7": IRS IRS-53220 (US); cassette: IRS IRSC-53220:
1. "It's the End of the World as We Know It (And I Feel Fine)" – 3:29
2. "Last Date" (Floyd Cramer cover) – 2:13

The single edit on US & Canadian releases removes about 23 seconds of audio at 0:21. Two edits were released, the first with "you" before "vitriolic, patriotic" and the second with "height" (possibly "high").

- 12": IRS IRMT 145 (UK):
1. "It's the End of the World as We Know It (And I Feel Fine)" – 4:04
2. "This One Goes Out" (live acoustic version of "The One I Love") – 4:19
3. "Maps and Legends" (live acoustic)
- 12" Promo: IRS 7363 (US):
1. "It's the End of the World as We Know It (And I Feel Fine)" – 4:04
2. "Disturbance at the Heron House (Live from cassette 5.24.87 McCabes Guitar Shop)" – 3:41

=== Re-issue ===
- CD: IRS DIRMT 180:
1. "It's the End of the World as We Know It (And I Feel Fine)" – 4:04
2. "Radio Free Europe" – 4:03
3. "The One I Love" (Live Acoustic) – 4:19
- CD: IRS DIRMX 180:
1. "It's the End of the World as We Know It (And I Feel Fine)" – 4:04
2. "Radio Free Europe" (Hib-Tone version) – 3:46
3. "White Tornado" – 1:59
4. "Last Date" – 2:13
- "7: IRS IRM 180; cassette: IRS DIRMC 180:
1. "It's the End of the World as We Know It (And I Feel Fine)"
2. "Radio Free Europe"

== Personnel ==
R.E.M.

- Bill Berry – drums, percussion, backing vocals
- Peter Buck – guitar
- Mike Mills – bass guitar, piano, backing vocals
- Michael Stipe – lead vocals

== Charts ==
Chart (1987/1991)	Peak Position
France (SNEP)	12
Ireland (IRMA)	22 (Note: Only charted in 1991 after the song's re-release.)
Italy (Italian Singles Chart)	16
UK Singles (OCC)	39 (Note: The single originally reached No. 87 in the UK. It reached No. 39 in 1991 upon re-release.)
UK Airplay (Music Week)	25
US Billboard Hot 100	69
US Mainstream Rock Tracks (Billboard)	16
US Cash Box Top 100	84

Chart (2020)	Peak Position
Hot Rock & Alternative Songs	4
UK Singles Download Chart	46

== Certifications ==
Sales certifications for "It's the End of the World as We Know It (And I Feel Fine)"
Region	Certification	Certified units/sales
New Zealand (RMNZ)	Gold	15,000^{‡}
United Kingdom (BPI)	Gold	400,000^{‡}
^{‡} Sales+streaming figures based on certification alone.

== Cover versions ==
- Newfoundland folk-rockers Great Big Sea covered the song on their 1997 album Play under the title "End of the World". Their version is a minute and a half shorter than R.E.M.'s, yet still contains all the verses (the faster time is achieved primarily by their increasing the tempo). It peaked at #24 on the Canadian Singles Chart on the week of April 6, 1998.
- On January 1, 2000, pop rock band No Doubt covered the song on MTV's New Year's Eve special shortly after midnight.
- In 2011, Chris Carrabba of Dashboard Confessional covered this song on his album Covered In The Flood.
