= Omar Blondahl =

Canadian musician (1923–1993)

- Also known as: Sagebrush Sam
- Born: Omar Blondahl; February 6, 1923; Wynyard, Saskatchewan
- Origin: St. John's, Newfoundland and Labrador
- Died: December 11, 1993 (aged 70) Vancouver
- Genre: Newfoundland music
- Years active: 1955-1964

Omar Blondahl (6 February 1923 – 11 December 1993), also known as "Sagebrush Sam", was a musician known for his renditions of Newfoundland folk music. After discovering the musical tradition of the provence in 1955, Blondahl began recording many traditional songs from the region. He has also been credited with popularizing the guitar as an accompanying instrument in the region. He has also been credited with popularizing the folk music of the region in general.

== Early life ==
Blondahl was born in Wynyard, Saskatchewan of Icelandic parents. He grew up in Winnipeg, Manitoba. As a child, he didn't speak English. In his youth, Blondahl studied various instruments, including the violin, piano, and guitar. He also practiced singing. In addition to music, he did work on the radio as an announcer, a DJ, and a performer in radio dramas.In 1940, Blondahl joined the military. He served from 1941 to 1942, at which time he was medically discharged. He served again in 1945.

After leaving the military initially, in 1943, Blondahl began working at radio stations in Western Canada full-time. In 1947, he moved to Edmonton, Alberta, where he began working for CFRN. In addition to this, he also played fiddle in the bands of Ameen "King" Ganam and Gaby Haas. In 1951, he moved to Hollywood to pursue a career there, but two years later, he was living in Portland, Oregon, where he played fiddle and sang in Ernie Lindell's New England Barn Dance Jamboree.

== Career ==
In 1955, Blondahl left Ernie Lindell's band. Wanting to visit his father's grave in Iceland, he crossed the country. His journey came to a stop in St. John's, Newfoundland, where he settled in order to raise money to continue the trip. He sought out work at VOCM. However, when the station manager learned that he was a folk singer, he showed Blondahl a copy of the newly published third edition of the Gerald S. Doyle songbook. Blondahl was unfamiliar, but took to the material quickly. When he learned that the material in the songbook wasn't commonly recorded, he began performing his own versions.

Several months after settling in St. John's, Blondahl's music had proven to be a hit locally. He soon released his first album, which was quickly followed by a second, and later, a third. In total, Blondahl recorded 50 of the 75 songs from the Doyle songbook. In addition to that, he travelled across Newfoundland to collect other songs. Some of the songs he performed were sent in by listeners of his radio shows. He also performed the songs of Burl Ives.

In 1959, Blondahl left VOCM for CJON. After this move, he would release his fourth album. Also while at CJON, he recorded a number of local advertisements based on his folk music. In the early 1960s, he released two final albums. In 1964, he published a songbook of the songs he had performed for radio and recorded, which included traditional Newfoundland folk music in addition to original compositions. After the release of the songbook, Blondahl retired.

== Personal life ==
Following his retirement, Blondahl retreated from public life. In the eyes of many, including his family, he disappeared. Blondahl died in Vancouver, British Columbia on December 11, 1993 at the age of 70.

== See also ==
- List of Newfoundland songs
