= Up (Great Big Sea album) =

Studio album by Great Big Sea
- Released: September 12, 1995 (Canada)
- Recorded: 1995
- Studio: The Nickel and The Sound Hole
- Genre: Folk, folk rock
- Length: 51:11
- Label: Warner Music Canada
- Producer: Danny Greenspoon

Great Big Sea chronology
Great Big Sea (1993)	Up (1995)	Play (1997)

Singles from Up
- 1. "Fast as I Can" Released: 1996; 2. "Goin' Up" Released: 1996

Professional ratings
Review scores
Source	Rating
Allmusic	link

Up is the second studio album by Canadian band Great Big Sea released on September 12, 1995. The album is certified 4× platinum in Canada, and is Great Big Sea's best-selling album.

== Track listing ==
No.	Title	Writer(s)	Length
1.	"Run Runaway" (Slade cover)	Noddy Holder, Jim Lea	2:51
2.	"Goin' Up"	Alan Doyle	3:12
3.	"Fast As I Can"	Doyle	4:11
4.	"Mari-Mac"		2:33
5.	"Dancing With Mrs. White"		2:07
6.	"Something To It"	Séan McCann	2:27
7.	"Buying Time"	Bob Hallett, McCann	3:07
8.	"Lukey"		3:10
9.	"The Old Black Rum"	Hallett	2:29
10.	"The Chemical Worker's Song (Process Man)"	Ron Angel	2:41
11.	"Wave Over Wave"	Jim Payne, Janice Spence	3:49
12.	"Billy Peddle"		2:46
13.	"Nothing Out Of Nothing"	McCann	2:36
14.	"The Jolly Butcher"		3:15
15.	"Rant and Roar"		2:40
Total length:			51:11

== Singles ==
- "Going Up" peaked at #70 on the Canadian Singles Chart.
- "Fast As I Can" peaked at #50 on the Canadian Singles Chart.
