= When I'm Up (I Can't Get Down) =

Single by Great Big Sea

from the album Play
- Released: May 1997
- Genre: Folk music
- Length: 3:24
- Label: Warner Music Canada
- Songwriter(s): Ian Telfer; Alan Prosser; John Jones
- Producer(s): Danny Greenspoon

Great Big Sea singles chronology
"Goin' Up" (1996)	"When I'm Up (I Can't Get Down)" (1997)	"Ordinary Day" (1997)

"When I'm Up (I Can't Get Down)" is a song written by English folk rock group Oysterband and later made famous in Canada by Newfoundland folk rock band Great Big Sea. It first appeared as track 1 on Oysterband's 1993 album Holy Bandits. It was released in May 1997 as the lead single from Great Big Sea's Play. It peaked at No. 13 on the Canadian RPM adult contemporary chart and at No. 6 on the Canadian RPM Top Singles, making it their highest peaking song on the Top Singles chart.

== Chart performance ==
=== Weekly charts ===
Chart (1997)	Peak position
Canadian RPM Top Singles	6
Canadian RPM Adult Contemporary	13

=== Year-end charts ===
Chart (1997)	Position
Canada Top Singles (RPM)	62
