= Sea of No Cares =

Studio album by Great Big Sea
- Released: February 19, 2002 (Canada)
- Genre: Folk rock
- Length: 44:38
- Label: Warner Music Canada
- Producer: Peter Prilesnik

Great Big Sea chronology
Road Rage (2000)	Sea of No Cares (2002)	Something Beautiful (2004)

Professional ratings
Review scores
Source	Rating
Allmusic	2.5/5 stars

Sea of No Cares is the fifth studio album by Great Big Sea, released on February 19, 2002, in Canada and on February 26 in the United States. The album is platinum certified (100,000 copies sold is platinum status in Canada), and won five East Coast Music Awards for the band (Album of the Year, Group of the Year, Entertainer of the Year, Video of the Year and Pop Artist of the Year).

== Track listing ==
1. "Sea Of No Cares" (Alan Doyle, Séan McCann, Chris Trapper) 3:41
2. "Penelope" (Chris Hynes) 2:45
3. "Clearest Indication" (Alan Doyle, Séan McCann, Chris Trapper) 4:14
4. "Scolding Wife" (Traditional Arranged By Alan Doyle, Séan McCann, Bob Hallett, Darrell Power) 3:09
5. "Stumbling In" (Alan Doyle) 3:20
6. "A Boat Like Gideon Brown" (Frank Dwyer, writer, Arranged Alan Doyle, Séan McCann, Bob Hallett, Darrell Power) 2:56
7. "Widow In The Window" (Alan Doyle, Séan McCann, Chris Trapper) 5:22
8. "French Perfume" (Bob Hallett) 3:06
9. "Yarmouth Town" (Arranged Alan Doyle, Séan McCann, Bob Hallett, Darrell Power) 2:34
10. "Barque In The Harbour" (Arranged Alan Doyle, Séan McCann, Bob Hallett, Darrell Power) 3:45
11. "Own True Way" (Alan Doyle, Séan McCann, Chris Trapper) 3:53
12. "Fortune" (Arranged By Alan Doyle, Séan McCann, Bob Hallett, Darrell Power) 2:53

== Song information ==
- "Sea of No Cares", "Clearest Indication" and "Stumbling In" have been made into videos and have been released as radio singles.
- "Clearest Indication" refers to Newfoundland's confederation with Canada.
- "French Perfume" is about smuggling rum and other things from the French island of St. Pierre to the Burin Peninsula. More specifically, it tells the dark story of a "bold young smuggler" who haunts the rocks that the Mounties drove him into.
