= Lukey's Boat =

Newfoundland folk song

"Lukey's Boat" (Roud 1828) is a comical folk song originating from the east coast of Newfoundland.

== Synopsis ==
There are many minor variations of the song, depending on the singer. However, it is essentially about the characteristics of Lukey's titular boat as well as his fishing gear. The last few stanzas usually depict Lukey returning home to find his wife dead and buried, but he does not grieve her death as he'll "have another in the spring of the year."

== History and composition ==
Folklorist Elizabeth Bristol Greenleaf observed that Lukey's Boat is in the same metre as The Maid of Amsterdam, which suggests that it may have derived from a sea shanty.

There is a tradition in the Newfoundland town of Wesleyville that Lukey's Boat was written and composed by Virtue Kean (née Hann), the wife of Captain Job Kean. She is said to have written the song to tease local Wesleyville resident Lukey Gaulton during a community event at the Methodist Church Hall. Supposedly, Gaulton then retaliated by adding a verse making light of Kean's hypochondria.

Lukey's Boat is referenced in George Allan England's Vikings of the Ice (1924), where it is sung by master watch Joe Stirge of the S/S Terra Nova. England stated that the crew of the Terra Nova credited Stirge with writing the song. He also noted that Stirge's rendition was seemingly endless and continued for about 57 verses.

The song was later documented by Greenleaf in 1929, who had heard it sung by various residents of Twillingate. The lyrics and music were first printed in full in Helen Creighton's collection Ballads from Nova Scotia (1932), although it was rendered as "Loakie's Boat." Creighton's informants claimed that the song was about a man from Lunenburg, Nova Scotia. In 1940, Gerald S. Doyle collected the song for the second edition of his Old-Time Songs and Poetry of Newfoundland.

== Recordings ==
The song's popularity increased when Great Big Sea covered it for their 1995 album Up. It was subsequently recorded by The Chieftains featuring Great Big Sea for the 1998 album Fire in the Kitchen as well as by Fiddler's Green for their 2007 album Drive Me Mad!. The Cornish group Fisherman's Friends included the song on their 2024 album titled All Aboard.
