= Séan McCann (musician) =

Séan McCann CM
- McCann in 2012.

Background information
- Born: 22 May 1967 (age 59); Carbonear, Newfoundland and Labrador, Canada
- Origin: Gull Island, Newfoundland, Canada
- Genres: Folk rock
- Occupation: Musician
- Instruments: Vocals, acoustic guitar, bodhran, tin whistle
- Formerly of: Great Big Sea
- Spouse: Andrea Aragon
- Website: seanmccannsings.com

Séan McCann CM (born 22 May 1967) is a Canadian singer and musician who formerly played with Great Big Sea.

== Life ==
He was born to Anita and Edward McCann. His mother was born in Northern Bay and his father in Gull Island. When he was a child, his family moved to St. John's. He was raised Roman Catholic. He is married and has 2 sons. He now lives in Manotick, a suburb of Ottawa, Ontario.

== Career ==
McCann has released 5 solo works (Lullabies for Bloodshot Eyes, Son of a Sailor, Help Your Self, You Know I Love You, and There's a Place).

He announced plans to stop touring with Great Big Sea, which he co-founded, at the end of December 2013.

In June 2016, McCann released the folk song "Proud (To Be a Canadian)" for free online in partnership with the Canadian Red Cross to benefit victims of the Fort McMurray wildfires.

In November 2017, McCann organized a benefit songwriter's circle at the Algonquin Commons Theatre in Ottawa with Joel Plaskett, Sarah Harmer, and Jeremy Fisher to raise money to purchase guitars for veterans suffering from PTSD and other mental-health issues.

He was awarded the Order of Canada in 2019. His memoir One Good Reason: A Memoir of Addiction and Recovery, Music and Love, was released in 2020.

== Albums ==
- Lullabies for the Bloodshot Eyes (2010)
- Son of a Sailor (2011)
- Help Your Self (2014)
- You Know I Love You (2015)
- There's a Place (2017)
- Shantyman (2021)
- Great Big Songbook: Live in Ottawa 2023 (2023)
