= Great Big Sea =

Canadian folk rock band

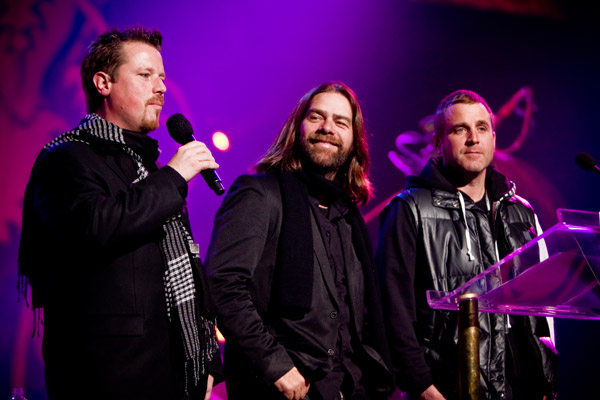
- Great Big Sea in 2009

Background information
- Origin: St. John's, Newfoundland and Labrador, Canada
- Genres: Celtic rock; folk rock
- Years active: 1993–2013
- Labels: WEA; Redeye; Sire; Zoë
- Past members: Alan Doyle; Bob Hallett; Murray Foster (supporting); Kris MacFarlane (supporting); Séan McCann; Darrell Power

Great Big Sea was a Canadian folk rock band from Newfoundland and Labrador, best known for performing energetic rock interpretations of traditional Newfoundland folk songs including sea shanties, which draw from the island's 500-year Irish, Scottish, and Cornish heritage. The band was very successful in Canada, with eleven of their albums being certified Gold in the country, including four being certified Platinum and two achieving multi-platinum certifications. Between 1996 and 2016, Great Big Sea was the sixteenth best-selling Canadian artist in Canada and the sixth best-selling Canadian band in Canada.

While it has been confirmed that the band has officially retired, former members Alan Doyle and Séan McCann have continued performing in their own solo careers typically including music from Great Big Sea in their setlists.

== History ==
=== Beginnings ===
The band played its first official concert on March 11, 1993, opening for The Irish Descendants at Memorial University of Newfoundland in St. John's, Newfoundland. The founding band members included Alan Doyle (vocals, guitar, bouzouki, mandolin), Séan McCann (vocals, bodhrán, guitar, tin whistle), Darrell Power (vocals, bass, guitar, bones), and Bob Hallett (vocals, fiddle, accordion, mandolin, concertina, bouzouki, whistles, bagpipes).

Power, McCann and Hallett had already been playing together in another band. In the winter of 1989, the band, a six-piece with guitar, bass, fiddle, accordion and mandolin played its first show at the Memorial University's winter carnival talent show under the name "Newfoundland Republican Army" or NRA, and won first prize. The band's only other appearance as NRA was later that winter at the university "Grad House". The band then dropped the fiddler, accordion player and the name.

The band found its new name as original bassist Jeff Scott rented an apartment on Rankin Street, St. John's, where the members first met and discussed the formation of the band. As a four-piece, the band first appeared as "Rankin Street" at a little pub in downtown St. John's called "The Rose and Thistle", playing for $100 and beer. They played through Sean McCann's stereo system, as renting a PA would have cost more than the night's earnings. Susan Hickey (guitar and vocals) left the band months later to attend school in Halifax and was replaced by Darrell Power. The band gained much popularity playing such local pubs as Bridget's and Greensleeves. In 1991 Jeff Scott was replaced by Jackie St. Croix on bass. The band released one recording on cassette titled "Rankin Street".

According to Doyle, Rankin Street owned a PA system and he owned a van, which made Great Big Sea "a match made in heaven." They toured nearly constantly for the band's first several years, sometimes traveling as many as 300 days a year.

In 1997, the band reached the top ten of the Canadian RPM pop chart with "When I'm Up (I Can't Get Down)", a cover of a song by the British folk group Oysterband. They performed at the 1999 Stardust Picnic festival at Historic Fort York, Toronto.

The band won the Entertainer of the Year award at the East Coast Music Awards for every year between 1996 and 2000. In 2001, they decided not to submit their name for nomination in order to allow other bands to compete. They have also been nominated for several Juno Awards, including Group of the Year in 1998, 2005, 2009, and 2011.

=== The 2000s ===
Power retired from Great Big Sea in 2003 to spend more time with his family and friends. Supporting members of the band include Canadian freelance drummer Kris MacFarlane (2002) (drums, accordion, guitar, backing vocals) and Murray Foster (2003, formerly of the band Moxy Früvous) (bass, backing vocals).

In the 2000 Canadian Federal Election, controversy occurred when Stockwell Day and the Canadian Alliance used the band's hit single, "Ordinary Day", at a rally without their permission. The band noted that this was a copyright violation and ordered that Day cease using the song for campaigning purposes.

Great Big Sea's first concert DVD and videos collection, the Great Big DVD, saw release in Canada and the United States in 2003 and Europe in 2004.

In late 2005, the band released its long-awaited "traditional" album, The Hard and the Easy, on which they recorded their favourite Newfoundland party songs. The title of the album comes from a line of the song "Tickle Cove Pond", one of two songs on the album about a horse falling through ice.

Also in late 2005, Great Big Sea released its first podcast, with clips of the band bantering back and forth in the studio mixed with various songs by them and other artists. They have since released several podcasts.

On February 9, 2006, the band's tour bus tipped on its side into a ditch on the Trans-Canada Highway about 80 kilometres east of Vancouver near Surrey. The bus went on its side (right side) right beside the commercial weigh scales. As traffic backed up as far as Chilliwack, British Columbia, RCMP started to re-route traffic through the weigh scales. Their driver suffered minor head injuries, but everyone in the band was unhurt. The band went on to continue their tour including their performance that evening at The Centre in Vancouver for Performing Arts.

On November 21, 2006, the band released their second concert DVD, Courage & Patience & Grit, recorded in Belleville, Ontario. It is also the second release by the band to be titled by a line from their 2005 song, "Tickle Cove Pond".

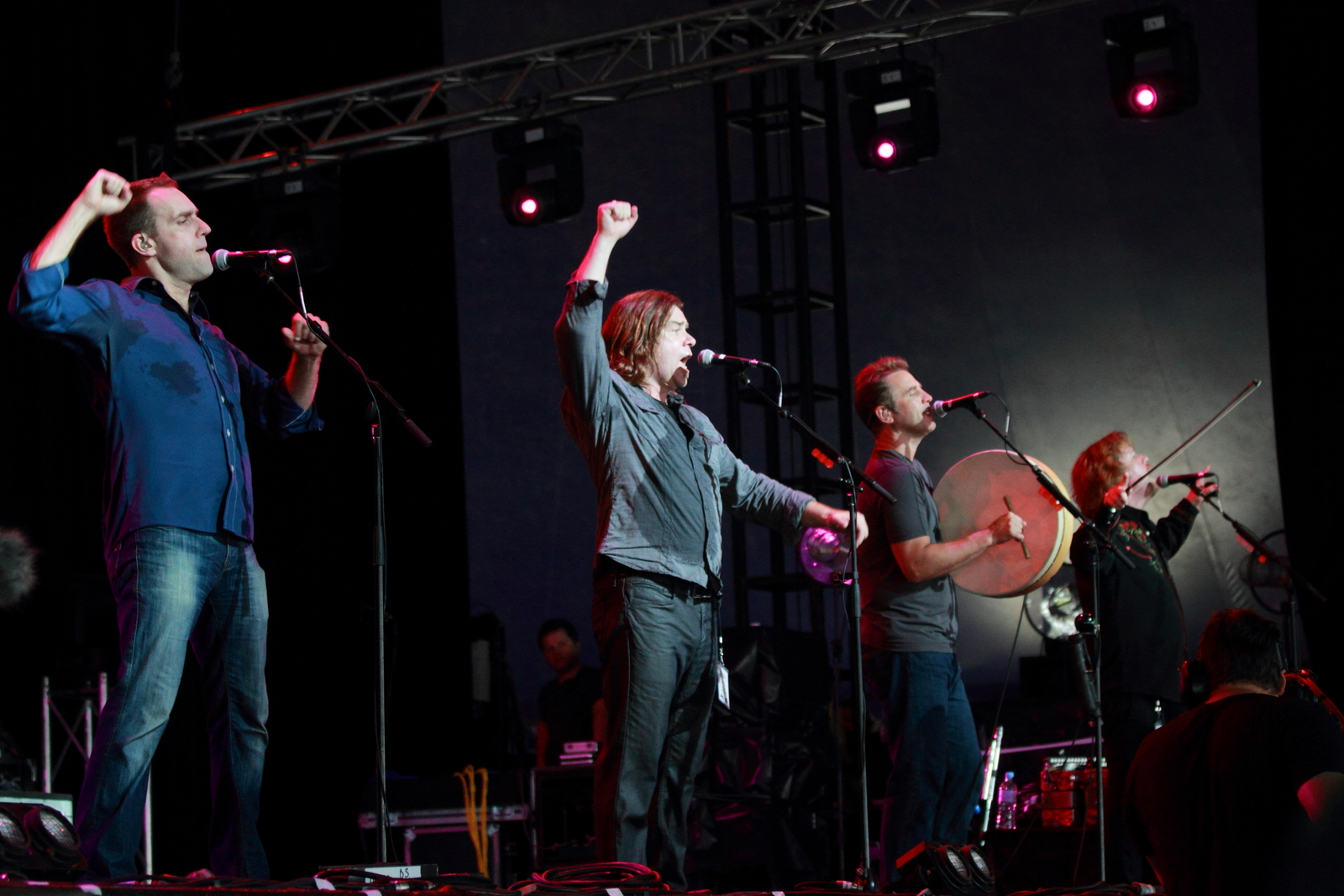
Great Big Sea at Byron Bay Bluesfest in Australia, in April 2012.

=== Later career ===
On June 13, 2007, the band announced they would return to the studio with producer Hawksley Workman. On March 14, 2008, the band announced that the title of the new album would be Fortune's Favour, borrowing a phrase from one of the songs on the album, "England". Prior to the release, a few of the songs that were eventually included on the album were played at live concerts, including "Love Me Tonight", "Walk on the Moon" "The Rocks of Merasheen", "Straight To Hell", and "Oh Yeah". On April 17, 2008, the band's website announced that the first single from Fortune's Favour would be "Walk on the Moon". People who pre-ordered the album from the band's official website were also treated to exclusive digital downloads of the songs "Belong (A Capella)" and "Gallow's Pole". The album was officially released on June 24, 2008 across all of North America.

On February 23, 2010, band member Séan McCann released his debut solo album Lullabies for Bloodshot Eyes to pleasing critical success. The nine track collection was recorded over the course of several months at GreatBigStudio in St. John's.

On July 13, 2010, Great Big Sea released their new album Safe Upon the Shore in North America. Alan's "From the Road" blog on the band's website, originally confirmed its production in an April posting, speaking also of the album's subsequent release in July. "Nothing But A Song" is the first single off the bands' ninth studio recording, with a subsequent tour kicking off at the end of the summer 2010.

The Canadian television series Republic of Doyle uses Great Big Sea's "Oh Yeah" as its theme song. Great Big Sea also did the theme song for Pirates: Adventures in Art.

Great Big Sea appeared on "It's Friday", a song by Dean Brody on his 2012 album Dirt.

Great Big Sea announced a 'greatest hits' album titled XX in October 2012, accompanied by a 20th anniversary tour with 32 dates in 28 cities across the US and Canada which kicked off on March 5, 2013, in Los Angeles and finished in St. John's on April 23, 2013.

=== McCann's departure ===
In 2013, McCann announced that he would be leaving the band at the end of the XX tour, much to the dismay of his bandmates.

In an interview with Bob Mersereau for the CBC, McCann discussed his life changes. "I stopped drinking two and a half years ago, I've decided to leave the band I've been in for 20 years. I'm 46 years old, and I've decided to make ...changes."

In 2020, McCann coauthored a memoir with his wife, Andrea Aragon, titled One Good Reason that discusses his early life, battle with addiction and how this affected his life in the band. In it, McCann says that struggling to maintain his new sobriety he told his bandmates in January 2013 that XX would be his last tour with the band, but the rest of the band and its management refused to announce this publicly. Finally, in November 2013 with XX almost over, McCann announced his departure himself in a tweet, feeling that the fans needed to know. While largely vilified by Great Big Sea fans with little said by the band or management to counter this view, McCann claims he was devastated by how Great Big Sea ended and wishes it could have gone differently.

=== Retirement ===
On November 5, 2015, Alan Doyle was quoted in an interview with Christopher Tessmer of the Regina Leader-Post, "We're all struggling to define what the status of Great Big Sea is right now. As most people know, at the end of 2013 — after our 20th Anniversary tour — Sean (McCann) quit and left the band. We spent a length of time — a year or so — to find an amicable way that Bob (Hallett) and I could continue without him. We couldn't, so we came to the realization that we didn’t want to go on like that. We don't want to fight for the spoils of it. For the lack of a better term, the band is now happily retired."

On February 27, 2017, Doyle was quoted in an interview with Jason Setnyk of the Cornwall Seeker, "Of course (we're still friends). Sean, Bob, Darrell, and myself still own the publishing. Sean doesn't live in Newfoundland anymore. We don't talk as much as we once did, but he seems to be doing really well and great, and good luck to him."

=== Charity work ===
Great Big Sea was a member of the Canadian charity Artists Against Racism and worked with them on a radio PSA.

== Discography ==
- Great Big Sea (1993)
- Up (1995)
- Play (1997)
- Turn (1999)
- Sea of No Cares (2002)
- Something Beautiful (2004)
- The Hard and the Easy (2005)
- Fortune's Favour (2008)
- Safe Upon the Shore (2010)
- XX (2012)

== See also ==
- Canadian rock
- List of bands from Canada
- Music of Canada
- Music of Newfoundland and Labrador
