= List of Newfoundland songs =

This is a list of songs associated with the Canadian island of Newfoundland.

== Songs with an unknown composer/lyricist ("Traditional") ==
- "A Great Big Sea Hove In Long Beach"
- "Bake Apple Time in Newfoundland"
- "Ballad of the Southern Cross"
- "Billy Peddle"
- "Doin' the Newfie Stomp"
- "Feller from Fortune"
- "Ferryland Sealer"
- "Fishin' in a Dory"
- "Good Ol' Newfie Music"
- "Granny's Drawehrs"
- "Harbour LeCou"
- "Heave Away"
- "Hip Rubber Gang"
- "I'm a Newfie by George"
- "I's The B'y"
- "Jack Hinks"
- "Jack Was Every Inch A Sailor"
- "Jolly Roving Tar"
- "Last Shanty"
- "Lukey's Boat"
- "Missing Home Today"
- "Mussels in the Corner"
- "Newfoundland Party"
- "The North Atlantic Squadron"
- "Now I'm 64"
- "Oh No, Not I"
- "Old Polina"
- "Piece of Baloney"
- "Rubber Boots Song"
- "Sally Brown"
- "She's Like the Swallow"
- "Star of Logy Bay"
- "Sweet Forget-Me-Not"
- "The Rattlin' Bog"
- "The Tiny Red Light"
- "Tishialuk Girls"
- "The Wedding in Renews"
- "Fishin' In a Dory"

== Songs with a known composer/lyricist ==
- "The Anti-Confederate Song (Come near at your peril, Canadian wolf)" - J. W. McGrath
- "Aunt Martha's Sheep" - Dick Nolan and Ellis Coles
- "The Badger Drive" - John V. Devine
- "The Banks of Newfoundland" - Francis Forbes
- "The Cliffs of Baccalieu" - Jack Withers
- "The CN Bus" - Tom Cahill
- "Cod Liver Oil" - Johnny Burke
- "Come Closer East Coaster" - Eddie Coffey
- "Concerning Charlie Horse" - Omar Blondahl
- "Daddy's Songs" - performed by Susan Lawrence/written by Gus Burton
- "Excursion Around The Bay" - Johnny Burke
- "The Government Game" - Al Pittman
- "Grey Foggy Day" - Eddie Coffey
- "Hard, Hard Times" - additional lyrics by William James Emberley
- "Heaven by Sea" - Simani
- "The Islander" - Bruce Moss
- "Kelligrews Soiree" - Johnny Burke
- "Let Me Fish Off Cape St. Mary's" (1947) – ballad by Otto P. Kelland
- "Lost Ties" - performed and written by Susan Lawrence
- "Merasheen Farewell" - Ernie Wilson
- "More Than St. John's" - Rusty Reid
- "Music and Friends" - Simani
- "Never Been There Before" - Johnny Burke
- "The Night Paddy Murphy Died" - Johnny Burke
- "No More Fish, No Fishermen" - Shelley Posen
- Ode to Newfoundland" - Words by Cavendish Boyle, music by Hubert Parry
- "Old Brown's Daughter" - Johnny Burke
- "Our Legend Harry Hibbs" Paul Hamilton
- "Out from St. Leonard's" - Gary O'Driscoll
- "Pat Murphy's Meadow" - John V. Devine
- "Petty Harbour Bait Skiff" - John Grace
- "The Liquor Continues to Flow" - performed by Susan Lawrence/written by Gus Burton
- "Recruiting Sergeant" - Great Big Sea
- "The Rocks of Merasheen" - Words by Al Pittman, music by Joe Byrne
- "The Ryans and The Pittmans (We'll Rant and We'll Roar)" - traditional, additional lyrics by W.H. LeMessurier
- "Saltwater Cowboys" - Simani
- "Saltwater Joys" - Wayne Chaulk performed by Buddy Wasisname and the Other Fellers
- "Song for Newfoundland" - Buddy Wasisname and the Other Fellers
- "Sonny's Dream" - Ron Hynes
- "Squid-Jiggin' Ground" - A. R. Scammell
- "Tickle Cove Pond" - Mark Walker
- "Towards the Sunset" - Pat and Joe Byrne
- "The Trinity Cake" - Johnny Burke
- "Up She Rises" - Bob Porter
- "West-Country Lady" - Dermot O'Reilly
- "Wave Over Wave" - Jim Payne and Fergus O'Byrne
- "The Northern Lights of Labrador" - Don Fulford (songwriter)
- "With me long rubbers on" - The Bay Boys
- "Mist" - Protest The Hero
- "In The Mornin'" - Hamilton Sound, composed by Linda Hickey
- "The Whistle Don't Blow " Hamilton Sound, composed by Linda Hickey
- "Vive la rose" - French traditional, recorded by Émile Benoît

== See also ==
- Music of Newfoundland and Labrador
- Music of Canada
