= Music of Newfoundland and Labrador =

Canadian culture article

Newfoundland and Labrador is an Atlantic Canadian province with a folk musical heritage based on the Irish, English and Cornish traditions.

Newfoundland music, while clearly Celtic and seafaring in its orientation, has an identifiable style of its own. Much of the region's music focuses on the strong seafaring tradition in the area, and includes sea shanties and other sailing songs. While drawing comparisons in its Celtic influence to music from neighboring Nova Scotia and Prince Edward Island, Newfoundland and Labrador music contains more distinct Irish, English, and Cornish influence. Modern traditional musicians include Great Big Sea, The Ennis Sisters and Ron Hynes.

== History ==
A bone flute found at L'Anse Amour in Labrador is not the first evidence of the presence of music in Newfoundland and Labrador. At the time, indigenous First Nations lived in the area. Little is known for certain of their musical heritage due to the lack of written records, but the Beothuk people are reputed to have sung and danced; few details are known by modern historians. Inuit music, including percussion and so-called mouth-music, is still performed, although with modern influences. The Innu also maintain some historical musical practices.

England, Ireland and Scotland sent many settlers to eastern Canada, and they brought with them instrumental tunes, ballads, and other musical traditions, which were passed down orally through the generations. During this time, traditional songs evolved, and some acquired new lyrics or melodies.

Marching and military bands were an important part of traditional Newfoundland and Labrador music. Youth groups like the Church Lads Brigade, fraternal organizations, and other groups supported these bands.

Newfoundland's anthem "The Ode to Newfoundland", was composed by Governor Cavendish Boyle.

Christian music from Newfoundland and Labrador includes hymns and other liturgical music. Missionaries such as those with the Moravian Church used music to reach out towards native peoples; a hymn book was published in the Inuit language in 1809.

During the 1800s, operas and musical theatre became popular. Charles Hutton (musician) was a well-known performer during the 1880s. Some of these musicians, including Georgina Stirling, became known in Europe. In the early 20th century, vaudeville took the place of opera in Newfoundland. Satirist John Burke was a noted vaudeville composer and performer of that era.

== Outside influences ==
Beginning in 1921, music from outside of the region became popular, especially after the advent of films with sound and the popularization of cowboy movies. Among the province's noted country musicians was Harry Martin.

During the 1920s and 1930s, jazz and country music arrived in Newfoundland and Labrador, both through local dance bands, radio broadcasts and phonograph records. These outside musical influences were followed in the 1950s and 1960s by R&B and rock and roll. Because of the presence of US military bases, including Pepperrell Air Force Base, locals were exposed to mainstream US radio artists which were not played on local radio. The American radio station VOUS (Voice of the United States) also broadcast out of St. John's, bringing American popular culture to both the soldiers and the Newfoundlanders.

== Modern era ==
In the modern era, many people worked to preserve the province's musical heritage. They focused on traditional songs, but also popularized modern tunes in a traditional style, for example Otto Kelland's 1947 composition "Let Me Fish Off Cape St. Mary's". The first hit from a native performer was 1943's "Squid-Jiggin' Ground" by Art Scammell. Radio programs such as Irene B. Mellon and The Big Six, the television shows All Around The Circle (1964) and Ryan's Fancy, collections such as Gerald S. Doyle's Old Time Songs and Poetry of Newfoundland, musicians including accordionists Ray Walsh, Wilf Doyle, Omar Blondahl, John White and the McNulty family (musicians), and scholars including Maud Karpeles also contributed to the preservation of Newfoundland and Labrador music.

Expatriates in Ontario, including Harry Hibbs and Dick Nolan also became well known. In the late 1970s and early 1980s, a roots revival led by the bands Ryan's Fancy, Figgy Duff and The Wonderful Grand Band achieved mainstream success in Newfoundland. Other traditional performers to rise to prominence in this period included Anita Best, Kelly Russell, Jim Payne, Émile Benoît, Rufus Guinchard, The Bay Boys and Minnie White.

In the 1980s and 1990s, the popularity of traditional Newfoundland music dwindled. However, rock, punk, heavy metal, blues and other styles developed their own scenes in the region. The province's first punk band Da Slyme formed in 1977. The Newfoundland Symphony Orchestra rose to prominence in this period, and jazz performers such as the Jeff Johnston Trio were also well known. In the early 1990s, Young Saints and Thomas Trio and the Red Albino became the first mainstream popular music bands from the province to attract attention outside the province.

The exception to this decline in traditional music's popularity was the Belloram-based group Simani, composed of Bud Davidge and Sim Savory. They recorded a total of 12 albums from 1977 to 1997 and enjoyed success throughout Newfoundland and Labrador.

The advent of the East Coast Music Awards helped stimulate the Atlantic Canadian music scene, and was accompanied by the rise of Ron Hynes, Buddy Wasisname, The Irish Descendants, and Thomas Trio and The Red Albino, while Great Big Sea, The Navigators, and The Punters have also become well known for their mixture of traditional and popular music. A resurgence of traditional Newfoundland music is evidenced by the creation of several popular compilation CDs such as The Christmas Wish: Newfoundland Yuletide Favourites, the Downhomer Presents... series, and the Homebrew series (which has sold over 50,000 copies).

In 2008, the Atlantis Music Prize was established by The Scope, and is to be awarded annually to the best new album from Newfoundland and Labrador. The first winning album was Another Month by Mercy, the Sexton. In the late 2000s, the local rap group Gazeebow Unit was noted for its use, whether parodic or metaparodic, of Newfoundland English in rap music.

Notable newcomers bringing national and international recognition to the province include Hey Rosetta!, Amelia Curran, The Mountains & the Trees, Sherman Downey, Adam Baxter, AE Bridger, Andrew James O'Brian, Don Brownrigg, Damhnait Doyle, Kat McLevey, The Novaks, and Soap Opera.

Since 2013, the musical Come From Away has been a major contributing factor in promoting the province and its people. While the score is mostly original music, the song "Heave Away" is prominently featured in one of the numbers.

== Radio play ==
Newfoundland music can be heard on CBC Radio One's local programming.

VOCM's Irish Newfoundland Show with Greg Smith Saturday mornings, Sunday mornings on CHOZ-FM's Jigs and Reels with Danielle Butt, or VOCM-FM's Homebrew with Sam Whiffen.

Memorial University's campus station, CHMR-FM Radio, has several shows dedicated entirely to Newfoundland and Labrador music, including Jiggs Dinner with Roland Skinner. Other stations playing local music are Southern Shore Sounds (Ferryland); Voice of Bonne Bay (VOBB); MUN Radio, CHMR-FM 93.5 FM (Aliant 787 and Rogers 942); CKWR-FM 98.5 FM; CJBI-FM; and BayFM 100.1 CKVB-FM (Corner Brook; formerly Bay of Islands Radio, and abbreviated BOIR).

More Celtic and local music can be heard on Celtic Wake Up hosted by Zach Snow and The NewFound Records Radio Hour hosted by Wayne Tucker; both programs air on CHMR.

A weekly live-to-air radio show called Jigs & Reels Radio KW airs on CKWR-FM; the station broadcasts from Kitchener-Waterloo, Ontario, while the Jigs & Reels Reels program is hosted Dean Clarke.

== Noted artists ==
Modern Newfoundland & Labrador musicians include Hey Rosetta!, folk group The Flummies, rock musician David Penashue of Tipatchimun (who sings Innu language rock), Canadian folk-rock band Great Big Sea, and Canadian folk trio The Once.

- Duane Andrews
- Tim Baker
- Anita Best
- D'Arcy Broderick
- Buddy Wasisname and the Other Fellers
- Matthew Byrne
- Amelia Curran
- The Dardanelles
- Alan Doyle
- Dahmnait Doyle
- Ennis Sisters
- The Fables
- Jim Fidler
- Figgy Duff
- The Flummies
- Fortunate Ones
- Bob Hallet
- Hey Rosetta!
- Harry Hibbs
- Ron Hynes
- Séan McCann
- Alan Mills
- Patrick Moran
- Joan Morrissey
- Dick Nolan
- Fergus O'Byrne
- The Once
- Jim Payne
- Darrell Power
- Tom Power
- Rum Ragged
- Kelly Russell
- Ryan's Fancy
- Art Scammel
- Simani
- Kim Stockwood
- Ken Tizzard
- Wonderful Grand Band

== See also ==
- List of Newfoundland songs
- Corey and Trina
- Tri Martolod
