= I's the B'y =

Traditional Newfoundland folk song

"I'se the B'y" (Roud 4432, also I's the Bye or Liverpool Handy) is a traditional Newfoundland folk song/ballad. "I's the B'y" is in the Newfoundland English dialect, and translates to standard English as "I'm the Boy" or "I'm the Guy" (The title is a contraction of 'I is the boy,' reflecting a construction found elsewhere in Newfoundland English). The Canadian Songwriters Hall of Fame decided to honour the song in 2005, officially accepting it as part of the Canadian Song Hall of Fame.

Native Newfoundland folk songs have fared well in terms of continued popularity, due in part to their appearance in widely circulated publications such as Gerald S. Doyle's songsters. Doyle's company published five free and popular collections of Newfoundland songs, the first in 1927, as a means of promoting his patent medicine business. These songs included "I'se the B'y", "Tickle Cove Pond", "Jack Was Every Inch a Sailor", "Old Polina", "The Ryans and the Pittmans", and "Lukey's Boat".

Professional musicians including Clint Curtiss, Dick Nolan, Great Big Sea and Gordon Bok have recorded the song (the latter under both its original name and the title "Liverpool Handy"). Toronto-based Ubiquitous Synergy Seeker sampled the lyrics in their first single, "Hollowpoint Sniper Hyperbole". An instrumental version of the song was also played in episode two of the HBO series The Neistat Brothers.

A Strathspey for pan flutes was composed in honour of "I's the B'y".

== Lyrics ==
I's the b'y that builds the boat
And I's the b'y that sails her
I's the b'y that catches the fish
And brings them home to Liza. (or Lizer)

Chorus: Hip yer partner, Sally Tibbo
Hip yer partner, Sally Brown
Fogo, Twillingate, Moreton's Harbour
All around the circle!

Sods and rinds to cover your flake
Cake and tea for supper
Codfish caught in the spring of the year
Fried in maggoty butter.

Chorus

I don't want your maggoty fish
They're no good for winter
I could buy as good as that
Down in Bonavista.

Chorus

I took Liza to a dance
As fast as she could travel
And every step that she did take
Was up to her knees in gravel.

Chorus

Susan White, she's out of sight
Her petticoat wants a border
Old Sam Oliver in the dark
He kissed her in the corner.

== See also ==
- List of Newfoundland songs

== Notes ==
1. fish: Unless otherwise specified, "fish" in Newfoundland English almost always refers to codfish, fish entry at the Dictionary of Newfoundland English
2. rind: A long strip of bark, normally from a standing spruce or fir, and used for various fisheries and building purposes, rind entry at the Dictionary of Newfoundland English
3. flake: A platform built on poles and spread with boughs for drying codfish on land, flake entry at the Dictionary of Newfoundland English
4. cake: Ship's biscuit or hardtack, cake entry at the Dictionary of Newfoundland English
5. maggoty fish: Fish when not cured correctly would become infested with Blow-fly larva, maggoty entry at the Dictionary of Newfoundland English
