= Squid-Jiggin' Ground =

Newfoundland folk song

"Squid Jiggin' Ground" (1928) is a song written by Arthur Scammell that describes a traditional way of life of local Newfoundland fishermen. The song is unique in that it describes the method of "jigging" for squid, and the type of equipment and circumstance that revolve around the activity.

The song is sung to the traditional Irish jig "Larry O'Gaff".

On 1 April 1949, in ceremonies marking Newfoundland's confederation with Canada, the tune was played as the representative song for Newfoundland on the carillon of the Peace Tower in Ottawa. Arthur Scammell was actually in Ottawa on the day and was surprised to hear 'his' tune being played.

== Recordings ==
The song was recorded by Hank Snow on a single for the Canadian market. Stompin' Tom Connors sang the song in 1973 at the Horseshoe Tavern in Toronto Canada, a performance available on his live DVD Across This Land With Stompin Tom Connors.

- Harry Hibbs: Harry Hibbs At The Caribou Club (Instrumental), 1968/Somewhere At Sea (Vocal), 1971
- Finest Kind: Heart's Delight, 1999
- The Wiggles and Tom McGlynn: Let's Eat!, 2010
- The Wiggles and Tim Chaisson: Duets, 2017
- Ryan's Fancy
- Mark Alan Lovewell: Sea Songs of Martha’s Vineyard, 2002, remastered 2004

== See also ==
- List of Newfoundland songs
