= Aunt Martha =

Aunt Martha may refer to:

- Aunt Martha (television character), a fictional recurring character in the American television sitcom Leave It to Beaver
- Aunt Martha (TV series), a Russian TV series

== See also ==
- Aunt Martha's Sheep, a Canadian song by Terrence White and Arthur Butt
