= Feller from Fortune =

Newfoundland folk song

Feller from Fortune (Roud 4427, also called "Lots of Fish in Bonavist' Harbour") is a Newfoundland folk song. Fortune is a town in Newfoundland. It was collected by Margaret Sargant and Kenneth Peacock in Newfoundland in 1950/1, and first appeared in print in the mid-1950s. The earliest well-known recording is from 1961 by Alan Mills & Jean Carignan (from their album Songs, Fiddle Tunes and a Folk-Tale from Canada). More recently, it has been recorded by the Blackthorn Ceilidh Band, Dick Nolan and Great Big Sea.

== Lyrics ==
These are one set of lyrics as found in most folk music anthologies and as sung by Alan Mills.

More recent performances tend to leave out one or more verses and focus more on instrumentals. In particular, the verse which speaks of "Drinkin' rum and wine and cassis" is usually omitted - this may be related to the song's frequent inclusion in albums for children.

Oh, there's lots of fish in Bonavist' Harbour,
Lots of fish right in around here'
Boys and girls are fishin' together'
Forty-five from Carbonear.

Chorus:
Oh, catch-a-hold this one, catch-a-hold that one
Swing around this one, swing around she;
Dance around this one, dance around that one
Diddle-dum this one, diddle-dum dee.

Oh, Sally is the pride of Cat Harbour,
Ain't been swung since last year,
Drinkin' rum and wine and cassis
What the boys brought home from St Pierre.

Oh, Sally goes to church every Sunday
Not for to sing nor for to hear,
But to see the feller from Fortune
What was down here fishin' the year .

Oh, Sally's got a bouncin' new baby,
Father said that he didn't care,
'Cause she got that from the feller from Fortune
What was down here fishin' the year.

Oh, Uncle George got up in the mornin',
He got up in an 'ell of a tear
And he ripped the arse right out of his britches
Now he's got ne'er pair to wear.

Oh, there's lots of fish in Bonavist' Harbour,
Lots of fishermen in around here;
Swing your partner, Jimmy Joe Jacobs,
I'II be home in the spring of the year.

== Meaning ==
Most would agree that the lines about fish and fishing are metaphors for the dating scene (in a Newfoundland fishing village). The rest of the lyrics back this up, describing drinking (of liquor smuggled in from St Pierre), dancing, and unintentional pregnancy.

== See also ==
- List of Newfoundland songs
