= Mussels in the Corner =

Newfoundland folk song

Mussels in the Corner is a Newfoundland folk song.

In 2005, nine hundred and eighty-nine musicians gathered in St. John's at the Newfoundland and Labrador Folk Festival to play "Mussels in the Corner" on accordions to set a world record for simultaneous accordion playing.

== Lyrics ==
Mussels in the Corner

Chorus:

'Deed I is in love with you
Up all night in the foggy dew
'Deed I is in love with you
Mussels in the corner

Ask a townie for a smoke
He will say his pipe is broke
Ask a bayman for a chew
He will bite it off for you

(chorus)

Dirty shirts and dirty ties
Dirty rings around their eyes
Can't get up the morning b'ys
Dirty auld Torbaymen

(chorus)

Here they are as white as ghosts
Baymen in their little boats
Women in their petticoats
Down in Petty Harbour

(chorus)

I took Liza to the ball
Liza couldn't dance at all
nailed her up against the wall
left her there till sunday

(chorus)

All the people in Belle Isle
Don't get up till half past nine
Wash their face in kerosene oil
Polly, you're a corker!

(chorus)

Elsie Murray, she's so fine,
Don't get up til half past nine
Won't get up to feed the swine
Dirty Elsie Murray.

'Deed I is in love with you
Up all night in the foggy dew
'Deed I is in love with you
Mussels in the corner

== See also ==
- List of Newfoundland songs
