= The Flemings of Torbay =

The Flemings Of Torbay is a popular Newfoundland folk song about two young men from Torbay. It was written by Johnny Burke, a popular St. John's balladeer.

== Lyrics ==
The thrilling news we heard last week
is in our memories yet,
Two fishermen from Newfoundland
saved from the jaws of death;
Two fine young men born in Torbay
who went adrift at sea,
On the eighteenth day of April
from the schooner Jubilee.

They left to prosecute their voyage
near the Grand Banks' stormy shore,
Where many's the hardy fisherman
was never heard of more;
For six long days in storms at sea
those hardy fellows stood,
Fatigued, footsore, and hungry,
no water or no food.

Tossed on the seas ail those long days
while bitter was each night,
No friend to speak a kindly word,
no sail to heave in sight;
At last a vessel hove in sight
and saw the floating speck,
The Jessie Maurice was her name,
coal laden from Quebec.

Our wheelsman well-trained he espied
clear through the misty haze,
Those poor exhausted fishermen
adrift so many days;
Our captain, a kindhearted man,
had just come on the deck,
Then orders gave to hard aport
and shaped her for the wreck.

Two hours or more while the winds did roar
the Jessie sailed around,
To see if any tidings of
the dory could be found;
The crew was stationed on the bow
all anxious her to hail,
When the captain spied her in
the fog just aft the water rail.

Our brave commander right away
the order gave to launch,
The jolly boats that hung astern
of good old oak so staunch;
Two brave old seamen manned the oars
and at the word to go,
The captain standing in the bow
to take the boat in tow.

The captain gripped the painter for
to bring her to the barque,
While those on board were still as death,
their features cold and dark;
A sling was then made fast below
in which those men to place,
While tender-hearted mariners
they worked with noble faith.

No sign of life was in those men
as they were placed in bed,
But still our captain held out hope
the vital spark not fled;
He watched for days and sleepless nights
to bring those men around,
And on the second day discerned
but just a feeble sound.

The first to speak was Peter,
the eldest of the two,
He told the captain who they were,
a part of the Jubilee's crew;
And how in April on the Banks
they chanced to drift astray,
And lay exposed in an open boat
for six long stormy days.

Our captain then our stuns'l set
and shaped her for Quebec,
He took on board the dory
and all left of the wreck;
He watched those men with a mother's care
while in their berth they lay,
And saved the lives of two poor boys
once more to see Torbay.

God bless the Jessie's gallant crew,
likewise their captain bold,
Their names should be recorded
into letters of bright gold;
And send them peace and happiness
in every port they lay,
The plucky boys that saved the life
of the Flemings of Torbay.

== See also ==
- List of Newfoundland songs
