= Jolly Roving Tar =

Newfoundland folk song

Jolly Roving Tar is a traditional Newfoundland folk song. In its 19th-century version, the song relates the story of Susan, lamenting the wanderings of her beloved "tar", or sailor, William, who is at sea, and deciding to follow him in her father's boat. The title is also applied to the folk song* "Get up, Jack! John, sit down!", a reel of unknown provenance in which some, but not all, versions includes the line, "Come along, come along, my jolly brave tars, there's lots of grog in the jars."

- There is a song called "Get-Up Jack, John Sit-Down" with words by Edward Harrigan (1844 - 1911) and music by Dave Braham (1838 - 1905). It is from their music hall show "Old Lavender," produced in circa 1885. A digital image of the score is available on the Library of Congress Website.

== Lyrics ==
Lyrics as transcribed in 1888 by John Ashton in Modern Street Ballads.

It was in the town of Liverpool, all in the month of May,
I overheard a damsel, alone as she did stray,
She did appear like Venus or some sweet, lovely star,
As she walked toward the beach, lamenting for her jolly, roving Tar.

"Oh, William, gallant William, how can you sail away?
I have arrived at twenty-one, and I'm a lady gay,
I will man one of my father's ships and face the horrid war,
And cross the briny ocean for my jolly, roving Tar.

Young William looked so manly, drest all in his sailor's clothes,
His cheeks they were like roses, his eyes as black as sloes,
His hair hung down in ringlets, but he is gone afar,
And my heart lies in the bosom of my jolly, roving Tar.

Come all you jolly sailors, and push the boat ashore,
That I may see my father's ships and see they are secure,
Provisions we have plenty, and lots of grog in store,
So drink good health you sailors, to my jolly, roving Tar."

She quickly jumped into the boat and merrily left the land,
And as the sailors rowed away, she wav'd her lily hand,
"Farewell, ye girls of Liverpool, I fear no wound nor scar."
And away went pretty Susan to her jolly, roving Tar.

== See also ==
- List of Newfoundland songs
