= Let's Eat (album) =

2010 studio album/video by The Wiggles

Studio album by the Wiggles
- Released: 1 July 2010
- Recorded: 2008–2010
- Genre: Children's music
- Label: ABC
- Producer: Anthony Field

The Wiggles chronology
Hot Potatoes: The Best of the Wiggles (2009)	Let's Eat (2010)	Ukulele Baby! (2011)

Let's Eat is the 32nd the Wiggles album released in 2010 by ABC Music distributed by Universal Music Australia. Featuring guest vocalists Keith Urban, Mic Conway, Tom McGlynn, Paul Field and the band Mental As Anything. It was released on 1 July 2010 & won the 2010 ARIA for Best Children's album. The album cover imitates that of The Beatles' album Sgt. Pepper's Lonely Hearts Club Band.

== Track listing ==
All tracks are written by Murray Cook, Jeff Fatt, Anthony Field, Sam Moran and John Field, except listed below.

No.	Title	Writer(s)	Length
1.	"Let's Cook"	Martin Murphy
2.	"Clap Your Hands With Dorothy"	Cook, Fatt, Field, Moran
3.	"Monday Is Muffin Day!"
4.	"England Swings"	Roger Miller
5.	"Alabama Jubilee"	George L Cobb/Jack Yellen
6.	"I Love Waffles in the Morning"	Cook, Fatt, Field, John Field
7.	"Tuesday Is Taco Day!"
8.	"Have A Laugh! (Funny Face)"	Cook, Fatt, Field, Moran
9.	"Go Far, Big Red Car"	Mic Conway
10.	"On Aunt Nellie's Farm"	Mic Conway, John Field
11.	"Cook, Captain, Cook!"	Cook, Fatt, Field, Moran, Simon Pryce
12.	"Wednesday Is Watermelon Day!"
13.	"Dreidel, Dreidel, Dreidel"	Trad. Arr. Cook, Fatt, Field, Moran
14.	"Tom Love-Eatin'"	Paul Paddick
15.	"Clean Your Teeth"	Cook, Fatt, Field, Moran, Paul Field
16.	"Yellow Bird"	Norman Luboff, Alan Bergman*, Marilyn Bergman*
17.	"Thursday Is Bratwurst Day!"
18.	"That's What You Call Digestion"	Mic Conway, John Field
19.	"Sound Your Funky Horn"	Harry Casey, Clarence Reid
20.	"Rag Mop"	Deacon Anderson, Johnnie Wills
21.	"Dorothy, Pick Roses with Me"	Cook, Fatt, Field, Moran
22.	"Friday Is Fish Fry Day!"
23.	"Squid-Jiggin' Ground"	Arthur Scammell
24.	"Sleep Safe, My Baby"	Paul Field
25.	"Wonderful Wags"	Cook, Fatt, Field, Moran, Mic Conway, John Field
26.	"Saturday Is a Sultana Day!"
27.	"Wash Your Hands"	Cook, Fatt, Field, Moran
28.	"Sunday Is Sandwich Day!"

== Video ==
Let's Eat
- Directed by: Paul Field
- Produced by: Paul Field
- Starring: Sam Moran; Anthony Field; Murray Cook; Jeff Fatt; Paul Field; Mic Conway; Mental As Anything; Tom McGlynn
- Distributed by: Roadshow/ABC DVD
- Release date: 2 September 2010
- Running time: 75 minutes
- Country: Australia

Let's Eat was released on ABC DVD in 2010.

=== Song list ===
1. Let's Cook
2. Clap Your Hands With Dorothy
3. Monday Is Muffin Day!
4. England Swings
5. Alabama Jubilee
6. Have a Laugh! (Funny Face)
7. I Love Waffles in the Morning
8. Tuesday Is Taco Day!
9. Go Far, Big Red Car
10. On Aunt Nellie's Farm
11. Cook, Captain, Cook!
12. Have a Laugh! (Handstand)
13. Wednesday Is Watermelon Day!
14. Dreidel, Dreidel, Dreidel
15. Tom Love-Eatin'
16. Clean Your Teeth
17. Yellow Bird
18. Thursday Is Bratwurst Day!
19. Have a Laugh! (Wacky Dance)
20. That's What You Call Digestion
21. Sound Your Funky Horn
22. Rag Mop
23. Dorothy, Pick Roses with Me
24. Friday Is Fish Fry Day!
25. Have a Laugh! (Wobbly Walk)
26. Squid Jiggin' Ground
27. Sleep Safe, My Baby
28. Wonderful Wags
29. Saturday Is a Sultana Day!
30. Wash Your Hands
31. Sunday Is Sandwich Day!
