= Tickle Cove =

- Settlement
- Location of Tickle Cove in Newfoundland
- Coordinates: 48°34′57″N 53°28′53″W
- Country: Canada
- Province: Newfoundland and Labrador
- Time zone: UTC-3:30 (Newfoundland Time)
  - Summer (DST): UTC-2:30 (Newfoundland Daylight)
- Area code: 709

Tickle Cove is a settlement in Newfoundland and Labrador, located north west of Catalina, in Bonavista Bay. The first postmaster was John Maloney. The 2013 comedy The Grand Seduction was filmed in Tickle Cove, and its setting of Tickle Head is based on the settlement.

Tickle Cove is the subject of the folk song "Tickle Cove Pond" by Mark Walker, who was born in Tickle Cove in 1846.

The Tickle Cove Sea Arch is a Discovery UNESCO Global Geopark.

== See also ==
- List of communities in Newfoundland and Labrador
- Tickle Cove Pond
