= Hard, Hard Times =

"Hard, Hard Times" (Roud 876) is a traditional Newfoundland folk song/ballad, adapted from an earlier English song, "Rigs of the Times" by William James Emberley. The song has been sung and recorded by a number of Newfoundland musicians.

== History ==
William James Emberley (June 26, 1876 – June 10, 1937) was a Newfoundland and Labrador fisherman who grew up in Bay de Verde, Newfoundland Canada, the son of Joseph and Jane (Russell).

During the Great Depression of the 1930s, because of the collapse of the international economy, fishermen, including Emberley, were unable to sell their fish; many were reduced to living on the government dole, which was six cents a day. In 1936, Emberly adapted the English song, "Rigs of the Times", to reflect the fishermen's plight. He called it "Hard, Hard Times".

Emberley's verses reflect a style commonly found in the 18th-century English broadside which made fun of various occupations and made light of difficult circumstances. The song soon became part of the Newfoundland historical tradition. The Emberley version was recorded by Dick Nolan, and was published in Edith Fowke's The Penguin Book of Canadian Folk Songs (Harmondsworth, England, 1973).

As "Hard, Hard Times" or "Rigs of the Times", the song has also been recorded by Shirley Collins, Martin Carthy, Maddy Prior and others. Steeleye Span recorded a related song from England after the Napoleonic Wars: "Hard Times of Old England".

== Lyrics ==
Come all you good people I'll sing you a song,
About the poor people, how they get along;
They'll start in the Spring, finish up in the Fall,
And when it's all over they got nothin' at all.
And it's hard hard times.

Go out in the mornin', go on if it's still,
It's over the side you'll hear the line knell;
For out goes the jigger and freezes the cold,
And as for the startings all gone in the hole.
And it's hard hard times.

The fine side of fishing we'll have by and by,
The fine side of fishing we'll have a good buy;
Seven dollars for large and six-fifty for small,
Take out your West Indie, you've nothing at all.
And it's hard hard times.

When you got some spearin' they're hung out to dry,
It'll take all your time to brush off the flies;
To keep off the flies it is more than you'll do,
Then out comes the sun and she all splits in two.
And it's hard hard times.

Then next comes the carpenter to build you a house,
He'll build her so snug you'll scarce find a mouse;
With holes in the roof and the rain it will pour,
The chimney will smoke and it's open the door.
And it's hard hard times.

Then next comes the doctor the worst one of all,
Saying what is the matter with you all this Fall;
Says he will cure you of all your disease,
When the money he's got you can die if you please.
And it's hard hard times.

The best thing to do is to work with a will,
For when it's all finished you're hauled on the hill;
You're hauled on the hill and put down in the cold,
And when it's all finished you're still in the hole.
And it's hard hard times.

== See also ==
- List of Newfoundland songs
