= Dermot O'Reilly =

Dermot Anthony O'Reilly

Background information
- Born: 1942; Dublin, Ireland
- Died: 17 February 2007 (aged 64–65) St. John's
- Genres: Irish, Folk
- Occupations: Singer, Songwriter, Musician, Record producer, Television producer
- Instruments: Guitar, Mandolin

Dermot Anthony O'Reilly (1942 – 17 February 2007) was an Irish-born Canadian musician, producer and songwriter.

== Life ==
He was born in Dublin, Ireland, and educated at Inchicore in the city.

In March 1968, O'Reilly emigrated to Toronto where he met future bandmates Fergus O'Byrne and Denis Ryan. He was one of the founding members of The Sons of Erin and helped form the band Sullivan's Gypsies in 1970.

In 1971, O'Reilly, O'Byrne and Ryan moved to St. John's and began performing as Ryan's Fancy. Ryan's Fancy became a popular Irish group that released 12 albums and hosted a successful television program for several seasons. O'Reilly wrote and produced many Irish songs as a member of Ryan's Fancy, as a solo artist and later as a member of the group Brishney. O'Reilly performed regularly with Fergus O'Byrne.

In 2004, Ryan's Fancy was honored with a Lifetime Achievement Award by the East Coast Music Association. After Ryan's Fancy disbanded, O'Reilly founded Piperstock Productions, a video production and marketing company based in Torbay, Newfoundland and Labrador.

O'Reilly died of a heart attack, aged 64, in St. John's and is survived by his wife, Ann, and their three daughters.

== Works ==
Some of Piperstock's video productions are:

- The Last Run
- Rigs, Jigs and Songs from the Heart
- Cain's Legacy

== See also ==
- Music of Newfoundland and Labrador
- List of Newfoundland songs
