= The Night Paddy Murphy Died =

Newfoundland folk song

"The Night Paddy Murphy Died" is a popular Newfoundland folk song regarding the death of a man and the antics of his friends as they engage in a traditional Irish wake. It is often attributed to Johnny Burke (1851–1930), a popular St. John's balladeer. One of the earliest known recordings of the song is by Irish-American immigrants, the Flanagan Brothers, on October 25, 1926 in New York City for the Victor label.

The song has been recorded by numerous artists, including Ryan's Fancy on their 1973 album Newfoundland Drinking Songs, The Irish Brigade on their 1991 album Are You Ready For This?, Darby O'Gill on their 2002 album Waitin' for a Ride, Drunk & Disorderly on their album Home By Way of the Gutter, Great Big Sea on their 1997 and 2000 albums Play and Road Rage, Fiddler's Green on their 2007 album Drive Me Mad!, by the Washington Square Harp and Shamrock Orchestra on their 2011 album Since Maggie Dooley Learned the Hooley Hooley and by Paddy Murphy on the 2012 album Dog's Dinner, recently in 2026 Deiedra Rebel Folk from Basque Lands play song in basque lenguage (euskara).

The song was also covered by The Mudmen on their 2012 album Donegal Danny.

Russell Crowe sang along to the song in the 2009 film State of Play.

== See also ==
- List of Newfoundland songs
