= Old Brown's Daughter =

English song

Song
- Published: 1878
- Genre: Music hall
- Songwriter: G. W. Hunt

Old Brown's Daughter (Roud 1426) was an English music hall song, sung by Alfred Vance, and became a Newfoundland folk song. It was written by G. W. Hunt (c.1837–1904), circa 1878, although it is often wrongly credited to Johnny Burke (1851–1930). It was in the repertoire of English folk singer Walter Pardon on his 1975 album, A Proper Sort. Peter Bellamy also sang a version of Old Brown's Daughter on his 1975 self-titled album. In 1991, Damien Barber recorded the song for Fellside Records and it was released on the compilation Voices in 1992. The melody was rewritten by Newfoundland singer/songwriter Ron Hynes and Hynes' version was covered by Great Big Sea on their 1999 album, Turn.

== Lyrics ==
There is an ancient party at the other end of town,
He keeps a little grocery store and the ancient's name is Brown;
He has a lovely daughter, such a treat I never saw,
Oh, I only hope someday to be the old man's son-in-law.

Old Brown sells from off the shelf most anything you please,
He's got Jew's harps for the little boys, lollipops, and cheese;
His daughter minds the store, and it's a treat to see her serve,
I'd like to run away with her, but I don't have the nerve.

And it's Old Brown's daughter is a proper sort of girl,
Old Brown's daughter is as fair as any pearl;
I wish I was a Lord Mayor, Marquis, or an Earl,
And blow me if I wouldn't marry Old Brown's girl.

Well Poor Old Brown now has trouble with the gout,
He grumbles in his little parlour when he can't get out;
And when I make a purchase and she hands me the change,
That girl she makes me pulverised, I feel so very strange.

And it's Old Brown's daughter is a proper sort of girl,
Old Brown's daughter is as fair as any pearl;
I wish I was a Lord Mayor, Marquis, or an Earl,
And blow me if I wouldn't marry Old Brown's girl.

Miss Brown she smiles so sweetly when I say a tender word,
But Old Brown says that she must wed a Marquis or a Lord;
Well, I don't suppose it's ever one of those things I will be,
But, by jingo, next election I will run for Trinity.

And it's Old Brown's daughter is a proper sort of girl,
Old Brown's daughter is as fair as any pearl;
I wish I was a Lord Mayor, Marquis or an Earl,
And blow me if I wouldn't marry Old Brown's girl.

Blow me if I wouldn't marry Old Brown's girl.

== Early Publication ==
The Roud Folk Song Index records that this song was issued as a broadside by a number of publishers. A copy published by Pearson of Manchester is in the Bodleian Ballad Collection.

== Notable adaptations ==
Being a well-documented song publicised by English Folk Dance and Song Society, and Mainly Norfolk, the song was recorded by Jon Boden and Oli Steadman for inclusion in their respective lists of daily folk songs "A Folk Song a Day" and "365 Days Of Folk".

== See also ==
- List of Newfoundland songs
