= Flanagan Brothers =

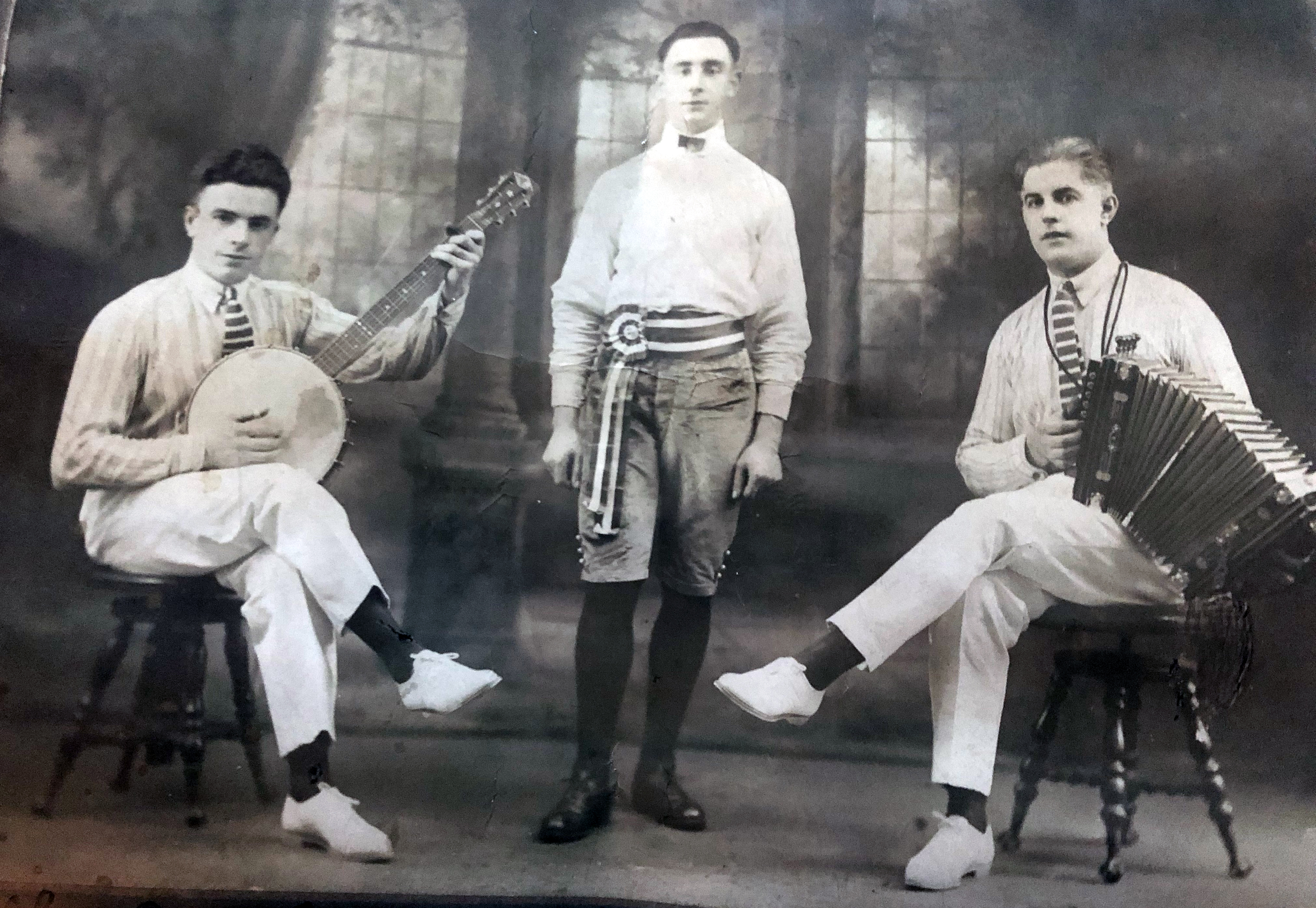
Mike (Left) and Joe (Right) Flanagan, joined by dancer Johnny Grant (Center). Date unknown.

The Flanagan Brothers were an Irish American band formed in the 1920s which consisted of brothers Michael, Joseph, and Louis Flanagan. Their choice of instruments and related skill gave them a unique sound, which led them to become one of the leading attractions in New York City's Irish dancehalls during the 1920s and 1930s. Subsequently, their phonograph records extended their popularity and fame to Ireland and into the homes of Irish emigrants throughout the world.

== Early history ==
The Flanagan brothers—Joe, Louis, and Mike—were born at the end of the nineteenth century and raised in the city of Waterford, on the south coast of Ireland. Their father, Arthur Flanagan, was a coachman and quay laborer in Waterford, where he met and, in 1890, married Ellen Keane. Working on the quays, Arthur was familiar with the ships that plied the trade to the United States, and as a young man he had made several working trips there. Ellen and Arthur began their married life in Philadelphia, Pennsylvania where their eldest daughter was born, followed by a son in 1894, Arthur Joseph, "Joe." The family subsequently returned to Waterford and settled in a three-room house on Summerhill Terrace where five more children were born – two girls and three boys. Louis, named after his maternal grandfather, arrived in October 1896; and Michael was born in November 1897. Thomas, the family's last child, arrive three years later but was frail from birth and his absence from official records suggest that he died in infancy. The children were educated at the local school – conducted by religious order, the De La Salle Brothers – not far from the family home near Waterford's city center.

Arthur and Ellen, along with all of their children, returned to America in 1911, this time settling in Albany, New York, where Arthur's uncle, Ed Lynch, lived. The family's passage was paid by Ed, and it was in his home on Morton Avenue in Albany that the Flanagans settled initially and begin a new life. Louis and Mike completed their education at St. Anne's School in Albany.

Music was an every day part of life in the Flanagan household. Father Arthur played the single row accordion or melodeon, while mother Ellen was a singer with a large repertoire of Irish songs, which she taught to her children. Mike recalled that his first introduction to playing music was in Waterford when, at the age of ten, he plucked out a tune on a charred mandolin he had recovered from a fire. Later, in Albany, he joined family music sessions with his father and brother Joe, who was learning to play the accordion.

When school days ended, the brothers were attracted to the bright lights of New York City. Joseph found a job as a clerk in Manhattan in 1918. Mike joined him there and found work shoeing horses for a blacksmith and working as a furrier in the colorful midtown Irish neighborhood known as Hell's Kitchen. Louis, along with sisters Mary and Margaret followed and, along with their father, Arthur, set up house on E. 88th St.

== Initial success ==
In their free time, the brothers teamed up to play music for their own entertainment, and the Flanagan sound gradually evolved. Joe was becoming a fine accordion player while Lou added banjo accompaniment and later introduce the guitar – an instrument then new to accompanying Irish music. Mike switched from mandolin to banjo. He remembered buying his first tenor banjo from Eddie Peabody‘s music store on 34th St. The banjo was then uncharted territory in Irish music and Mike and Lou developed their own method of playing – Mike picking out tunes in unison with Joe’s accordion while Lou provided a chordal accompaniment with driving rhythm on his banjo or guitar. Between tunes, Joe lilted and sang all kinds of Irish and popular songs, with Mike providing harmony and choruses. Mike also learned to play the Jew's harp.

The continuous flow of immigrants into New York City had established the Irish as the city’s dominant ethnic group by the opening decades of the 20th century, with over half a million citizens having Irish connections. Countless bars, dancehalls, and social clubs prospered in Irish neighborhoods. These venues provided music, especially for dancing – a popular form of entertainment among exiles. The Flanagan Brothers began playing these venues and it did not take long for them to make an impression. The trio’s punchy, rhythmic brand of toe-tapping music was perfectly suited to noisy ball rooms. Their sound appealed to listeners and guaranteed a floor full of dancers. The brothers prospered, holding down day jobs and performing on weeknights and on weekends. During an interview, Mike recalled: “We’d play till two or three in the morning, come home, change our clothes, and go to work. That’s what I did many’s the night.“

== Recording career ==
The Flanagan Brothers were part of the large community of immigrant Irish musicians playing in New York City at that time. Inevitably, entrepreneurs recognized the potential market for this music as recording material for the increasingly popular 78 RPM discs. The major record companies were at first unconvinced and it fell to small, independent labels to prove the market existed. The Flanagans’ first disc, An Carrowath – featuring the horn pipe – was released by the M&C New Republic Irish Record Company in December, 1921. An Carrowath was later recorded as a song, The Little Beggarman, and was also the name given to the group's recording of The Stack of Wheat. Thus begun a highly successful recording career which produced 168 records for numerous labels over the following decade.

New York buzzed with music sessions in bars, on radio, and in private homes. Mike recalled playing alongside fiddlers Michael Coleman, James Morrison, and other musicians whose fame would be established during this era.

For special occasions in the Irish calendar, the Flanagans joined forces with piper Tom Ennis to play as a quartet. Sadly, no recording of this combination is known to survive. Ennis was the owner of a music shop near Columbus Circle and Mike worked there at one time as a record salesman.

Following the release of their first disc, the brothers’ career continued to progress as they recorded for labels like Emerald, Gennett, and Vocalion, but they moved into the big league when they joined Columbia in 1923. Columbia's partnership with EMI in England meant that the Flanagans’ records could also be manufactured under license in England, and their discs were soon sold throughout Ireland.

The final elements in the commercial success of the Flanagans’ records were added in 1926 when they recorded Fun at Hogan’s, the first of many comics sketches adapted from standard Vaudevillian gags of the day. That same year their first song was recorded and Victor (later RCA Victor), Columbia's great rival, also recorded the group. Recurring ill health made Lou's role in the trio uncertain from this time, but Joe and Mike continued their act as a duo and added musicians for dancehall and studio work, as required.

The Flanagan's music was diverse and they recorded a wide variety of material. Their instrumental sound was unmistakable, even when they recorded under pseudonyms like The Irish Big Four, The Donovan Trio, or The County Cork Trio.

The brothers epitomised the immigration of Irish musicians, typified in the emergence of the recording and entertainment industries, dance halls and radio broadcasting.

== Later years ==
After their recording career peaked and the popularity of the dancehalls in New York City began to wane, the brothers became focused on their respective families and moved on from playing together.

Joe, who had married in 1923, remained in Queens and signed on as a regular player with an orchestra. Joe died in 1940.

Lou, who had continued to suffer from ill health, died at an early age in the mid 1930s.

Mike, who married his first wife in 1924, had moved back to Albany, New York by 1941 with his family. Mike began working for his brother-in-law, who had a successful wholesale produce business, but also remained an active musician. He would regularly play at the popular resorts and clubs in the “Irish Alps” – the area in and around the town of East Durham in New York's Catskill Mountains, where the center of Irish culture in the northeast had shifted. Mike had been joined by a new accordion player, Noel Rosenthal, and the duo, known as Mike & Ike, played the Catskill resorts and the local Albany scene well into the 1980s. Mike died in 1990.

== Legacy ==
In 1981, Celtic group De Dannan recorded a cover of "My Irish Molly-O", a tune which the Flanagan Brothers popularized and first recorded in 1928. The De Dannan version of the song became a top-ten hit for the group, which led to a resurgence of interest in the Flanagan Brothers contributions.

Along with seven of his children, their respective spouses, and two of his grandchildren, Mike Flanagan returned to Ireland in 1983 for the last time. The renewed interest in his and his brothers’ music accorded Mike an interview on national television and an official civic reception in his hometown of Waterford during the visit. Perhaps a more important milestone during this trip, however, was the parting gift Mike was able to give on what he knew would be his last visit to Ireland. Accompanied by De Dannan founding member Frankie Gavin and noted accordionist Paul Brock, Mike gave an impromptu performance at Shannon International Airport while waiting for his plane back to New York.

In 2016, the Comhaltas Ceoltóirí Éireann (CCÉ), the primary Irish organization dedicated to the promotion of the music, song, dance and the language of Ireland, created The Mike Flanagan Award for Outstanding Achievement in Banjo due, in part, to the efforts of noted musician and scholar Mick Moloney. The award is presented annually at the CCÉ's music festival and competition, the Fleadh Cheoil, and is intended to honor Mike Flanagan as an ambassador of the golden era of Irish music in America. Many members of Mike's family traveled to Ireland in 2016 to participate in the initial award ceremony. During this visit, the City of Waterford once again honored Mike's legacy with a civic reception. The contributions of Mike and his brothers were further acknowledged with the placement of a distinguished Blue Plaque on their childhood home in Waterford at One Summerhill Terrace.

== Discography ==
=== Partial discography – 78 rpm discs ===
Date	Artist	Title	Label
1920/1921	Flanagan Brothers	Rights Of Man	Gaelic
1920/1921	Flanagan Brothers	Jigs Medley	Gaelic
1921	Flanagan Brothers	Rights Of Man [Hornpipes]	Gaelic
1921	Flanagan Brothers	An' Carowath [Hornpipes]	New Republic
1921	Flanagan Brothers	Red Haired Boy	New Republic
1921	Flanagan Brothers	By The Sea [Waltz]	New Republic
1921	Flanagan Brothers	Irish Republican Airs [One Step]	New Republic
Feb 10, 1923	Flanagan Brothers	The Morning Star Intro: "The Collier's Reel"	Columbia
Feb 10, 1923	Flanagan Brothers	Medley Of Highland Flings	Columbia
Feb 10, 1923	Flanagan Brothers	The Red-Haired Boy Intro: "The Lady On The Island" [Reel Medley]	Columbia
Feb 10, 1923	Flanagan Brothers	Frieze Breetches The Cook In The Kitchen Lannigan's Ball [Jig Medley]	Columbia
March, 1923	Flanagan Brothers	Irish Barn Dance	Emerson
March, 1923	Flanagan Brothers	The Maid Is Not Twenty Yet	Emerson
April 30, 1923	Flanagan Brothers	Down The Meadows – The Rambler's Jig	Gennett
April 30, 1923	Flanagan Brothers	The Hearty Bucks Of Oranmore [Reel]	Gennett
April 30, 1923	Flanagan Brothers	Irish Boy [One Step]	Gennett
April 30, 1923	Flanagan Brothers	The Rights Of Man Intro: Hennessey's Hornpipe	Gennett
c. May 1923	Flanagan Brothers	Rakes Of Clonmel; Sarsfield's Jig	Vocalion
c. May 1923	Flanagan Brothers	Cavan Reel; Gardener's Daughter	Vocalion
July 7, 1923	Flanagan Brothers	Jenny Picking Cockles; Drowsy Maggie [Reels]	Gennett
July 7, 1923	Flanagan Brothers	Maid On The Green; The Frost Is All Over [Jigs]	Gennett
July 7, 1923	Flanagan Brothers	The Gaelic Barn Dance	Gennett
July 7, 1923	Flanagan Brothers	Holly And Ivy [Reels]	Gennett
Sept, 1923	Flanagan Brothers	Rakes Of Kildare – Intro: "Irish Washerwoman" [Jig]	Vocalion
Sept, 1923	Flanagan Brothers	Green Mountain; Teetotaler [Reels]	Vocalion
April, 1924	Flanagan Brothers	Biddy Daly's Jigs	Vocalion
April, 1924	Flanagan Brothers	The Maid That Left The County; More Power To Your Elbow [Reels]	Vocalion
c. April, 1925	Joe Flanagan	Gather The Blossoms [Medley of Jigs]	Columbia
c. April, 1925	Joe Flanagan	The Parnell Waltz	Columbia
c. April, 1925	Joe Flanagan	Medley Of Irish Polkas	Columbia
c. April, 1925	Joe Flanagan	Manchester And Fisher Medley [Hornpipe]	Columbia
July, 1925	Joe Flanagan	The Star Of Munster [Reel]	Pathe
July, 1925	Joe Flanagan	The Smash [Jig]	Pathe
c. Oct 1, 1925	Joe Flanagan	Dublin Lassies Medley [Reels]	Columbia
c. Oct 1, 1925	Joe Flanagan	Mickey The Mauler	Columbia
c. Oct 1, 1925	Joe Flanagan	Tatter Jack Welsh [Jigs]	Columbia
c. Oct 1, 1925	Joe Flanagan	Scotch Mary	Columbia
Nov, 1925	Joe Flanagan	The Lime Stone Road (Medley) [Reels]	Pathe
Nov, 1925	Joe Flanagan	Ennis' Favourite (Medley) [Hornpipes]	Pathe
April, 1926	Mike & Louis	The Boys At The Lough; The Shaskeen; The Honeymoon [Reels]	Columbia
April, 1926	Flanagan Brothers	Kerry Mills Barn Dance	Columbia
April, 1926	Flanagan Brothers	Fun At Hogan's	Columbia
April, 1926	Flanagan Brothers	Flanagan At The Racket	Columbia
Oct 25, 1926	Flanagan Brothers	The Night Pat Murphy Died	Victor
Oct 25, 1926	Flanagan Brothers	The Heart Of Man [Barn Dance]	Victor
Oct 25, 1926	Flanagan Brothers	Irish Delight	Victor
Oct 25, 1926	Flanagan Brothers	Reconciliation Reel	Victor
Nov, 1926	Michael Flanagan	Avourneen	Victor
Nov, 1926	Flanagan Brothers	Paddy In London	Victor
Nov, 1926	Flanagan Brothers	The Widow McCarthy [Comic]	Victor
Nov, 1926	Flanagan Brothers	The Flanagans At Dinty Moore's Comic]	Victor
Nov, 1926	Flanagan Brothers	Johnny Williams [Hornpipe]	Columbia
Nov, 1926	Flanagan Brothers	The Geese In The Bog (With set calls 4th Figure)	Columbia
Nov, 1926	Flanagan Brothers	The Flanagans Chase The Banshee	Columbia
Nov, 1926	Flanagan Brothers	In An Irishman's Shanty	Columbia
c. Nov, 1926	Flanagan Brothers	The Hat Me Father Wore	Banner
c. Nov, 1926	Flanagan Brothers	The Highland Fling Medley	Banner
c. Nov, 1926	Flanagan Brothers	Irish Fair Day	Banner
c. Nov, 1926	Flanagan Brothers	Green Meadows Reel	Banner
Dec, 1926	Flanagan Brothers	The Blackbird [Exhibition Hornpipe]	Victor
Dec, 1926	Flanagan Brothers	Buttermilk Mary [Medley of Jigs]	Victor
Dec, 1926	Flanagan Brothers	Reviewing St. Patrick's Day Parade	Victor
Dec, 1926	Flanagan Brothers	The Irishman, The Englishman And The Scotchman	Victor
Jan, 1927	Flanagan Brothers	An Corowath	Columbia
Jan, 1927	Flanagan Brothers	Flanagans Visit Killarney	Columbia
June, 1927	Flanagan Brothers	The Stack 'O' Barley	Columbia
Mar 23, 1927	Flanagan Brothers	Sprig Of Shillelagh [Polka]	Columbia
Mar 23, 1927	Flanagan Brothers	A Quiet Night At Flanagan's	Columbia
Mar 23, 1927	Flanagan Brothers	Erin Go' Bragh [Comic]	Columbia
June, 1927	Flanagan Brothers	Flanagan's Naturalization Troubles [Talking with Accordion Accomp]	Columbia
June, 1927	Flanagan Brothers	Tickling The Keys Medley	Columbia
June, 1927	Flanagan Brothers	Mick From Tralee	Columbia
June, 1927	Flanagan Brothers	A Bunch Of Forget-Me-Nots [Waltz]	Columbia
June, 1927	Flanagan Brothers	Kilgannon's Dream [Medley of Jigs]	Columbia
June, 1927	Flanagan Brothers	Cod Liver Oil	Columbia
June, 1927	Joe Flanagan	Barney Come Home	Columbia
June, 1927	Flanagan Brothers	The Auld Blackthorn [Reel]	Columbia
Nov, 1927	Flanagan Brothers	Irish Washerwoman Medley [Jig]	Columbia
Nov, 1927	Flanagan Brothers	Leitrim Thrush [Reel]	Columbia
Nov, 1927	Flanagan Brothers	The Old Schoolmaster [Reel]	Columbia
Nov, 1927	Flanagan Brothers	On The Road To The Fair [No Vocal]	Columbia
Jan, 1928	Flanagan Brothers	Just Like Home – Jazz Set [No Vocal]	Columbia
Jan, 1928	Flanagan Brothers	The Sidewalks Of New York (East Side, West Side)	Columbia
Jan, 1928	Flanagan Brothers	Sweet Rosie O'Grady	Columbia
Jan, 1928	Flanagan Brothers	The I.R.A.	Columbia
Jan, 1928	Flanagan Brothers	The Banty Legged Mule	Columbia
Jan, 1928	Flanagan Brothers	Sarsfield Lilt [Jig]	Columbia
Jan, 1928	Flanagan Brothers	McGonagle Taste [Hornpipe]	Columbia
Jan, 1928	Flanagan Brothers	Flanagans At St. Patrick's Parade	Columbia
Jan, 1928	Flanagan Brothers	Ireland's 32	Columbia
Jan, 1928	Flanagan Brothers	Old Irish Barn Dance	Columbia
Jan, 1928	Flanagan Brothers	Shaskeen Reel	Columbia
Feb, 1928	Flanagan Brothers	My Irish Molly-O	Columbia
Feb, 1928	Flanagan Brothers	The Girl I Left Behind Me	Columbia
Feb, 1928	Flanagan Brothers	Around The Old Turf Fire [Mouth Organ & Jew Harp]	Columbia
May, 1928	Flanagan Brothers	You Can't Keep A Good Man Down	Columbia
May, 1928	Flanagan Brothers	Bells Of Athenry [Hornpipe]	Columbia
May, 1928	Flanagan Brothers	Kelly's House Party [Comic Scene]	Columbia
May, 1928	Flanagan Brothers	Highland Scottische	Columbia
August, 1928	Flanagan Brothers	Brian O'Lynn	Columbia
August, 1928	Flanagan Brothers	The Pretty Maid Milking Her Cow	Columbia
August, 1928	Flanagan Brothers	Over The Waves [Waltz]	Columbia
August, 1928	Flanagan Brothers	Chicken Reel; Turkey In The Straw; Arkansas Traveller [Reels]	Columbia
Sep, 1928	Flanagan Brothers	Hallelujah! I'm A Bum	Columbia
Sep, 1928	Flanagan Brothers	The Bum Song	Columbia
Sep, 1928	Flanagan Brothers	Three O'Clock In The Morning [Waltz]	Columbia
Oct, 1928	Flanagan Brothers	Tom Steel Medley [Reel]	Columbia
Jan, 1929	Flanagan Brothers	Let Ye All Be Irish To-Night	Columbia
Jan, 1929	Flanagan Brothers	Beggerman Song	Columbia
Jan, 1929	Flanagan Brothers	The Wanderer Medley [Jigs]	Columbia
Jan, 1929	Flanagan Brothers	Universal Reel Medley	Columbia
Jan, 1929	Flanagan Brothers	A Gay Caballero	Columbia
Jan, 1929	Flanagan Brothers	The Little Black Mustache	Columbia
Feb, 1929	Flanagan Brothers	The Rights Of Man [Exhibition Hornpipe]	Columbia
Feb, 1929	Flanagan Brothers	Old Time Waltz Medley	Columbia
March, 1929	Flanagan Brothers	Finnegan's Ball	Columbia
March, 1929	Flanagan Brothers	The Tipperary Christening	Columbia
March, 1929	Flanagan Brothers	Hartigan's Pride [Jig]	Columbia
March, 1929	Flanagan Brothers	Paddy Ryan's Dream [Reel]	Columbia
March, 1929	Flanagan Brothers	Highland Fling Medley [Instrumental]	Columbia
April, 1929	Flanagan Brothers	Delaney's Donkey	Columbia
May? 1929	Joe Flanagan	Kitty Wells	Columbia
June, 1929	Flanagan Brothers	The Coach Road To Sligo; Hearty Boys Of Ballymote [Jigs]	Columbia
June, 1929	Flanagan Brothers	Cavan Reel; More Power To Your Elbow [Reels]	Columbia
June, 1929	Flanagan Brothers	Flowers Of Edinburg; Soldier's Joy [Stack Dance Time]	Columbia
August, 1929	Flanagan Brothers	Twilight In Athlone [Hornpipe] [Banjo & Guitar Duet]	Columbia
August, 1929	Flanagan Brothers	Humors Of Bandon Medley [Irish Exhibition Jig]	Columbia
August, 1929	Michael Flanagan	Tickling The Strings [Two Step Banjo Solo]	Columbia
August, 1929	Flanagan Brothers	Bright Star Of Munster [Reel]	Columbia
October, 1929	Flanagan Brothers	Sullivan's Troubles [Comic]	Columbia
Nov, 1929	Flanagan Brothers	Up The Hill Of Down	Columbia
Dec?, !929	Flanagan Brothers	The New Irish Barn Dance	Columbia
Dec?, !929	Flanagan Brothers	International Echoes	Columbia
c. Dec, 1929	Flanagan Brothers	Kelly's Cow Has Got No Tail	Columbia
Jan, 1930	Flanagan Brothers	The Tunes We Love To Play On Paddys Day	Columbia
c. Jan, 1930	Joe Flanagan	Little Bridget Flynn	Columbia
Feb, 1930	Flanagan Brothers	In Our Back Yard	Columbia
Sep, 1930	Flanagan Brothers	Flanagan The Lodger	Columbia
Sep, 1930	Flanagan Brothers	Fogarty's Christmas Cake	Columbia
Sep, 1930	Flanagan Brothers	Galway Farewell Clog [Hornpipe]	Columbia
Sep, 1930	Flanagan Brothers	Garden of Daisies, The	Columbia
c. Nov, 1930	Flanagan Brothers	Out On The Ocean Medley [No Vocal]	Columbia
c. Nov, 1930	Flanagan Brothers	The Moving Bogs Medley [Reels]	Columbia
c. Nov, 1930	Flanagan Brothers	The Darkey's Dream [Irish Fox-Trot]	Columbia
c. Nov, 1930	Flanagan Brothers	The Grand Hotel In Castlebar	Columbia
c. Nov, 1930	Flanagan Brothers	The Bologna Song [Comic Song]	Columbia
c. Nov, 1930	Flanagan Brothers	Irish Fair Day	Columbia
Dec, 1930	Flanagan Brothers	Maloney Puts His Name Above The Door	Columbia
Dec/Jan, 1930/1931	Flanagan Brothers	Lannigan's Ball	Columbia
Dec/Jan, 1930/1931	Flanagan Brothers	The Contrary Reel	Columbia
Dec/Jan, 1930/1931	Flanagan Brothers	Irish Boy March [March]	Columbia
Dec/Jan, 1930/1931	Flanagan Brothers	The Old Boreen	Columbia
Jan, 1931	Flanagan Brothers	Haley's Double Header [No Vocal]	Columbia
c. May, 1931	Irish Big Four	Salamanca; The Slasher [Reels]	Columbia
c. May, 1931	Irish Big Four	Cuckoo's Nest; Down The Meadows [Reels]	Columbia
c. May, 1931	Irish Big Four	Scholar Medley [Reels]	Columbia
c. May, 1931	Irish Big Four	By Heck [Barn Dance]	Columbia
c. May, 1931	Irish Big Four	The Bartender; Teetotaler [Reels]	N.Av
c. May, 1931	Irish Big Four	Buttermilk Mary Medley [Jigs]	N.Av
1933	Joe Flanagan	Half Crown Song	Columbia
1933	Joe Flanagan	Sunshine; Off To California [Hornpipes]	Columbia

=== Later compilations ===
- An Irish Delight (1979) – Topic Records
- The Tunes We Like To Play On Paddy's Day (1996) – Viva Voce

=== Compilations with others ===
- 2010 Irish Dance Music – Topic
- 2010 Past Masters of Irish Dance Music – Topic
- 2010 Round The House and Mind The Dresser – Topic

In 2009 My Irish Molly O from The Flanagan Brothers was included in Topic Records 70 year anniversary boxed set Three Score and Ten as track seven on the third CD.
