= Never Been There Before =

Newfoundland folk song

Never Been There Before is a popular Newfoundland folk song. It was written by Johnny Burke (1851–1930), a popular St. John's balladeer.

== Lyrics ==
She'd never been there before
She'd never been there before
A young man asked her recently
To come and sit upon his knee
He tickled her in the ribs
And he filled her with delight
She'd never been there before
But now she goes there every night

Me sister Sue was always such a silly little goon
She never really understood the proper way to swoon
A young man asked her recently to sit upon his knee
When she at last consented she behaved so bashfully

She'd never been there before
She'd never been there before
She seemed so proud when Mr Brown
Began to bounce her up and down
He tickled her in the ribs
And he thrilled her with delight
She'd never been there before
But now she goes there every night

A friend of mine whose husband was a stingy little man
Resolved herself to work upon a good old fashion plan
While Willy was sleeping fast that night she said I'll take a chance
Got out of bed and dove into the pockets of Willy's pants

She'd never been there before
She'd never been there before
But she was awful pleased to see
That Willy was sleeping peacefully
She only took half a buck
And it filled her with delight
She'd never been there before
But now she goes there every night

One night a burly policeman was walking on his beat
He happened to shine his flashlight in the alley down the street
The cook was standing in the door she said oh deary me
I feel so terrible lonesome will you keep me company

He'd never been there before
He'd never been there before
He gave the cook a regular treat
Along with a lovely roast of meat
He tickled her in the ribs
And he filled her with delight
She'd never been there before
But now she goes there every night

== See also ==
- List of Newfoundland songs
