= Newfoundland Drinking Songs =

Studio album by Ryan's Fancy
- Released: 1973
- Recorded: Audio Atlantic
- Genre: Folk
- Label: Audat
- Producer: Ryan's Fancy

Ryan's Fancy chronology
Looking Back (1972)	Newfoundland Drinking Songs (1973)	Times to Remember (1973)

Newfoundland Drinking Songs is an album by Ryan's Fancy released in 1973.

== Track listing ==
1. "Intro"
2. "The Night Paddy Murphy Died"
3. "Nancy Whiskey"
4. "Miss McLeod's Reel"
5. "The Northern Lights of Old Aberdeen"
6. "Rocky Road To Dublin"
7. "I'm A Rover"
8. "The Ryans and the Pittmans"
9. "Finnegan's Wake"
10. "Twenty One Years"
11. "Road to the Isles & The Beggerman"
12. "Butcher Boy"
13. "Fare Thee Well Enniskillen"
