= Heave Away =

Traditional sea shanty

"Heave Away" (also Heave Away, My Johnny) is a traditional sea shanty, with origins unknown. The song is recorded in the Vaughn Williams Memorial Library with Roud number 616.

== History ==
The earliest print version of the song is from a collection of Cecil Sharp in 1904 from Captain Vickery of Minehead, Somerset, England.

The song was described by American folklorist Kenneth S. Goldstein as, "A favourite shanty for windlass work, when the ship was being warped out of harbour at the start of a trip."

== Recordings ==
In 1957, it was recorded as "Heave Away, My Johnny" by English folk singers A. L. Lloyd and Ewan MacColl on their album of whaling ballads and songs, Thar She Blows. In 1964, English folk singer Lou Killen sang "Heave Away My Johnny" in 1964 on the Topic anthology of sea songs and shanties, Farewell Nancy.

In 1998, it was recorded as "Heave Away" by Canadian group The Fables on their debut album Tear the House Down. The Fables version has enjoyed continued popularity in their home province of Newfoundland and Labrador and in Atlantic Canada in general, with Canada using it as their goal song during the 2023 IIHF World Junior Championship held in Halifax, Nova Scotia and Moncton, New Brunswick. The song had previously been used by the Toronto Maple Leafs in the mid-2000s as their goal song. The song is also used as the goal song for the Halifax Thunderbirds of the National Lacrosse League.

The song was featured into the Broadway musical, "Come From Away."

== See also ==
- List of Newfoundland songs
