= Denis Ryan (singer) =

Irish-Canadian folk musician

- Born: Newport, County Tipperary, Ireland
- Genres: Folk
- Occupations: Singer, instrumentalist
- Instrument: Tin whistle
- Formerly of: Ryan's Fancy

Denis Ryan is an Irish-Canadian folk musician, best known as a member of the popular Irish-Newfoundland band trio Ryan's Fancy, and as a singer and tin whistle player.

== Biography ==
Born in Newport, County Tipperary, Ireland, Ryan immigrated to Toronto in 1969. He formed the Irish- Canadian folk group Ryan's Fancy in 1970 with Fergus O'Byrne and the late Dermot O'Reilly and moved to St. John's, Newfoundland, in 1971 to attend Memorial University where he graduated with a degree in folklore. Ryan and his family moved to Halifax, Nova Scotia, in 1980 and have been residing there ever since.

Ryan's career has spanned more than 40 years. He has performed all over the world, appearing in over two hundred television shows in both Ireland, USA, and Canada, including 78 television shows with the Ryan's Fancy Tommy Makem syndicated series. The group also had a national television series on CBC in 1976. Other television shows included Ryan's Fancy on Campus in the late 1970s and early 1980s, also on the CBC. They recorded 13 albums. In early 2011, Ryan's Fancy released their 40th Anniversary Collection.

Songs that Ryan made popular in Ireland and Canada in the 1970s and 1980s include "Newport Town", "Mulchair River", "Logy Bay", "Sweet Forget Me Not", and "Now I'm Sixty Four". Ryan's versions of "Dark Island" and "Let me Fish off Cape St. Mary's" were to many the group's most popular songs, and became Ryan's signature pieces. As a singer, he has performed for former Prime Minister Pierre Trudeau, US president Ronald Reagan, Queen Elizabeth, and has sung with former Prime Minister Brian Mulroney.

In 1983, Ryan's Fancy disbanded and Ryan has since been working in the Investment Management business. He is involved with numerous community projects including serving as the national chairman of the fundraising committee of the Darcy McGee Chair of Irish Studies at St. Mary's University, and was also on the Board of Governors for St. FX University. In 1994, he received an honorary degree, Doctor of Letters from St. Mary's University in Halifax, Nova Scotia. Ryan was the founder of Nova Scotian Crystal, Canada's only hand cut mouth-blown crystal manufacturer. Ryan recorded various solo CD projects, including Mist Covered Mountains, Newport Town, Here and There, and Cape St. Marys.

In the mid-1990s, Ryan hosted the CBC television series Up on the Roof. He played the role of a Judge in the Trailer Park Boys movie Live in Ireland. He became notorious in 2010 thanks to his appearance in a popular YouTube video about bankers. In October 2015, he hosted a television documentary about the Canadian painter Tom Forrestall. In May 2021, he received an honorary Doctor of Letters from Cape Breton University.

== Discography ==
=== Solo ===
- Mist Covered Mountains
- Here and There
- Let Me Fish Off Cape St.Mary's
- Newport Town with Denis Carey.

=== With Ryan's Fancy ===
Ryan's Fancy Discography
