= All Around the Circle =

- Genre: variety television
- Starring: Carol Brothers; John White; Ray Walsh; Don Randell; Doug Laite
- Country of origin: Canada
- Original language: English

Production
- Producers: Wayne Guzzwell; Kevin O'Connell
- Production location: Newfoundland and Labrador
- Running time: 30 minutes

Original release
- Network: CBC Television
- Release: 1964 – 1975

All Around the Circle is a Canadian variety television series which featured the music of Newfoundland and Labrador, performed in St. John's.

== See also ==
- I's the B'y, contains the lyrics "All around the circle!" from which the show got its name
