= Sam Moran =

Australian entertainer (born 1978)

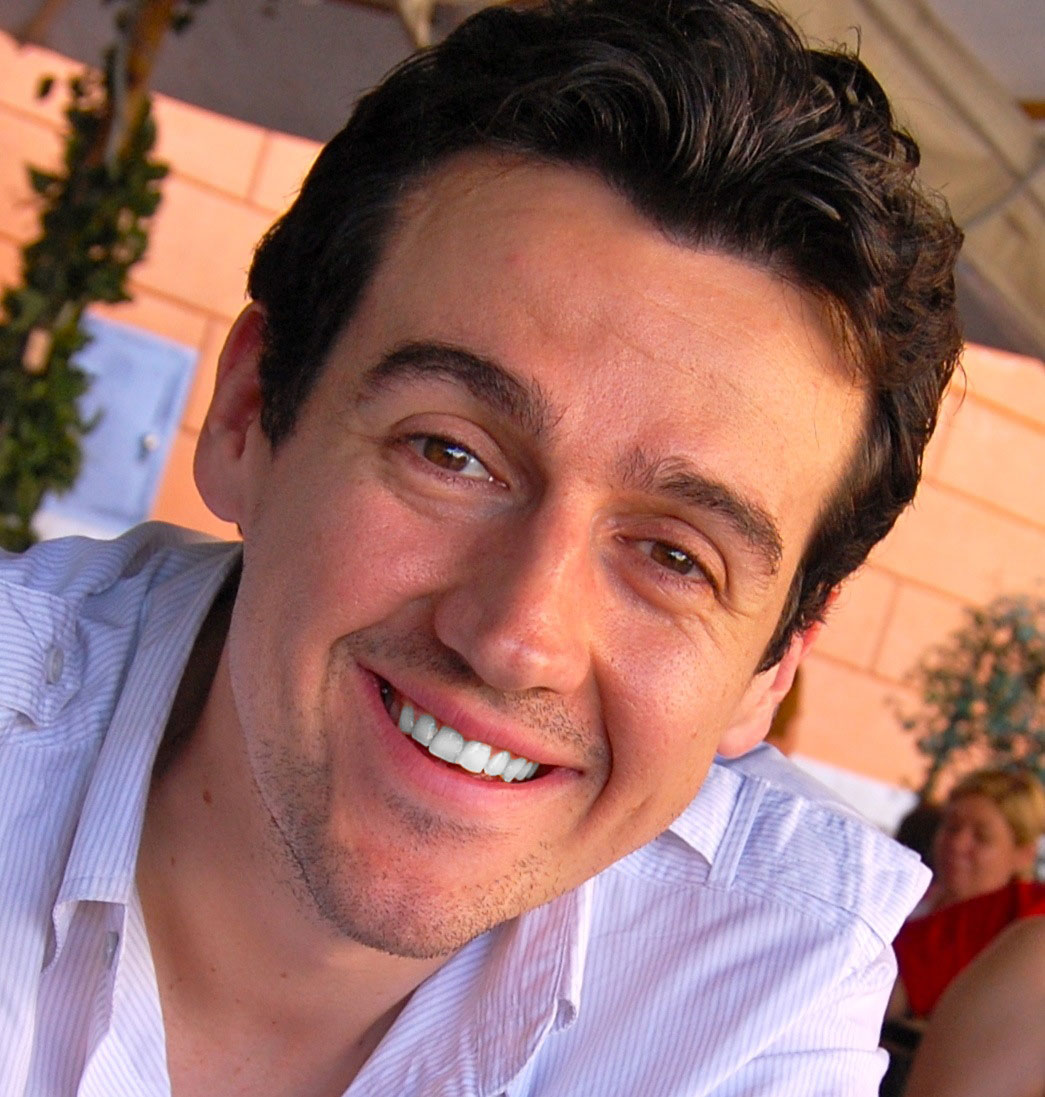
- Moran in 2008

Background information
- Born: Samuel Alexander Moran; 4 April 1978 (age 48); Sydney, New South Wales, Australia
- Genres: Children's; pop
- Occupations: Musician; dancer; actor; singer
- Instruments: Vocals; trumpet; guitar; drums; ukulele
- Years active: 1998–present
- Labels: Sony Music Australia; Republic Records
- Spouse: Lyn Stuckey (m. 2006; div. 2018)
- Partner: Jessica Vergara (2018–present)
- Website: SamMoran.com

Samuel Alexander Moran (born 4 April 1978) is an Australian entertainer best known for having been a member of the children's band The Wiggles from 2006 to 2012.

== Early life ==
Moran was born on 4 April 1978, in Sydney, New South Wales, and he was raised in Wagga Wagga.

== Career ==
Moran studied classical voice and music education at the Sydney Conservatorium of Music with the purpose of becoming a high school music teacher, and began performing in plays and musicals while still a student.

=== The Wiggles ===
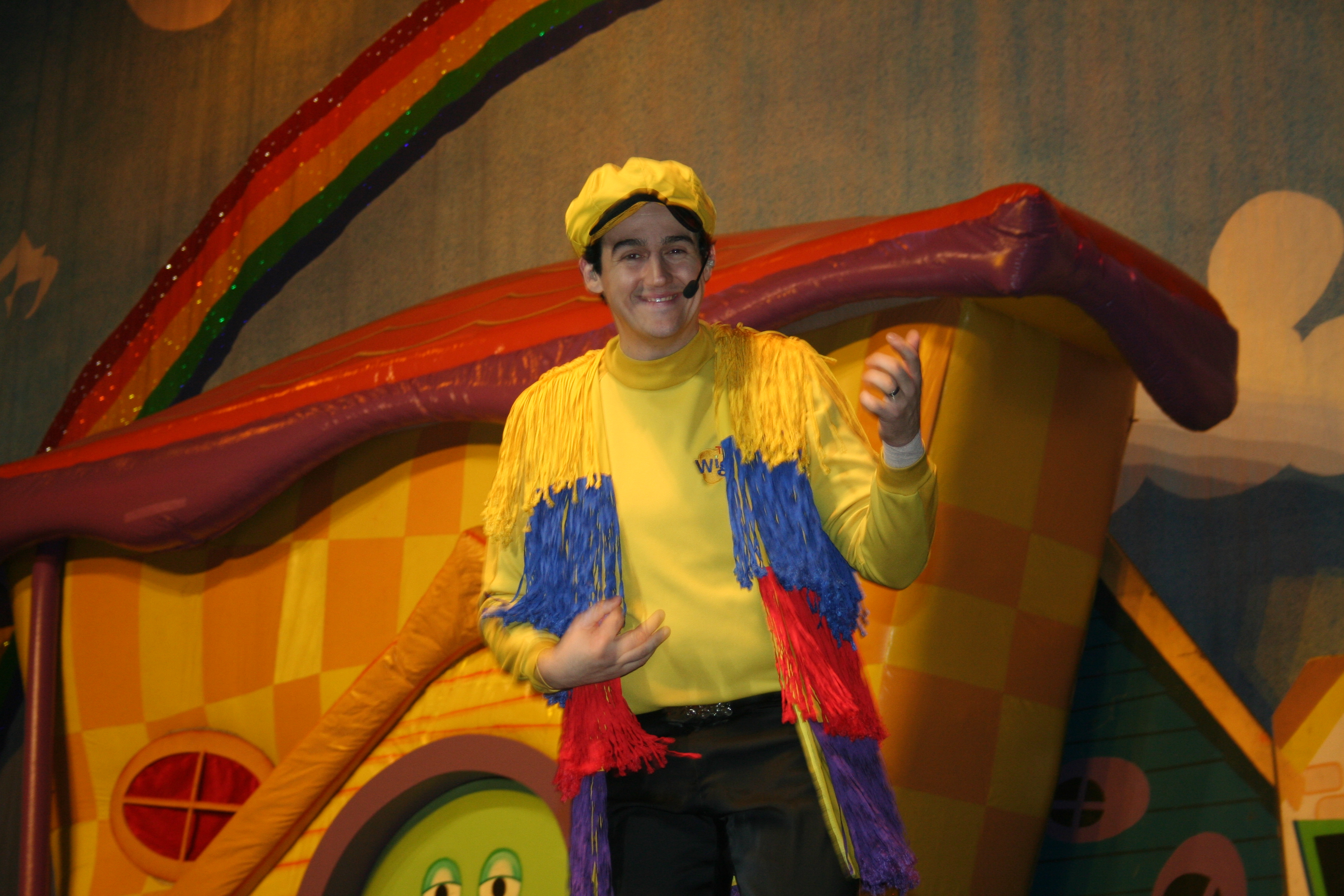
Moran performing with the Wiggles in 2007

Moran's involvement with the Wiggles began when he appeared in "Haste to the Wedding" and "Evie and the Birdman", both written by John Field, Anthony Field's brother and songwriter for the Wiggles. Moran began performing with the Wiggles in 1998, hosting and touring with the "Dorothy the Dinosaur Show" throughout Australia and New Zealand, in small venues the Wiggles "had grown too big for". He played Professor Singalottasonga and Dapper Dave in the group's TV series. In 2002, Moran became Greg Page's understudy and filled in for Page over 150 times. Page was advised by his doctors not to travel, so Moran performed in his place during the group's fall 2006 US tour. Moran reported that he was asked to permanently join the Wiggles "a couple of days" before Page announced his retirement in November 2006. Moran's shtick on stage was losing things.

Although the transition from Page to Moran as the group's lead singer, which Moran has called "probably one of the most physically demanding roles in mainstream entertainment", was "smooth" for the young children of the Wiggles' audience, it was more difficult for their parents. Bandmate Murray Cook reported that Moran did "amazingly well" as a Wiggle, and that the addition of Moran changed their sound, forced the group to "rethink things", and made the band stronger. Although Moran struggled with the spontaneity of the Wiggles' stage performances, Cook said, "We've never felt like we had to carry him or anything. He's a smart guy. But it is a bit different, just having a different person on stage". Moran's background in musical theatre was different from those of his bandmates, so the Wiggles had to change the way they recorded their music. At sound checks, their practice was to "kind of jam on things", but Moran often did not know the songs the other three used at those times. Cook reported that it took some time for Moran, but a year after Page's retirement stated, "We're slowly educating each other".

Along with the original members of the Wiggles, Moran was awarded an Honorary PhD in Children's Education and Psychology from Macquarie University in 2009.

In 2011, Sam Moran and the original Wiggles were inducted into the ARIA Hall of Fame for the band's "20 year commitment to children's music and entertainment". During Moran's time as the lead singer of the Wiggles, the group never lost an ARIA Award.

In January 2012, and amidst a great deal of controversy, the Wiggles announced that Greg Page had regained his health and was returning to his role as the Yellow Wiggle. As part of his severance package, Moran was given unconditional use of Hot Potato Studios, plus royalties for any of his songs.

=== Solo projects ===
Moran released his first solo album, Colour of Love, through Sony Music Australia in 2010. The album consists of covers of well known love songs, including a duet of the Beach Boys' "God Only Knows" with Australian jazz vocalist Emma Pask.

==== Colour of Love ====
Colour of Love

Studio album by Sam Moran
- Released: 9 April 2010
- Studio: Sony Music Studios
- Genre: Pop
- Length: 44:21
- Label: Sony Music
- Producer: Rod McCormack

Sam Moran chronology
Colour of Love (2010)	Play Along With Sam (2013)

===== Track listing =====
No.	Title	Original artist	Length
1.	"You Make Lovin' Fun"	Fleetwood Mac	3:48
2.	"Unchained Melody"	Todd Duncan	3:26
3.	"Wonderful Tonight"	Eric Clapton	3:41
4.	"Fire and Rain"	James Taylor	3:57
5.	"God Only Knows" (ft. Emma Pask)	The Beach Boys	3:05
6.	"More Than Words"	Extreme	5:02
7.	"(What a) Wonderful World"	Sam Cooke	3:14
8.	"Sara Smile"	Hall & Oates	3:25
9.	"Hello"	Lionel Richie	3:55
10.	"The Scientist"	Coldplay	4:00
11.	"Baby, Now That I've Found You"	The Foundations	3:33
12.	"She's Got a Way"	Billy Joel	3:15
Total length:			44:21

Moran performed "Advance Australia Fair" at the first game of the 2010 NRL State of Origin.

=== Play Along with Sam ===
In May 2013, Moran returned to children's television hosting a new preschool series, Play Along with Sam, on Nickelodeon's sister channel Nick Jr. Play Along with Sam is an educational music block programme that airs every weekday morning 10:00AM until midday before Ready, Steady, Dance replaced it and also in the evening from 6:30PM to 8:00PM, wrapped around top rating programmes. It screened until 2021.

Its companion album was nominated for an ARIA Music Award for Best Children's Album in 2013. The show also received an ASTRA Awards nomination for Most Outstanding Children's Program or Event, while Moran was nominated for Best New Talent. The show was also nominated for the TV Week Logie Award for Outstanding Children's Program.

In 2015, Moran won the ARIA Music Award for Best Children's Album, beating his former bandmates, the Wiggles. In his acceptance speech he said "...I've often wondered what I might say, were I ever fortunate enough to be in this position. Standing here now... with this... I realise I no longer need to say those things..." alluding to his unceremonious re-replacement in his former group.

In 2018, GQ Australia included Sam Moran on their list of the Best-dressed Gents at the 32nd ARIA Awards. Moran was nominated for Best Children's Album that year.

== Personal life ==
Before he became a professional singer and performer, due to his "love of gadgets", Moran seriously considered going into information technology as a career. He is a fan of the Australian Football League team the Sydney Swans. He is also "a keen cook". He married American born Lyn Stuckey, a dancer with the Wiggles in 2006. They met when appearing together on the "Dorothy the Dinosaur Show", when Stuckey played Dorothy the Dinosaur. Their daughter was born at the beginning of 2010 in Sydney. The couple subsequently separated and later divorced in 2018.

In 2020, he announced on his official social media pages that he was expecting his second child with new partner, Jessica Vergara, later in the year. The child was born on 30 October 2020.

Moran was diagnosed with clinical depression in 2015.

== Discography ==
Studio albums

- Colour of Love (2010)
- Play Along with Sam (2013)
- We're Gonna Dance! (2014)
- BOO! (2015)
- Best. Day. Ever! (2016)
- Santa's Coming! (2017)
- All The Feels (2023)

== Filmography ==
- Play Along with Sam (2013–2021) – Host

== Awards and nominations ==
Year	Nominee / work	Award	Result
2007	Pop Go the Wiggles!	ARIA Awards: Best Children's Album	Won
2008	You Make Me Feel Like Dancing	ARIA Awards: Best Children's Album	Won
2009	Go Bananas!	ARIA Awards: Best Children's Album	Won
2010	Let's Eat	ARIA Awards: Best Children's Album	Won
2011	Ukulele Baby!	ARIA Awards: Best Children's Album	Won
2011	"The Wiggles"	ARIA Awards: ARIA Hall of Fame	Won
2013	Play Along with Sam	ARIA Awards: Best Children's Album	Nominated
2014	Sam Moran	ASTRA Award: Best New Talent	Nominated
2014	Play Along with Sam	TV Week Logie Award: Outstanding Children's Program	Nominated
2014	We're Gonna Dance	ARIA Awards: Best Children's Album	Nominated
2015	BOO!	ARIA Awards: Best Children's Album	Won
2016	Play Along with Sam	TV Week Logie Award: Most Outstanding Children's Program	Nominated
2016	BEST. DAY. EVER!	ARIA Awards: Best Children's Album	Nominated
2018	Santa's Coming!	ARIA Awards: Best Children's Album	Nominated
