= The Ennis Sisters =

Canadian musical family group

- Origin: St. John's, Newfoundland and Labrador, Canada
- Genres: Celtic music Folk rock Roots music Country pop
- Years active: 1997–present
- Labels: Ennis Sisters (2000); Warner Canada (2004); Rounder Records (2003); Open Road (2007)
- Members: Maureen Ennis; Karen Ennis; Teresa Ennis
- Website: https://theennissisters.com

The Ennis Sisters are a Canadian musical family group from St. John's, Newfoundland and Labrador, active since 1997. The group consists of three sisters Maureen, Karen, and Teresa Ennis and performs in genres including Celtic music, folk rock, roots music, and country pop.

The trio rose to prominence in the late 1990s, releasing their debut album ''Red is the Rose'' in 1997, which sold more than 40,000 copies and was named Best Folk Album by the Music Industry Association of Newfoundland & Labrador. In 1999, Maclean's magazine named them one of the Top 100 young Canadians to watch. They won a Juno Award for Best New Country Artist/Group in 2002 and have received multiple East Coast Music Awards throughout their career.

== Biography ==
The Ennis Sisters, Maureen, Karen and Teresa, started playing music at a young age, encouraged by their father John and their mother Ceilie. The trio released their first album, Red is the Rose, on June 25, 1997. The album sold 15,000 copies within 18 months of release, and has gone on to sell more than 40,000 units. By the end of the year, the album was named Best Folk Album by the Music Industry Association of Newfoundland & Labrador (MIA). The following year, they received Female Artists of the Year and Group of the Year awards from the MIA.

The Ennis Sisters released their second album, Christmas on Ennis Road, in 1998. The album also landed the girls their own Christmas special on CBC, An Ennis Road Christmas. In 1999, Maclean's magazine named the trio one of the Top 100 young Canadians to watch.

They returned to the studio to record their third album, Three, in 2000. The same year, they received an East Coast Music Association (ECMA) award for Album of the Year. The album was also named Album of the Year by the MIA. In the spring of 2000, the group signed with Natalie MacMaster's manager Andre Bourgeois. The group worked with Bourgeois from 2000 until late 2003. At the 2001 ECMA Awards in Charlottetown, Prince Edward Island, held on February 11, the girls were named Roots/Traditional Group of the Year. That same weekend, The Ennis Sisters received a two-album record deal from Warner Music Canada. They began recording their major label debut with producer Tim Thorney at Great Big Music Studios.

The Ennis Sisters' fourth album, simply titled The Ennis Sisters, was released on October 9, 2001. The first single, "It's Not About You," reached the top 5 on Canadian Country Radio, and the top 10 on Canadian adult contemporary radio. The video was played on both MuchMoreMusic and CMT in Canada. In 2002, Maureen won the Society of Composers, Authors, and Music Publishers of Canada (SOCAN) award for top grossing Canadian Country Song of the Year for the album's second single, "I'd Never Walk Away." That same year, the Ennis' won a Juno Award for Best New Country Artist/Group. They were once again named Group of the Year at the 2002 ECMA Awards.

In August 2002, they signed a distribution deal with Rounder Records to re-release their latest album in the United States. The album, now titled It's Not About You, was released on April 15, 2003. Meanwhile, they released their fifth album in Canada, Can't Be the Same, on November 18, 2003. That 2003 release went on to win the 2004 ECMA Award for Best Roots/Traditional Group Recording.

The Ennis Sisters released the album Be Here for a While in 2007. Youngest Ennis sister, Teresa Ennis, plans release of new recording, 'Space', late in summer 2007. The project is not intended to be a departure from the group but a side project recorded during down time between work with the group.

== Discography ==
=== Albums ===
Year	Album
1997	Red is the Rose
1998	Christmas on Ennis Road
2000	Three
2001	The Ennis Sisters
2003	It's Not About You
2003	Can't Be the Same
2007	Be Here for a While
2015	Stages
2016	Upon A Winter's Day
2018	Keeping Time

=== Singles ===
Year	Title	Album
2001	"It's Not About You"	The Ennis Sisters
2002	"I'd Never Walk Away"	The Ennis Sisters
2002	"Without You"	The Ennis Sisters
2006	"Holding On"	Be Here for a While
2006	"Give Me Love"	Be Here for a While

=== Music videos ===
Year	Video
2001	"It's Not About You"
2002	"I'd Never Walk Away"
2008	"Give Me Love"
2018	"Keeping Time"
2018	"Your Light"
2018	"Hey There, Snowflake"
2019	"California Wine"

== Awards and nominations ==
Year	Association	Category	Result
2002	Juno Awards of 2002	Best New Country Artist/Group	Won
2002	Canadian Country Music Association	Group or Duo of the Year	Nominated
2002	Canadian Country Music Association	Chevy Trucks Rising Star Award	Nominated
2003	Canadian Country Music Association	Group or Duo of the Year	Nominated
