= Joan Morrissey =

- Promotional Photo

Background information
- Born: Joan Learning; January 23, 1935; St Johns, Newfoundland
- Origin: Newfoundland
- Died: January 10, 1978 (aged 42) Mount Pearl, Newfoundland, Canada
- Genres: Folk, traditional, country, Irish
- Occupation: Singer-songwriter
- Instrument: Vocals
- Years active: Early 1960s–1978
- Website: www.joanmorrissey.com

Joan Morrissey was a Newfoundland-Canadian singer.

Born in St. John's, Newfoundland on January 23, 1935, she was one of ten children. Entering the workforce at only thirteen years of age, she quickly moved up in the music industry of her home province of Newfoundland. Starting in the early 1960s, she began her career as a singer hosting and singing on local radio programs on CJON, VOCM, and CBC Radio.

== Acclaim ==
With the success of her fourth album, "Home Brew" selling 50,000 copies, and reaching gold status, Joan received honorary awards from the Newfoundland Easter Seals, followed in 1972 by a Juno nomination. As well in the same year she was awarded Newfoundland's Musical Ambassador of Good Will by the Provincial Government. Between 1969 and 1973 she appeared a number of times on variety show All Around The Circle. Many her of songs are an homage to Newfoundland lifestyle and are still heard on Canadian radio stations today. Some of her most notable songs include "Thank God We're Surrounded by Water", and "CN Bus". A recently published biography, Yes My Dear..., was nominated for the 2005 Heritage and History Award for Newfoundland and Labrador.

== Death ==
Though the events that culminated in her suicide are not certain, Joan had undergone open heart surgery in October 1977 which left scarring on her chest and legs. It was subsequently reported that she had been severely depressed since her operation and took her own life on January 10, 1978, at her home in Mount Pearl, Newfoundland.

== Discography ==
=== Studio albums ===
Title	Details
Joan Morrissey Sings All Time Country Favorites	Released: 1967
At The Admiral's Keg	Released: 1970
'Round About Christmas	Released: 1972
Home Brew	Released: 1973
Headin' Eastbound	Released: 1973

=== Compilations ===
Title	Details
Memories	Released: 1980
