= Ukulele Baby! =

2011 studio album/video by the Wiggles

Studio album by the Wiggles
- Released: 3 February 2011
- Genre: Children's music
- Label: ABC
- Producer: Anthony Field

The Wiggles chronology
Let's Eat (2010)	Ukulele Baby! (2011)	The Wiggles: Big Birthday! (2011)

Ukulele Baby! is the 33rd album by the Wiggles, featuring guest vocalist Rolf Harris and Hey Hey It's Saturday host Daryl Somers. It was released on 5 February 2011 by ABC Music distributed by Universal Music Australia & won the 2011 ARIA for Best Children's album.

== Track list ==
1. When I Strum My Ukulele
2. How Many Fingers Do I See?
3. Hula Hula Baby
4. Henry's Spinning
5. You Can Play The Ukulele
6. I'm Waving To You
7. Cluck Cluck City
8. The Good Ship Fabulous Flea (featuring Rolf Harris) (Note: "The Good Ship Fabulous Flea" was removed from digital download in July 2014 after Rolf Harris was convicted of indecent assault - Cooper, Max (1 July 2014). "Harris stripped of ARIA induction". Brisbane Times. Archived from the original on 8 August 2014.)
9. How Many You Want?
10. Hawaiian Boogie
11. Ooki Ooki Ooki Hear That Old Bouzouki
12. Hey Hey Its Saturday (featuring Daryl Somers)
13. Spagnola (Instrumental)
14. My Curly Sue Doll
15. Round And Round, Round And Round
16. Bambino (Instrumental)
17. Everybody Loves A Puppy
18. Doo, Doo-doo, Doo!
19. La Paloma
20. When I'm Painting
21. How Many Fingers Do I See? (Instrumental)
22. Toy Box
23. Il Clan Dei Sicilani (Instrumental)

== Video ==
Ukulele Baby!
- Directed by: Paul Field
- Produced by: Paul Field
- Starring: Sam Moran; Anthony Field; Murray Cook; Jeff Fatt; Rolf Harris; Daryl Somers
- Production company: The Wiggles Pty Ltd
- Distributed by: Roadshow Entertainment/ABC DVD
- Release date: 3 March 2011
- Running time: 89 minutes
- Country: Australia

Ukulele Baby! was released on ABC DVD in 2011.

=== Songs ===
1. When I Strum My Ukulele
2. Hula Hula Baby
3. How Many Fingers Do I See?
4. Henry's Spinning
5. You Can Play the Ukulele
6. I'm Waving to You
7. Cluck Cluck City
8. The Good Ship Fabulous Flea! (featuring Rolf Harris)
9. How Many You Want?
10. Hawaiian Boogie
11. Ooki, Ooki, Ooki, Hear That Old Bouzouki
12. Hey, Hey, It's Saturday (Australian Version) / Thank You, Mr. Weatherman! (American and UK Version)
13. Spagnola (Instrumental)
14. My Curly Sue Doll
15. Round and Round, Round and Round
16. Bambino (Instrumental)
17. Everybody Loves a Puppy
18. Doo, Doo-Doo, Doo!
19. La Paloma
20. When I'm Painting
21. Toy Box
