= Kelligrews Soiree =

The Kelligrews Soiree is a popular Newfoundland folk song, and it was written by Johnny Burke (1851 – 1930), a popular St. John's balladeer. It was patterned on Irish music-hall songs like "The Irish Jubilee" and "Lanigan's Ball", and makes reference to "Clara Nolan's Ball", an American vaudeville song of the nineteenth century.

The narrator of the song tells of dressing up in borrowed finery and going to the Soiree; he mentions the myriad food, curiosities, and celebrities in attendance, as well as the donnybrook that caps the festivities.

The Soiree is an annual event held in Kelligrews, now incorporated into Conception Bay South, since soon after the founding of the community.

== Lyrics ==
You may talk of Clara Nolan's Ball or anything you choose,
But it couldn't hold a snuffbox to the spree at Kelligrews;
If you want your eyeballs straightened just come out next week with me,
You'll have to wear your glasses at the Kelligrews Soiree.

There was birch rind, tar twine, cherry wine and turpentine,
Jowls and cavalances, ginger beer and tea;
Pig's feet, cat's meat, dumplings boiled up in a sheet,
Dandelion and crackie's teeth at the Kelligrews Soiree.

Oh, I borrowed Cluney's beaver as I squared my yards to sail,
And a swallow tail from Hogan that was foxy on the tail;
Billy Cuddahie's old working pants and Patsy Nolan's shoes,
And an old white vest from Fogarty to sport at Kelligrews.

There was Dan Milley, Joe Lilly, Tantan and Mrs. Tilley,
Dancing like a little filly, 'twould raise your heart to see;
Jim Brine, Dan Ryan, Flipper Smith and Caroline,
I tell you, boys, we had a time at the Kelligrews Soiree.

Oh, when I arrived at Betsy Snook's that night at half past eight,
The place was blocked with carriages stood waiting at the gate;
With Cluney's funnel upon my pate, the first words Betsy said,
"Here comes the local preacher with the pulpit on his head".

There was Bill Mews, Dan Hughes, Wilson, Taft and Teddy Roose,
While Bryant, he sat in the blues and looking hard at me;
Jim Fling, Tom King, Johnson, champion of the ring,
And all the boxers I could bring to the Kelligrews Soiree.

"The Saratoga Lancers first," Miss Betsy kindly said,
I danced with Nancy Cronin and her Granny on the Head;
And Hogan danced with Betsy, well you should have seen his shoes,
As he lashed the muskets from the rack that night at Kelligrews.

There was boiled guineas, cold guineas, bullock's heads and piccaninnies,
Everything to catch the pennies you'd break your sides to see;
Boiled duff, cold duff, apple jam was in a cuff,
I tell you, boys, we had enough at the Kelligrews Soiree.

Crooked Flavin struck the fiddler and a hand I then took in,
You should see George Cluney's beaver and it flattened to the rim;
And Hogan's coat was like a vest, the tails were gone you see,
Says I, "The Devil haul ye and your Kelligrews Soiree".

There was birch rind, tar twine, cherry wine and turpentine,
Jowls and cavalances, ginger beer and tea;
Pig's feet, cat's meat, dumplings boiled up in a sheet,
Dandelion and crackie's teeth at the Kelligrews Soiree.

== See also ==
- List of Newfoundland songs
