= Ann McNulty =

American vaudevillian performer (1887–1970)

Ann "Ma" McNulty (1887–1970), was a Melodeon-playing vaudevillian. She was widowed in 1928 in the wake of the Great Depression and was determined to support herself and her two minor children. She took to the stage with these children, who were Eileen McNulty (1915–1989), a singer and dancer, and Peter McNulty (1917–1960), a singer, dancer, violinist, pianist and, eventually, a composer of music and lyrics. Known as "The McNulty Family's Irish Showboat Revue", the trio first appeared on stage around 1932–1933 and through Ma's astute show-business acumen they almost immediately achieved a success that lasted for decades along the U.S. East Coast entertainment circuit.

The trio eventually appeared regularly on radio and at such venues as the Rockefeller Center's Radio City Music Hall, the Yorkville Casino, New York City's Leitrim House and at Rockaway Beach, Queens. For 16 consecutive years, the trio of "Ma" McNulty, Eileen McNulty and Peter McNulty sold out the Brooklyn Academy of Music's 2,109-seat Howard Gillman Opera House. In their nearly two decades of music recording for labels like Decca Records, Standard and Copley from 1938–1956, the McNulty family's "Showboat Revue" released 155 sides on 78-rpm shellac & vinyl. In 1953, they appeared through the then-new entertainment venue of television on Milton Berle's wildly popular Texaco Star Theater.

"Ma" McNulty did not appear on stage during her children's earlier duo performances. In 1926, after one theater's "professor" was unable to keep proper time for her children, "Ma" began, herself, keeping time for them from backstage on an old melodeon accordion. By 1928, she had been encouraged to perform on stage with her children. By the late 1930s, radio and motion pictures had already eclipsed vaudeville as popular entertainment there and throughout the nation. The McNulty family managed to keep the art of Irish "vaudevillian" or variety theater alive on the U.S. East Coast well into the 1950s. The McNulty family had a powerful influence on the development of the Music of Newfoundland and Labrador in its modern era. Another testament to the popularity of the McNulty Family was the impressive number of recordings they made for Decca, Standard, and Copley.

== Partial discography ==
- Likeable Loveable Leitrim Lad, composed entirely and performed in part by Peter McNulty
- When I Mowed Pat Murphy's Meadow
- A Mother's Love is a Blessing
- Boys from the County Cork
- Mother Malone
- Along the Rocky Road to Dublin
- When Rafferty Brought the Rumba to the Town of Aughnacloy

== See also ==
- Music of Newfoundland and Labrador
