= The Flummies =

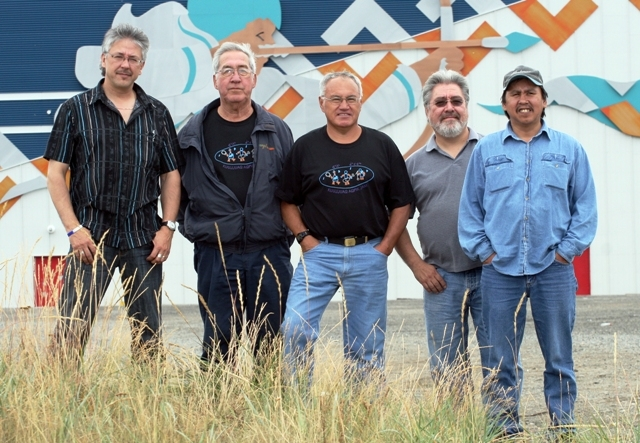

Background information
- Origin: Happy Valley-Goose Bay, Newfoundland and Labrador, Canada
- Years active: 1978–present
- Labels: World Records
- Members: Alton Best; Richard Dyson; Tunker Campbell; Leander Baikie; Sim Asivak
- Website: theflummies.com

The Flummies are a Canadian Aboriginal music group from Happy Valley-Goose Bay, Newfoundland and Labrador. Their name comes from a traditional Labrador trappers' bread (Flummies (flum`-meez`) n. - traditional Labrador trappers' bread using a mixture of flour, salt and baking powder). The group was founded in 1978 from members of the Best White Band. They have released several albums of traditional music.

The Flummies are a five-piece aboriginal music group known for recording and preserving the historical, cultural and traditional songs of Labrador. The indigenous influences of the Innu, Inuit, and Métis have been intertwined over the last 250 years, to produce songs which tell stories of the people who have survived hard times and have seen all the beauty the Labrador landscape has to offer.

Since the 1989 release of their second album, Songs of Labrador, The Flummies have sold thousands of albums and have performed around the province of Newfoundland and Labrador at many festivals and conferences. Included in their touring was a five show performance in Germany in 1989 and twenty-eight shows at the base of the CN Tower in June 1999.

== Members ==
- Alton Best on vocals, acoustic guitar and harmonica *deceased, May 11, 2011
- Richard Dyson on accordion and percussion
- Tunker Campbell on acoustic and electric lead guitars and vocals
- Leander Baikie on acoustic guitar and vocals
- Simeon Asivak on bass

== Discography ==
- Four Songs from Labrador (1986)
- Songs of Labrador (1989)
- Labradorimiut (2000)
- Way Back Then (2001)
- 25th Anniversary Album (2003)
- Songs for Christmas (2003)
- This is the Life For Me (2008)
- The River (2010)

== Awards and nominations ==
- 2000 nomination: Aboriginal Artist/Group of the Year (Music Industry Association of Newfoundland and Labrador)
- 2001 nomination: Aboriginal Artist/Group of the Year (East Coast Music Awards)
- 2002 winner: Aboriginal Artist/Group of the Year (Music Industry Association of Newfoundland and Labrador)
- 2003 nomination: Aboriginal Artist/Group of the Year (East Coast Music Awards)
- 2009 winner: Aboriginal Recording of the Year (East Coast Music Awards)
- 2012 nomination: World Recording of the Year (East Coast Music Awards)
