= Pat and Joe Byrne =

Newfoundland folk band

- Origin: St. John's, Newfoundland and Labrador, Canada
- Genres: Folk
- Years active: 1983-present
- Label: Pigeon Inlet Productions
- Past members: Patrick Byrne; Joseph Byrne; Baxter Wareham

The Pat and Joe Byrne band is a Newfoundland traditional folk music group that is well known for writing songs about the lifestyle that goes with living on the island of Newfoundland. Formed in the early 1980s and only releasing two studio albums, the group still plays shows at local bars and pubs.

== Early years ==
Pat and Joe Byrne are brothers from Placentia Bay who both moved to the capital city of Newfoundland, St. John's in 1943. Baxter Wareham had performed solo and with various groups such as The Breakwater Boys and The Wareham Brothers. Baxter has also written music for other folk groups since the 1970s.

== Recent years ==
=== Careers ===
Pat and Joe Byrne have obtained university degrees and are currently teaching at Memorial University of Newfoundland. Pat has published numerous volumes of poetry and song and performs at folk festivals and on various radio and television broadcasts. His most recent accomplishment is the editing of the three volume set, Land, Sea and Time, a widely used set that has been adopted in all high schools throughout the province of Newfoundland and Labrador.

Matthew Byrne, the son of Joe and the nephew of Pat, is also now a musician.

=== Wareham ===
Baxter Wareham, retired from a career of teaching high school, has begun following his lifelong dream to be the captain of a pilot boat and is currently working at sea out of Arnold's Cove.

== Discography ==
- Towards the Sunset (1983)
