= Matthew Byrne (musician) =

Canadian songwriter

- Birth name: Matthew Byrne
- Born: Newfoundland and Labrador, Canada
- Origin: Newfoundland and Labrador, Canada
- Genres: Folk
- Occupations: Musician; singer; songwriter
- Instruments: Vocals; guitar
- Years active: 2010–present
- Website: matthewbyrne.net

Matthew Byrne is a Canadian folk singer and guitarist, who has performed and recorded both as a solo artist and as a member of The Dardanelles.

The son of Joe Byrne of the folk duo Pat and Joe Byrne, Byrne released his debut solo album Ballads in 2010. His second album, Hearts and Heroes, was released in 2014. Byrne received two Canadian Folk Music Award nominations at the 11th Canadian Folk Music Awards in 2015, for Traditional Album and Traditional Singer, and won the award for Traditional Album.

Byrne released his third album, Horizon Lines, in 2017. He received two more CFMA nominations at the 14th Canadian Folk Music Awards in 2018, and for Traditional Album and Traditional Singer. He won the award for Traditional Album. Byrne released his fourth album, Matthew Byrne & The Lady Cove Women's Choir, in early 2020.
