= The Dardanelles (band) =

Canadian folk music group

The Dardanelles are a Canadian folk music group from Newfoundland and Labrador. Led by vocalists and guitarists Tom Power and Matthew Byrne, the band also includes Emilia Bartellas on fiddle, Aaron Collis on accordion and Rich Klaas on bodhran and percussion.

== History ==
The Dardanelles formed in 2005, and released their self-titled debut album in 2009. They received a nomination for Best Instrumental Album at the 2010 East Coast Music Awards. Their second album, The Eastern Light, followed in 2011, and received two nominations for Group Recording of the Year and Roots/Traditional Group Recording of the Year at the 2013 East Coast Music Awards. The band released their third album, In the Spring, That's the Time, in late 2020.

The band's recording of "Polly Moore", from The Eastern Light, was included on the soundtrack to the 2013 film The Grand Seduction.
