= Cod Liver Oil (song) =

"Cod Liver Oil" is a song about a traditional medicinal drink for many Newfoundlanders. Cod liver oil in the traditional way of manufacture was sun cured and served in bottles in its raw form. The song was written by Johnny Burke (1851–1930), a balladeer from St. John's, Newfoundland. It has been recorded by Burl Ives, Gordon Lightfoot, Irish band The Dubliners, and by Newfoundland folk rock band Great Big Sea on their album The Hard and the Easy.

The song is played to the melody of the traditional Irish sean-nós song "An Lacha Bacach" (Irish: The Lame Duck), as famously portrayed by Nell Ní Chróinín.

== See also ==
- List of Newfoundland songs
