= Jack Was Every Inch a Sailor =

Song
- Genre: Folk song

"Jack Was Every Inch A Sailor" is a traditional Newfoundland and Labrador folk song. It is a comical retelling of the Jonah tale, with a Newfoundland whaler as protagonist, but in this instance the whale gets his comeuppance.

It may have been adapted from a New York City music-hall song "Every Inch a Sailor", which itself was a burlesque of "HMS Pinafore".

This song was covered by Canadian children's singing group Sharon, Lois and Bram on The Elephant Show.

== Lyrics ==
Upon the isle of Newfoundland there lived a sailor boy
He was a handsome sailor lad, his father's pride and joy
He was born on board his father's ship on a dark and stormy morn
And he helped the crew harpoon a whale on the day that he was born
Chorus:

Jack was every inch a sailor
Five and twenty years a whaler
Jack was every inch a sailor
He was born upon the bright blue sea

When Jack grew up to be a man he sailed from shore to shore
He sailed his ship around the world a dozen times or more
Harpooning whales was play to him for he was very strong
And he was also very tall and his beard was very long
CHO

One night while Jack was standing watch a storm began to blow
It blew so hard that soon the ship was tossing to and fro
A great big wave rolled up to Jack and washed him to the rail
And he was tossed into the sea and swallowed by a whale
CHO

Now when that whale had swallowed Jack it soon began to shake
For this old whale had got himself a mighty stomach ache
Well now, said Jack, this poor old whale don't know what he's about
And he grabbed that whale all by the tail and pulled him inside out
CHO

Another version of the song is this:

'Twas twenty-five or thirty years since Jack first saw the light,
He came into this world of woe one dark and stormy night;
He was born on board his father's ship as she was lying to,
'Bout twenty-five or thirty miles southeast of Baccalieu.

CHORUS:

Oh, Jack was every inch a sailor,
Five and twenty years a whaler;
Jack was every inch a sailor,
He was born upon the bright blue sea.

When Jack grew up to be a man he went to the Labrador,
He fished in Indian Harbour where his father fished before;
On his returning in the fog he met a heavy gale,
And Jack was swept into the sea and swallowed by a whale.

CHORUS

Oh, the whale went straight for Baffin Bay, 'bout ninety knots an hour,
And every time he'd blow a spray he'd send it in a shower;
Oh, now, says Jack unto himself, I must see what he's about,
He caught the whale all by the tail and turned him inside out.

CHORUS

== See also ==
- List of Newfoundland songs
