= Tipatchimun =

Tipatchimun (meaning "Legend") is an Innu rock band from the Atlantic province of Newfoundland and Labrador, Canada. The band sings rock songs in the Innu language.

== Band members ==
- David Penashue on vocals/acoustic guitar
- Melvin Penashue on vocals/keyboard
- Jerome Pone on bass
- Gregory Mark on vocals/guitar

== Discography ==
- 2000 - Pishum
- 2004 - Tshenut
