= Aunt Martha's Sheep =

Canadian song by Terrence White and Arthur Butt

Aunt Martha's Sheep is a song written by Terrence White and Arthur Butt of Perry's Cove and later re-written by Ellis Coles and performed by Dick Nolan. It was primarily viewed as a slight on the Royal Canadian Mounted Police the police force for the province of Newfoundland and Labrador, Canada. The song got airplay in the 1970s, but less after that. Released in 1972 it became one of Dick Nolan's signature songs. The song tells the tale of a group of Carmanville sheep-stealers who hoodwink an investigating RCMP officer by insisting their stew was made of moose.

== The Rest Of The Story ==
Ben Weatherby, who originally produced "Aunt Martha's Sheep" for Nolan, released an album not long afterwards entitled You Can't Fool A Newfoundlander. On it, Weatherby performed a cover of "Aunt Martha's Sheep," but for a bit of fun, he wrote a continuation of the story (the title track) where the Mountie gets the last laugh. You Can't Fool A Newfoundlander won Weatherby his first gold record.

== See also ==
- List of Newfoundland songs
- Newfoundland Rangers
