= Mark Walker (songwriter) =

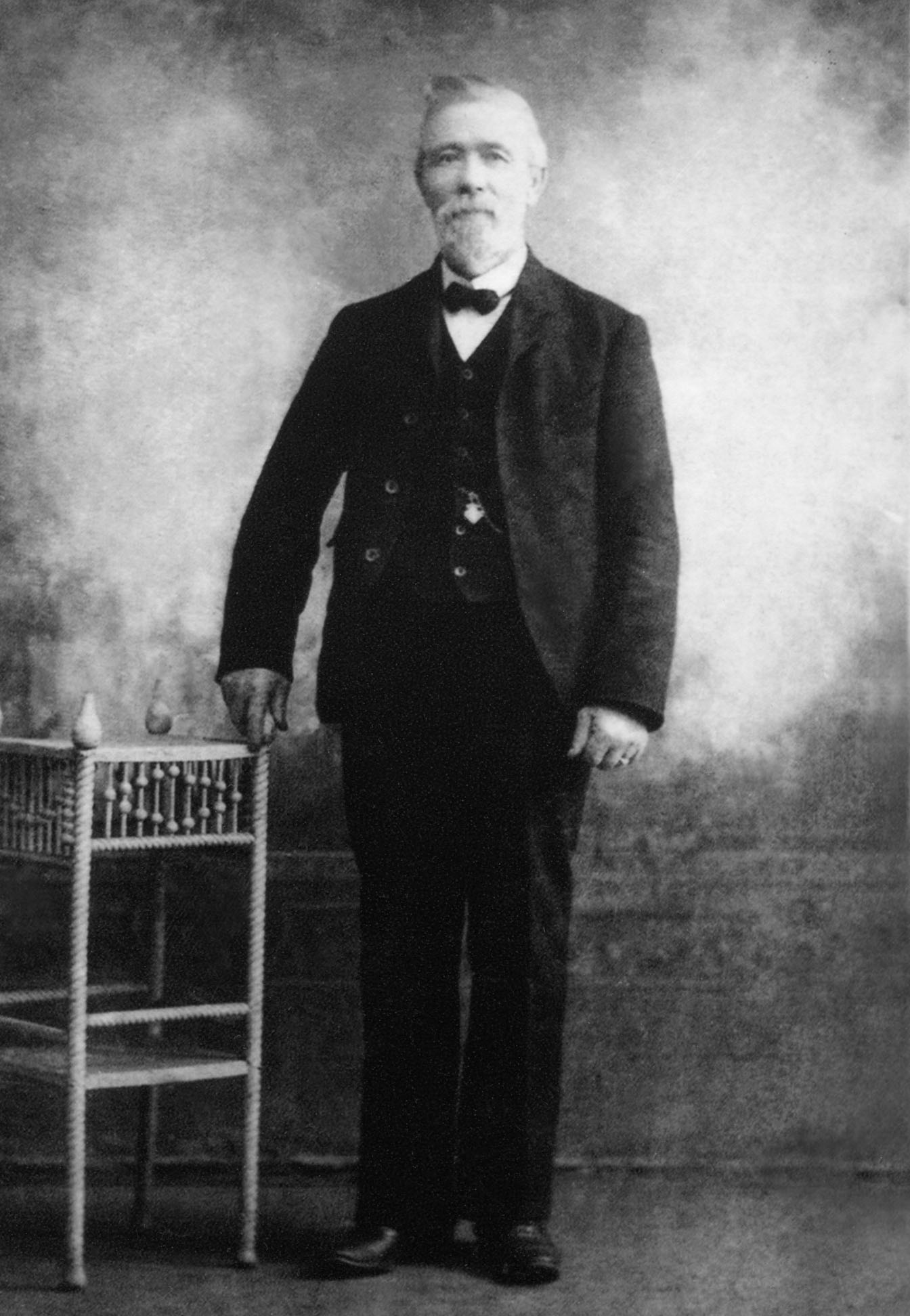

Background information
- Born: 1846; Tickle Cove, Bonavista Bay, Newfoundland
- Died: 1924 (aged 77–78) Boston, Massachusetts
- Occupations: Fisherman, songwriter

Mark Walker (1846–1924) was a fisherman and songwriter from Tickle Cove, Bonavista Bay, Newfoundland (now Newfoundland and Labrador). He is best remembered for writing the song "Tickle Cove Pond".

Walker was born in Tickle Cove, Bonavista Bay, Newfoundland and Labrador in 1846. He married Mary Downey of Coachman's Cove on August 30, 1873, and moved to Sweet Bay, Bonavista Bay around 1875. There he worked as a fisherman, a boat builder, and the first postmaster of Sweet Bay.

Some of the songs written by Mark Walker include:

- "Tickle Cove Pond"
- "The Antis of Plate Cove"
- "Fanny's Harbour Bawn"
- "Girls From Sweet Bay"
- "Nellie Neil"
- "My Little Kettle"
- "Down By Jim Long's Stage"

Some of Walker's relatives have asserted that Walker also wrote "The Star of Logy Bay," and that the song was originally called "Love's Lamentations."

It is believed that Walker wrote all of his songs before he moved to Boston in 1906.
