= Fergus O'Byrne =

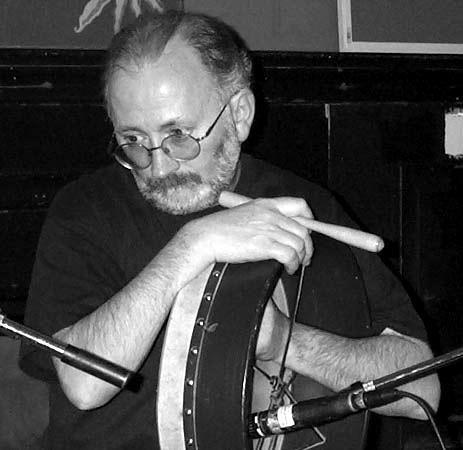

Background information
- Born: Dublin, Ireland
- Genres: Folk, Celtic music
- Occupations: Musician, singer, teacher
- Instruments: Banjo, guitar, mandolin, bodhrán, concertina

Fergus O'Byrne is a Canadian folk musician, best known as a member of the popular Irish-Newfoundland band trio Ryan's Fancy, and as a banjo, concertina and bodhrán player.

== Biography ==
O'Byrne was born in Dublin, Ireland. In the late 1940s he immigrated to Toronto, Ontario, Canada, where he met Dermot O'Reilly, Ralph O'Brien, and Gary Kavanagh and performed as a member of The Sons of Erin band. When The Sons of Erin parted ways, O'Byrne, Kavanagh, and O'Reilly completed their remaining tour commitments as O'Reilly's Men and later formed Sullivan's Gypsies with Don Sullivan.

In 1971, O'Byrne moved to St. John's, Newfoundland with the rest of the trio of Ryan's Fancy to begin working on traditional Irish folk music.

In 1983, the band broke up, and O'Byrne started a solo and freelance career, touring throughout Canada, the United States, Europe, and Hong Kong.

In 1987, O'Byrne graduated from Memorial University of Newfoundland with a degree in Education, then serving on the Board of Directors of the St. John's Folk Arts Council and the programming committee of the Newfoundland and Labrador Folk Festival in St. John's.

He became a member of the band Tickle Harbour, which won three awards at the 1999 Newfoundland Music Industry Association Awards.

O'Byrne performed regularly with Dermot O'Reilly, one of his former Ryan's Fancy bandmates, until O'Reilly's death in February 2007.

O'Byrne currently performs as part of a duo with Jim Payne, as a member of the band A Crowd of Bold Sharemen, and with his son, Fergus Brown-O'Byrne. He also facilitates a program to encourage youth participation in music, under the auspices of the St. John's Folk Arts Council; this program features a yearly workshop and concert for young traditional musicians known as "Young Folk at the Hall."

== Discography ==
- The McGrath Family—Make the Circle Wide (2012)
- Ryan's Fancy—What a Time! A Forty Year Celebration (2011)
- Jim Payne and Fergus O'Byrne—How Good Is Me Life! (2007)
- A Crowd of Bold Sharemen—Self-titled (2002)
- Ryan's Fancy—Songs from the Shows (2001)
- Tickle Harbour—Battery Included (1998)
- Various Artists—We Will Remain: Patriotic Songs of Newfoundland (1998)
- Jim Payne and Fergus O'Byrne—Wave Over Wave (1995)
- Various Artists—Another Time: The Songs of Newfoundland (1991)
- Ryan's Fancy—Irish Love Songs (1982)
- Ryan's Fancy—Dance Around This One (1981)
- Ryan's Fancy—Sea People (1980)
- Ryan's Fancy—A Time with Ryan's Fancy (1979)
- Ryan's Fancy—Brand New Songs (1977)
- Ryan's Fancy—Ryan's Fancy Live (1975)
- Ryan's Fancy—Times to Remember (1973)
- Ryan's Fancy—Newfoundland Drinking Songs (1973)
- Ryan's Fancy—Looking Back (1972)
- Ryan's Fancy—Dark Island (1971)
- Ryan's Fancy—An Irish Night at the Black Knight Lounge (1971)
- Ryan's Fancy—Curraghs, Minstrels, Rocks & Whiskey (1971)
- Sullivan's Gypsies—The Leprechaun
- Sullivan's Gypsies—Ryan's Fancy sung by Sullivan's Gypsies (1970)

== Guest appearances ==
- Glenn Vincent Breen — Over the Sea—backing vocals, "Haul Her Along" (1998)
- Vince Collins — Lifting Out the Stove (2002)
- Jim Fidler — Gypsy — backing vocals and bodhran, "Downtown Girl" (1995)
- Fine Crowd — Sucker for Good Company (1998)
- Great Big Sea — The Hard & The Easy — "Captain Kidd" (2006)
- Great Big Sea — Turn (1999)
- Jim Payne — Empty Nets (1992)
- The Punters — Will You Wait — 5-string banjo, "Here's to Life" (2000)
- The Punters — Said She Couldn't Dance — backing vocals, "Jolly Jack" (1998)
- Shanneyganock — The Long Haul — concertina, "Sammy's Bar" (1998)
- Christina Smith — Fiddle Me This (1994)
- Christina Smith and Jean Hewson — Like Ducks! (1998)
- Minnie White — The Hills of Home (1994)

== Awards ==
2004 - Dr. Helen Creighton Lifetime Achievement Award awarded to Ryan's Fancy by the East Coast Music Association

== See also ==
- Music of Newfoundland and Labrador
- Jim Payne
