= David Penashue =

Canadian musician

David Penashue is an Innu rock singer and songwriter from the Atlantic province of Newfoundland and Labrador, Canada. He is the founder of the group Tipatchimun.
