= The North Atlantic Squadron (song) =

"The North Atlantic Squadron" is an obscene drinking song associated with Canadian sailors and other groups of (primarily) men. It has a large number of traditional verses, mostly of the kind that rhyme "whore" with "Labrador", and is easily provided with new ones to suit the occasion. It is thought to have originated in the Royal Canadian Navy as the "Old Destroyer Squadron" during the First World War, although one source says the "squadron" referred to is "probably the 10th Bomber Reconnaissance Squadron" of the Royal Canadian Air Force. In any case it does not refer to the former North Atlantic Squadron of the United States Navy.

In 1975, Stompin' Tom Connors released a sanitized version on his album The North Atlantic Squadron And Other Favourites.
