= Tickle Cove Pond =

Folk song by Mark Walker

Song by Alan Mills

from the album Folk Songs of Newfoundland
- Written: 1800s
- Published: 1900s
- Released: 1953
- Genre: Folk
- Length: 3:27
- Label: Folkways
- Songwriter: Mark Walker

"Tickle Cove Pond" is a 19th-century folk song written by Mark Walker, a fisherman and songwriter from Bonavista Bay in the Colony of Newfoundland. It became popular during the 20th century after it was published in songbooks by Gerald S. Doyle.

This song is prized locally for the beauty and wit of the lyrics, which turn a mundane event into an act of heroism. Although most Newfoundland songs are passed on by ear alone, in recent years it has been recorded by Sean Sullivan & Rob Slaney (in Our Songs Vol. 2: Favorite Songs of Newfoundland & Labrador), Ron Hynes (in Another Time: The Songs Of Newfoundland), by Great Big Sea, who have released an album entitled The Hard and the Easy and by Wakami Wailers on the album River Through the Pines. They have also released a DVD with a companion CD entitled Courage & Patience & Grit in reference to a verse from Tickle Cove Pond. In addition, this song has been recorded by a St. John's Traditional Folk group called Connemara. It was also recorded by the Vermont-based ensemble Nightingale.

Additional Info: Mark Walker was born at Tickle Cove, Bonavista Bay South (BBS), Newfoundland in 1846. His father was Marcus Walker of County Tipperary, Ireland; his mother - Jane Mackey of Bonavista, Newfoundland. Mark Walker moved to Sweet Bay, BBS, in the 1880s where he worked as post master, as well as in both the fishing and lumber trades. In 1908, he and his family moved to Massachusetts, USA. Walker died in 1928.

Aside from "Tickle Cove Pond," Walker wrote other folk classics including "Fanny's Harbour Bawn," "The Antis of Plate Cove," "The Races on Tickle Cove Pond," and a second "Tickle Cove Pond" not long before his death.

According to the Encyclopedia of Newfoundland and Labrador, the Oldfords, including William Oldford (1813-1845), were prominent settlers in Salvage during the early to mid 1800s. Salvage is not far from Tickle Cove.

However, according to folklorist Philip Hiscock, there is some controversy about whether the name William Oldford might be a phonetic misinterpretation of the name William Over. The Over family, formerly of Tickle Cove, asserts that the song is about William Over. Hiscock indicates that the use of either surname in relation to this song is common.

"Tickle Cove Pond" was first recorded by Canadian folksinger Alan Mills in 1953 and released on Folk Songs of Newfoundland (Folkways Records FP 831).

== See also ==
- List of Newfoundland songs
