= Jim Payne (folk singer) =

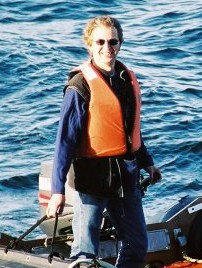
- Payne, 2002, piloting a zodiac raft

Background information
- Born: 1955 (age 69–70); Notre Dame Bay, Newfoundland, Canada
- Genres: Folk

Jim Payne (born c.1955) is a Newfoundland folk singer, best known for performing and recording many of the traditional sea shanties of Newfoundland culture. He also composed the song "Wave Over Wave" with Janis Spence and founded the record label SingSong Inc.

Payne was born in Notre Dame Bay, Newfoundland. He plays guitar, diatonic accordion, mandolin, tin whistle, and violin, and is a singer, storyteller, actor, writer, stepdancer, and teacher of traditional Newfoundland set and square dances.

== Career ==
Payne performs regularly with Fergus O'Byrne and with the band A Crowd of Bold Sharemen. He is also one-half of the musical comedy duo, "Sods'n Rhymes," with Glenn Downey.

He has directed, composed, and performed music, as well as creating soundtracks for plays, documentaries, and videos. He has performed on radio and television in Canada and abroad, and has toured throughout Canada, the US, Europe, Japan and Australia.

His recordings range from original solo efforts to contributions to anthologies of Newfoundland music. He also owns a recording company, "SingSong Inc.", which provides support and production work for recordings by other Newfoundland artists.

== SingSong, Inc. ==
Started in 1989, the label is dedicated to traditional and contemporary music, story, song, and dance that reflect the Newfoundland experience. As of 2005, the label has fourteen currently available titles, making it the largest traditional music label in the province of Newfoundland. In 2005, SingSong published a CD-ROM version of Kenneth Peacock's 1965 book Songs of the Newfoundland Outports, thus making the long out-of-print work more widely available than it had been. The CD-ROM was produced as a collaboration between Payne's company and the Canadian Museum of Civilization.

SingSong also works in conjunction with the Newfoundland Museum and the Historic Resources Division of the Department of Tourism and Culture to produce music at various music festivals. The series was developed by SingSong and presents Sunday afternoon concerts throughout the summer by performers of Newfoundland traditional folk music.

The company is also a sponsor of the Newfoundland Folk Music Club, a regular performance event in St. John's produced by The St. John's Folk Arts Council.

SingSong recordings are distributed in Canada by Tidemark Music and Distribution and by Camsco Music in the USA.

== Discography ==
- How Good Is Me Life! (with Fergus O'Byrne)
- A Crowd of Bold Sharemen (with A Crowd of Bold Sharemen)
- Wave Over Wave (with Fergus O'Byrne)
- Sods 'N Rhymes (with Glenn Downey)
- Empty Nets (solo)
- State of the Nation (music from Rising Tide Theatre)
- Southern Cross (solo)

== Awards ==
- 1997 ECMA, "Roots/Traditional Artist Nominee", Wave over Wave
- 1999 MIA, "Instrumental Album of the Year", Motion Potion (label owner, and backing vocal)
- 1998 MIA, "Album of the Year", Battery Included (label owner, and mixer)
