= Ryan's Fancy =

Irish folk music band

- Ryan's Fancy: (L-R) Fergus O'Byrne, Dermot O'Reilly, Denis Ryan

Background information
- Origin: Toronto, Ontario, Canada
- Genres: Folk
- Years active: 1971–1983
- Label: Audat
- Past members: Fergus O'Byrne; Dermot O'Reilly; Denis Ryan; James Keane
- Website: ryansfancy.com

Ryan's Fancy was an Irish folk music group active from 1971–1983. The band consisted of multi-instrumentalists Denis Ryan, Fergus O'Byrne, and Dermot O'Reilly, all of whom were Irish immigrants to Canada.

== History ==
=== 1967–1970: Early years ===
Between the years of 1967–1969, O'Byrne, O'Reilly, and Ryan emigrated to Toronto from Ireland in search of "better jobs". Not initially intent on working professionally as musicians once in Canada, their musical skills and experience, combined with their Irish heritage, provided them opportunities in the vibrant Canadian folk scene. Originally playing only at house parties and gatherings as a means of earning extra money, they quickly found themselves immersed within the Irish folk music scene in Toronto.

O'Byrne, O'Reilly, and Ryan first played together as members of the Sons of Erin. The original Sons of Erin lineup featured O'Byrne and O'Reilly along with Gary Kavanagh, Mick Crowley, Ben Brooks, and bandleader Ralph O'Brien. This lineup first toured Newfoundland in 1969, playing shows in St. John's, Gander, Grand Falls, and Labrador over a period of six weeks. Ryan joined the band following the first Newfoundland tour.

O'Byrne, O'Reilly, and Kavanaugh split from the Sons of Erin and continued touring as O'Reilly's Men. The band was short-lived and O'Reilly soon moved to Montreal. Following O'Reilly's departure, Kavanaugh and O'Byrne joined Don Sullivan and Vik Heaney to form Sullivan's Gypsies. Heaney soon left the group, while O'Reilly rejoined along with Ryan. The band toured in Newfoundland again, as well as playing shows in Manhattan in 1970.

=== 1971: Formation of Ryan's Fancy ===
Following the disbanding of Sullivan's Gypsies, O'Byrne, O'Reilly, and Ryan formed their own band, Ryan's Fancy. The name was taken from a jig composed by Ryan during their time with Sullivan's Gypsies.

Ryan's Fancy played their first show at the Nag's Head pub in Toronto. For the next several months they played gigs in both Toronto and Halifax. In March 1971, the band made their first trip to Newfoundland, playing a show at the Hotel Newfoundland.

=== 1972–1983: Move to Newfoundland and critical success ===
The trio relocated to St. John's, Newfoundland, in 1971 to attend Memorial University of Newfoundland. Making a splash in the local music scene, the group caught the interest of the Canadian Broadcasting Corporation. Produced by Jack Kellum, a television series entitled Ryan's Fancy involved the trio traveling and playing across Atlantic Canada. A second series entitled Tommy Makem and Ryan's Fancy was also produced by CBC in the 1970s. Later, accordion virtuoso James Keane from Dublin became the band's fourth member. Shortly after Keane left the band in 1983, Ryan's Fancy split. Keane moved to New York City, where he became part of the traditional scene there through the 1980s to the present day.

=== 1983–present: Disbanding and aftermath ===
When Ryan's Fancy disbanded, Ryan moved to Halifax, Nova Scotia, while O'Byrne and O'Reilly remained in St. John's.

O'Byrne returned to Newfoundland's Memorial University. In 1988, he became a director of the St. John's Folk Arts Council and between 1990 and 1991, he chaired the Newfoundland and Labrador Folk Festival.

O'Reilly started a production company called Piperstock Productions in 1993, producing 25 albums. He remained active in music post-Ryan's Fancy, frequently performing live with O'Byrne at gigs in St. John's over the years. His last performance took place the night before he died. He died of a heart attack on 17 February 2007, at age 64.

In 2004, Ryan's Fancy were awarded the Dr. Helen Creighton Lifetime Achievement Award of the East Coast Music Association.

== Members ==
- Denis Ryan - vocals, fiddle, tin whistle (1971–1983)
- Fergus O'Byrne - vocals, banjo, concertina, bodhran (1971–1983)
- Dermot O'Reilly - vocals, guitar, mandolin (1971–1983; died 2007)
- James Keane - accordion (1980–1983)

== Discography ==
- Ryan's Fancy Sung by Sullivan's Gypsies (1970)
- Curraghs, Minstrels, Rocks and Whiskey (1971)
- An Irish Night At The Black Knight Lounge (1971)
- Dark Island (1971)
- Looking Back (1972)
- Newfoundland Drinking Songs (1973)
- Times To Remember (1973)
- Ryan's Fancy Live (1975)
- Brand New Songs (1977)
- A Time With Ryan's Fancy (1979)
- Sea People (1980)
- Dance Around This One (1981)
- 15 Drink-a-Long Songs (Cassette Reissue of "An Irish Night at the Black Knight Lounge) (1982))
- Irish Love Songs (1982)
- Ryan's Fancy Live (Compact Disc Reissue of "An Irish Night at the Black Knight Lounge" and "15 Drink-a-Long Songs") (1995)
- Songs From The Shows (2001)
- What a Time! A Forty Year Celebration (2011)
