= Dick Nolan (musician) =

Canadian musician

- Born: Richard Francis Nolan; February 4, 1939; Corner Brook, Dominion of Newfoundland
- Died: December 13, 2005 (aged 66) Carbonear, Newfoundland and Labrador, Canada
- Occupations: Singer, Musician, Songwriter
- Instrument: Guitar

Richard Francis Nolan (February 4, 1939 – December 13, 2005) was a Canadian musician, from Newfoundland. Nolan was known for performing Newfoundland folk music in Toronto night clubs. During his 50-year career he released more than 40 albums and recorded over 300 tracks. He is particularly known for his song "Aunt Martha's Sheep".

== Early life ==
Nolan was born in Corner Brook. As a teenager, he performed in a local band, the Blue Valley Boys, and sang on a Corner Brook radio show. Priscilla Boutcher, the former Mayor of Corner Brook, was Nolan's sister.

== Career ==
In the 1950s, Nolan moved to Toronto, where he played with local bands and worked at several jobs. He began to record albums of the music of Johnny Cash and other country songs, earning him the nickname "The Johnny Cash of Newfoundland". His Blue Valley Boys, which included Corner Brook native Roy Penney, performed regularly at the Horseshoe Tavern, backing up visiting country singers.

In the 1960s, he switched his focus to traditional Newfoundland music and released many albums. One album, Fisherman's Boy, contained Nolan's signature song Aunt Martha's Sheep and went platinum in just three months. Another signature song of his was I's the B'y.

Two more gold albums followed; furthermore, he had a hit song in 1972 with "Home Again This Year". That year, he was the editor for the folk song collection Newfoundland Songs, published by the Bennett Brewing Company. He continued to release albums of country music and Newfoundland folk songs regularly for many years.

Nolan appeared at the Grand Ole Opry and national television programs, was nominated for a Juno Award, and hosted his own television series. In November 2005, he was awarded the Lifetime Achievement Award from the Music Industry Association of Newfoundland and Labrador.

In 2009 Dick Nolan was posthumously awarded the Dr. Helen Creighton Lifetime Achievement Award by the East Coast Music Association.

== Discography ==
=== Albums ===
| Year | Album |
|---|---|
| 1962 | I Walk the Line |
| 1962 | Home of the Blues |
| 1962 | Dick Nolan Sings |
| 1962 | On Stage at the Drake |
| 1962 | Echoes of the Atlantic |
| 1962 | Atlantic Lullaby |
| 1964 | Truck Driving Man |
| 1966 | I'se the B'y What Catches Da Fish |
| 1967 | Atlantic Christmas |
| 1967 | Moving Out |
| 1968 | I Want to Live |
| 1968 | Be True Newfoundlanders |
| 1968 | Folsom Prison and Other Johnny Cash Songs |
| 1968 | Lukey's Boat |
| 1968 | Newfie Hits |
| 1970 | Country |
| 1970 | Duet |
| 1972 | Fisherman's Boy |
| 1972 | Home Again This Year |
| 1973 | Happy Newfoundlanders |
| 1974 | Happy Anniversary Newfoundland |
| 1974 | Folk Songs of Newfoundland |
| 1975 | Dick Nolan |
| 1976 | A Country Song |
| 1977 | Best of Dick Nolan |
| 1980 | Side by Each |
| 1980 | Dick Nolan's Greatest Hits of Newfoundland |
| 1984 | Welcome Aboard |

=== Singles ===
| Year | Single | CAN Country | Album |
|---|---|---|---|
| 1965 | "Golden Rocket" | 2 | Truck Driving Man |
| 1967 | "The Fool" | 5 | Moving Out |
| 1972 | "Home Again This Year" | 9 | Home Again This Year |
| 1973 | "Me and Brother Bill" | 88 | Happy Newfoundlanders |
