= Johnny Burke (Newfoundland songwriter) =

Newfoundland poet and songwriter

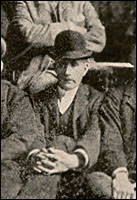
- Johnny Burke at the St. John's Regatta in 1903

Background information
- Born: 1851; St. John's, Newfoundland
- Died: August 9, 1930 (aged 78–79) St. John's, Newfoundland
- Genres: Folk
- Occupations: Singer, songwriter, poet, playwright

Johnny Burke (1851–1930) was a Newfoundland poet, singer, songwriter, and musician from St. John's, where he lived all his life. He was nicknamed the Bard of Prescott Street and wrote many popular songs that were released by folk singers in the 1930s and 1940s.

== Early life ==
Burke was born in St. John's. His father was a sea captain who died when Johnny was about fourteen; his mother also died when he was a teenager. Burke continued to live with his sister and brother on Prescott Street in St. John's until his death.

== Career ==
As a young man he worked as store clerk and salesman. He opened a small grocery store on Prescott Street.

Burke wrote hundreds of songs, many of which were comedic ballads about life in Newfoundland. He also wrote songs chronicling local events, including fires, storms and shipwrecks. He sold the lyrics to these in the form of broadside ballads from his store and on the city streets. While his lyrics were his own compositions, he often sang them using the melodies to popular songs of the day or to traditional Irish tunes.

Burke wrote a number of plays, musical comedies and operettas, mostly based happenings and issues in Newfoundland at the time, which he staged in St. John's.

In the 1960s a collection of Burke's songs was published by balladeer John White. In 1974 the Newfoundland Historical Society published a short book written by Paul Mercer about Burke's songs. The Ballads of John Burke: A Short Anthology. A musical comedy of his life, starring Ron Hynes, was performed in St. John's by The Mummers' Troupe in 1977.

Popular songs by Burke include:

- The Night Paddy Murphy Died
- Cod Liver Oil
- Murphy Broke the Pledge
- Who Shipped the Moonshine to St. John's
- The Spring Maurice Crotty Fought the Old Dog-hood
- The Kelligrews Soiree
- The Trinity Cake
- Never Been There Before
- Betsy Brennan's Blue Hen
- Excursion Around the Bay
- Little Boneen
- The Flemings of Torbay
- The Hat My Father Wore
- The Landfall of Cabot
- The Sealers Gained the Strike
- The Valley of Kilbride
