= Arthur Scammell =

Canadian writer (1913–1995)

Arthur R. Scammell
- Born: Arthur Reginald Scammell; February 12, 1913; Change Islands, Newfoundland
- Died: August 28, 1995 (aged 82); St. John's, Newfoundland, Canada
- Writing career
- Notable work: "Squid-Jiggin' Ground"

Arthur Reginald Scammell, CM (February 12, 1913 – August 28, 1995) was a Newfoundlander and Canadian writer.

== Early life and education ==
Scammell was born in Change Islands, where he grew up and received his early education. He was a schoolteacher in several Newfoundland outports during the 1930s. He left to attend McGill University and did not live full-time in Newfoundland again until 1970, after his retirement from teaching.

== Works ==
Scammell is perhaps best known for his songwriting, most notably, "Squid-Jiggin' Ground", which he wrote while still in high school, and "The Six-Horsepower Coaker". He also produced a significant body of work that was originally published in the magazine Atlantic Guardian, of which he was also a co-founder. Through essays and stories, Scammell attempted to convey some of the positive aspects of life in Newfoundland outports, which, despite their disadvantages, he saw as providing a sense of community and personal satisfaction that larger centres lacked.

A collection of Scammell's work was published as My Newfoundland in 1966.

== Awards and recognition ==
In 1987, he became a member of the Order of Canada. In 1977, he received an honorary Doctor of Laws from Memorial University of Newfoundland. In 2011, he was inducted into the Canadian Songwriters Hall of Fame (for "Squid-Jiggin' Ground"). In 1985, the Newfoundland and Labrador Arts Council established an annual award for writers in his honour.

== See also ==
- List of people of Newfoundland and Labrador

== Bibliography ==
- From Boat to Blackboard (1987)
