= Jian Ghomeshi =

Canadian broadcaster, writer, musician, and producer (born 1967)

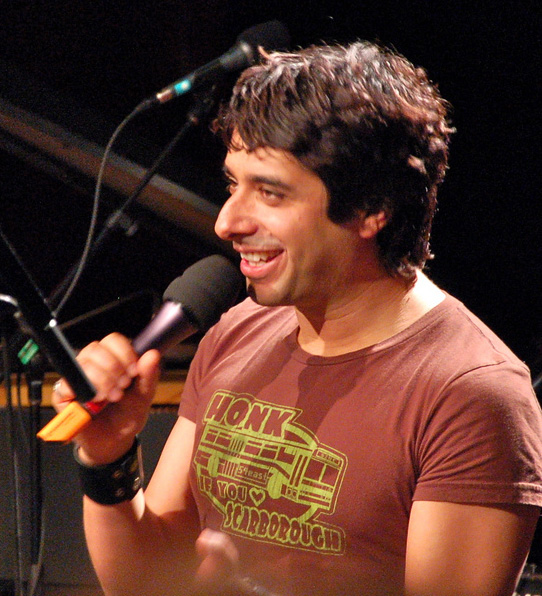
- Ghomeshi hosting his radio show Q in 2009
- Born: June 9, 1967 (age 59); London, England
- Other name: Jean Ghomeshi
- Education: York University
- Occupations: Broadcaster; Writer; Musician; Producer
- Years active: 1989–present
- Relatives: Jila Ghomeshi (sister)
- Website: roqemedia.com

Jian Ghomeshi (born June 9, 1967) is a Canadian broadcaster, writer, musician, producer and former CBC personality. From 1990 to 2000, he was a vocalist and drummer in the Thornhill-based folk-pop band Moxy Früvous. In the 2000s, he became a television and radio broadcaster. He hosted, among others, the CBC Newsworld program Play (2002–2005), the CBC Radio One program The National Playlist (2005–2006), and the CBC Radio One program Q, which he co-created and hosted from 2007 to 2014.

Ghomeshi was fired by the CBC in 2014, as allegations of sexual assault and sexual harassment came out, for which he was eventually arrested. In late 2015, Ghomeshi pleaded not guilty to the charges, and his trial began in early 2016. That March he was acquitted of five of the charges, and in May, the Crown withdrew the last remaining charge after Ghomeshi signed a peace bond and apologized to his accuser. In 2018, Ghomeshi's essay "Reflections from a Hashtag" was published in The New York Review of Books, which led to widespread criticism of the magazine.

Since 2020, Ghomeshi has been the executive producer and host of Roqe, an English-language podcast aimed at the Iranian diaspora.

== Early life ==
Jian Ghomeshi was born in London, England, to Iranian parents Farhang (Frank), a civil engineer, and Azar (Sara) Ghomeshi. His family came to Canada in 1974 when Jian was aged seven and his sister, Jila Ghomeshi, was aged ten, first living in Toronto before eventually settling in its suburb of Thornhill, Ontario. Ghomeshi described Thornhill as a "safe and quiet suburb where conformity was coveted... The dwellings all looked relatively similar on our street, and most of the houses had big lawns and nice trees". He visited pre-revolutionary Tehran twice as a child, once at age two, the other aged five.

A Muslim, Ghomeshi was born into a secular household that was initially optimistic about the 1979 Iranian Revolution but also celebrated on Christmas and Easter, and has described being raised in a largely Jewish community. With few Iranian expatriates in Canada during his youth, Ghomeshi "was extremely self-conscious of his appearance and his East London accent" and "felt different." He was bullied for his ethnicity by classmates, who called him "Blackie", "Arab", "Paki", and "terrorist".

Ghomeshi attended Thornlea Secondary School, where he was student council president. He has written that, during his teenage years, he ensured that his clothes smelled of cigarette smoke to give him "social credibility" even though he was a non-smoker, dressed "new wave" and listened to music from David Bowie, Talking Heads, and Rush. Ghomeshi had an interest in music as a student and in Grade 9 started a short-lived band with a few of his school friends called Urban Transit. His older sister, Jila, became a professor of linguistics, and their parents had initial reservations about his less-traditional career path—the distinction between busking and begging being lost on his father—but Ghomeshi has said they ultimately supported his choices.

In 1985, Ghomeshi was a committed feminist and budding progressive activist when he matriculated at York University in the theatre program (in his memoir 1982, he describes himself as a "theatre geek"). In 1990, he earned a record number of votes in his election to head of student government, which he renamed the York Federation of Students. As president, Ghomeshi instituted bilingualism and advocated for abortion rights, free tuition, and ending "institutional racism." He also cut off funding to student groups he alleged were engaged in "sexism, racism, homophobia and other exclusionary measures." While criticizing fraternities and sororities for "sexism", he supported the school's female-only Women's Centre and was one of the few men allowed inside it. When then-Prime Minister Brian Mulroney visited campus, Ghomeshi hurled macaroni at him. Progressives have since traced the roots of the "activist student coup" that subsequently took hold of York back to Ghomeshi's radical leadership.

In 1995, after taking time off to play music, Ghomeshi graduated from York with a BA in political science and a double minor in history and women's studies.

== Career ==
=== Music ===
Moxy Früvous in 1993 (left to right: Dave Matheson, Jian Ghomeshi, Murray Foster, Mike Ford)

In 1983, Ghomeshi and friends Murray Foster, Tracy Jones, Reno Manfredi, and John Ruttle formed a band called Tall New Buildings. The band released two 12" EPs and played various gigs in and outside of Toronto before breaking up around 1988. Ghomeshi, Foster and another bandmate, Mike Ford, then formed a band called The Chia Pets.

In 1989, the trio were joined by Dave Matheson to form the politically satirical folk-pop band Moxy Früvous and together recorded eight albums before going on indefinite hiatus in 2001. Moxy Früvous was originally inspired by street-performing or busking bands, and Ghomeshi and bandmates started out by playing on streets in Toronto. Ghomeshi sang and played drums. He was credited as "Jean" rather than Jian on the band's first album, but reverted to the original spelling of his name for subsequent albums. A year after forming, Moxy Früvous was opening for headline performers like Bob Dylan. The band sold over 50,000 copies of their debut independent EP in 1992 (gold in Canada). Their debut album Bargainville went platinum in Canada in 1994 after selling over 100,000 copies. The band was also nominated for a Juno Award as Band of the Year in 1994. Over the course of eight albums, they sold over 500,000 copies of their albums in Canada and the United States and made an appearance on NBC's Late Night with Conan O'Brien. Ghomeshi released his first solo EP, The First 6 Songs, in July 2001.

A 1996 video tape, revealed in 2014, suggested that Ghomeshi disdained his audiences, stating on camera that people paying to see the band's shows were "losers" and "fucking idiots". David Yuhnke, who was present at the recording, suspected that Ghomeshi was joking, recalling that the room's atmosphere was "sarcasm-laded", but added that he found it "hard to gauge entirely if he [Ghomeshi] was being serious or not".

In 1999, Ghomeshi began a correspondence with a 16-year-old girl, Sally Block, who was a fan of Moxy Früvous. This continued for three years and included in-person meetings where Ghomeshi is alleged to have been "handsy" with her. In 2002, they had a falling out and Block broke into Ghomeshi's email account. Ghomeshi sought to have her banned from "FruCon" – a Moxy Früvous convention – and wanted criminal charges to be pressed against her. She was allowed to attend FruCon, and Ghomeshi dropped the issue after her father confronted him for "carrying on this type of relationship with an underage girl".

Ghomeshi's production company, Jian Ghomeshi Productions Inc., managed musician Martina Sorbara (now of the band Dragonette) and produced music for Dar Williams. He managed electropop artist Lights from 2007 until 2014, during which time she won the Juno Award for Best New Artist and was nominated for several more. Lights initially supported Ghomeshi after he was accused of sexual abuse in 2014, but later dropped him as her manager, saying: "I rushed to defend my manager of 12 years. I am now aware that my comments appear insensitive to those impacted and for that I am deeply sorry".

=== Radio and television ===
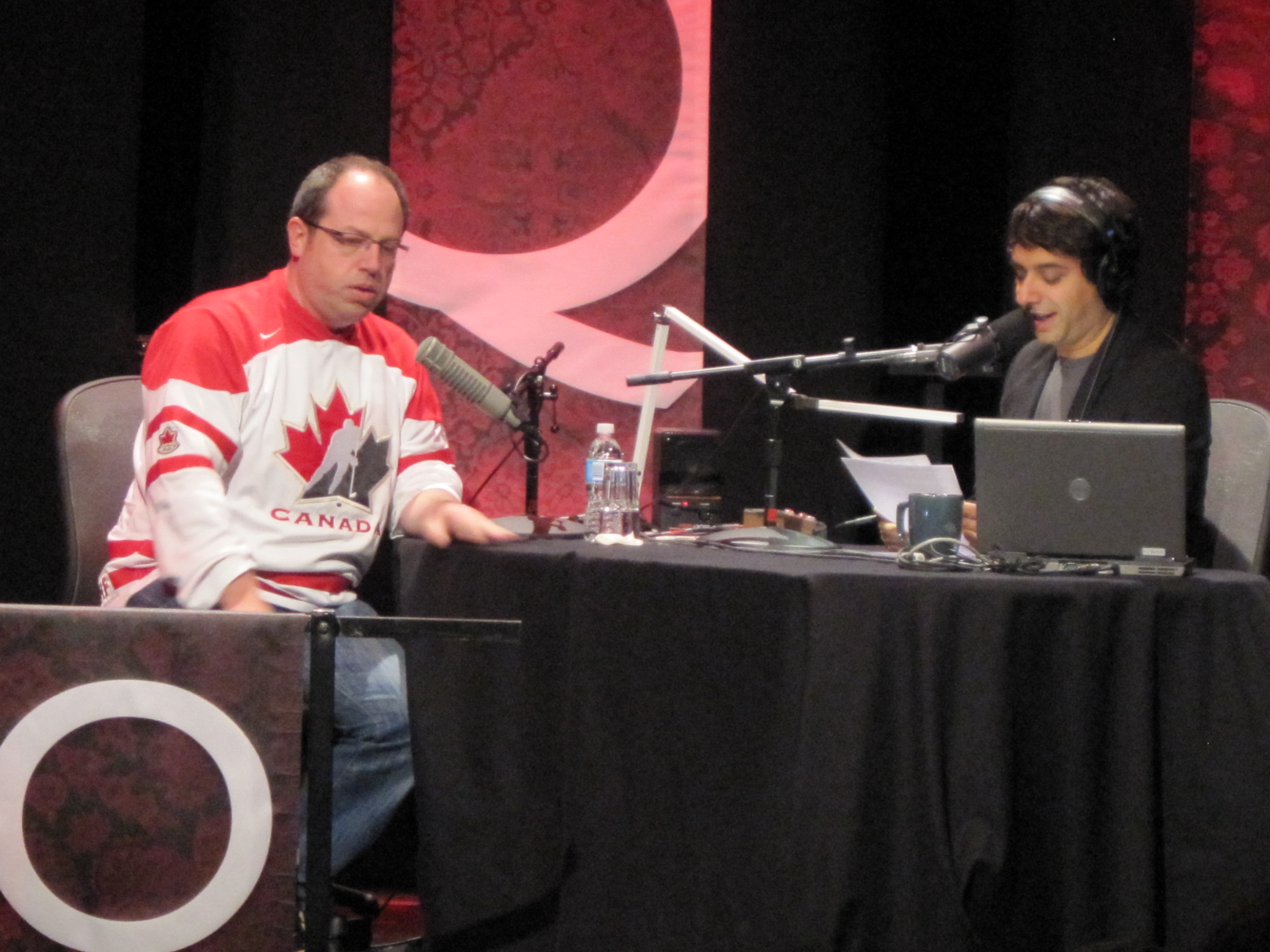
Ghomeshi interviewing Brent Butt on Q in 2010.

In 2002, Ghomeshi became host of CBC Newsworld's Play, a show about the arts in Canada and abroad. Play ran for three seasons and won a Gemini Award. He also wrote columns for The Toronto Star and The Globe and Mail. Ghomeshi hosted the radio series 50 Tracks and 50 Tracks: The Canadian Version on CBC Radio One and CBC Radio 2 (now CBC Music). From late 2005 until early 2006, he hosted a program on Radio One called The National Playlist.

From April 16, 2007, to October 26, 2014, Ghomeshi was the host of Q, a program airing twice daily on CBC Radio One, and on over 170 stations in the U.S. through Public Radio International. As the host of Q, he interviewed a range of musicians, artists, actors, and other notable figures, a list that included Woody Allen, Paul McCartney, Salman Rushdie, Barbara Walters, William Shatner, Jay-Z, Jimmy Wales, and Leonard Cohen. In 2012, Ghomeshi received the Gold Award for best talk show host at the New York Festivals' International Radio Awards. By 2013, with Q had a weekly audience of more than 2.5 million listeners weekly in Canada and 550,000 listeners in the U.S. During his time as host of Q, Ghomeshi many times booked guests who shared his agent and lawyer without disclosing this connection.

Ghomeshi hosted the 2009 Dora Mavor Moore Awards ceremony. He was set to host the November 2014 Scotiabank Giller Prize awards gala but was replaced in October by comedian Rick Mercer. That same month, he was replaced as the host of the CBC competition Canada Reads by Wab Kinew, the previous year's winner.

In December 2014 the CBC announced that it would not be rebroadcasting Ghomeshi's interviews and it would be removing them from the CBC's online archive. Reactions to this decision were swift and varied and, after further deliberations by CBC management, the decision was reversed.

==== Billy Bob Thornton interview ====
On April 8, 2009, actor and musician Billy Bob Thornton appeared with his band, The Boxmasters, on Q. In introducing Thornton, Ghomeshi mentioned Thornton's acting career and added, "he's always intended to make music, he just got sidetracked." In responding to Ghomeshi's subsequent interview questions, Thornton acted confused and gave vague, evasive answers. When asked about his musical tastes and influences as a child, Thornton answered with a rambling commentary about his favourite childhood magazine, Famous Monsters of Filmland. Later in the interview, Thornton said that the reason for his uncooperative answers was that Ghomeshi had been "instructed not to discuss" his film career but had done so.

Thornton said that Canadians did not get up and move or throw things at concerts, and referred to them as "mashed potatoes without the gravy". Ghomeshi replied, "Oh, we've got some gravy up here as well." Ghomeshi described the interview as one of the most difficult he has conducted. He compared the international media exposure that followed the interview to being "in the middle of a tsunami". After the show, Canadians responded to Ghomeshi's "professionalism and the manner in which he handled the situation ... [and] the show received more than 100,000 e-mails with almost unanimous praise for the host".

==== Dismissal from the CBC ====
In the spring of 2014, Ghomeshi advised his employers at the CBC that the Toronto Star was looking into allegations by an ex-girlfriend that he had engaged in non-consensual rough sex and that he denied this accusation. The crisis management firm Navigator Ltd. was hired to work for both Ghomeshi and the CBC.

In early summer of 2014, reporter Jesse Brown contacted the CBC and warned that Ghomeshi's behaviour may have crossed into his work environment. The corporation investigated and concluded that there were no workplace complaints against Ghomeshi. According to an investigation by CBC Television's The Fifth Estate, "almost all known staffers on ... Q said they were not contacted by CBC management as part of any investigation". Ghomeshi denied the accusations again and the Star declined to go forward with the story at that time.

In October 2014, Brown tweeted that he was working on a story that would be "worse than embarrassing for certain parties". He later said that he was referring to an unrelated story, but Ghomeshi requested a meeting with CBC management on October 23. During that meeting, the CBC viewed what it later described as "graphic evidence that Jian had caused physical injury to a woman". According to Vice, Ghomeshi showed his bosses lewd text messages on a CBC-owned phone and graphic personal sex videos.

On October 24, Ghomeshi announced he was taking an indefinite leave of absence from the CBC to deal with personal matters. Two days later, the CBC terminated his employment, with a spokesperson saying "information came to our attention recently that in CBC's judgment precludes us from continuing our relationship with Jian". Ghomeshi subsequently released a "lengthy Facebook post" saying his dismissal was motivated by fear of an alleged smear campaign by an ex-girlfriend that according to Ghomeshi could release private details about his sex life. Ghomeshi also said he refused an offer by the CBC to "walk away quietly". Chris Boyce, the head of CBC Radio, denied that such an offer was made.

Ghomeshi filed a $55 million lawsuit against the CBC, alleging that the corporation misused "personal and confidential information provided to it in confidence". He also filed "a union grievance alleging wrongful dismissal and defamation", and stated through his lawyer that he "does not engage in non-consensual role play or sex and any suggestion of the contrary is defamatory". Ghomeshi withdrew his lawsuit on November 25, 2014. The terms of settlement stipulated that Ghomeshi pay the CBC $18,000 in legal costs.

=== Literature ===
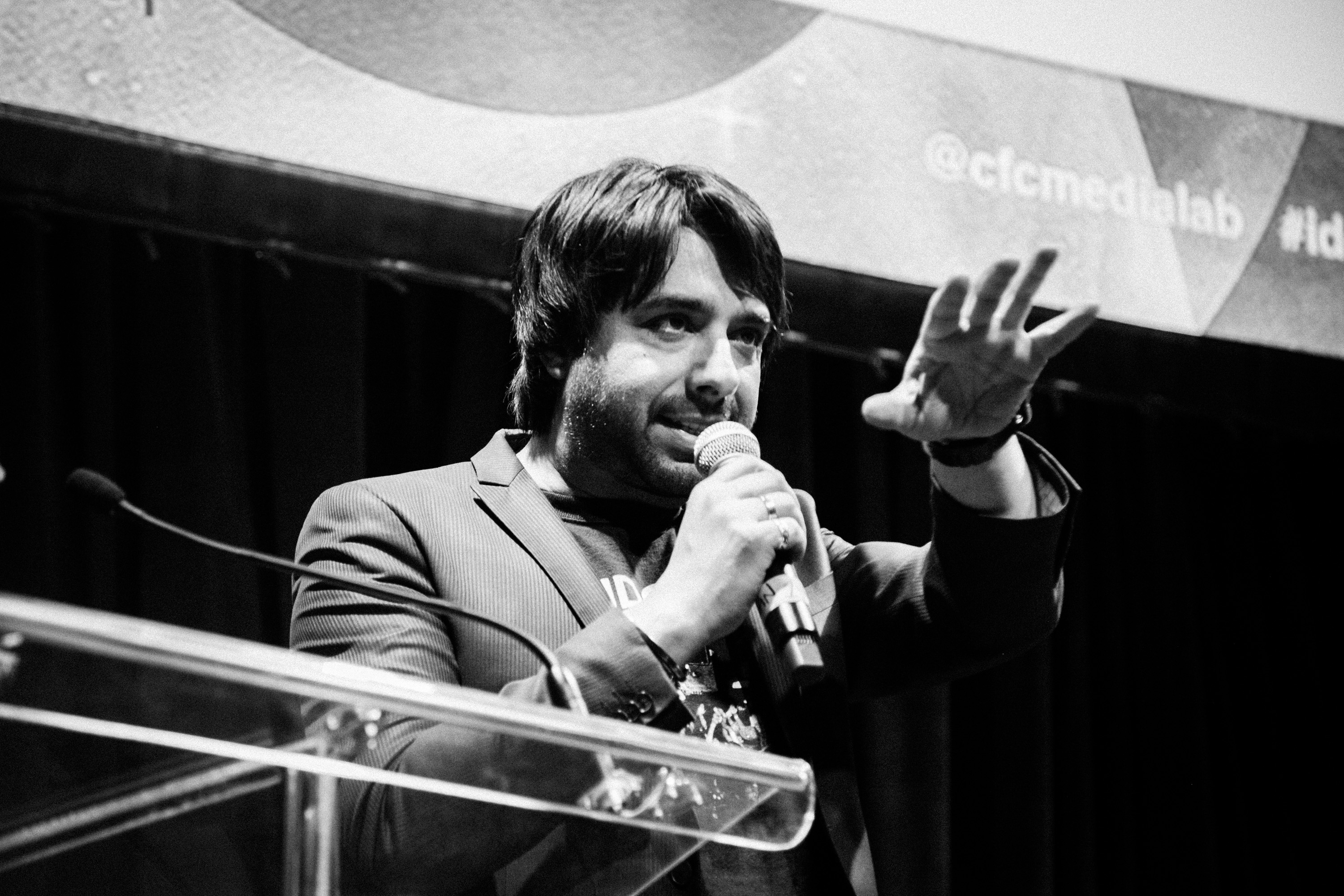
Ghomeshi hosting a Canadian Film Centre event on May 8, 2014.

Ghomeshi's literary debut, 1982, is a creative non-fiction title, about that year of his youth. It was released on September 18, 2012. It is a memoir of Ghomeshi's life at the age of 14 (during 1982) growing up as a Persian-Canadian in Thornhill, his attempt to fit in as one of the few non-white kids in his neighbourhood, and his goal of mimicking his idol David Bowie.

1982 received a mixed reception from critics. Canadian poet, novelist and TV writer Zoe Whittall called it a "funny, nostalgic and compelling read, especially for music nerds of a certain age." Stephen Carlick criticized the book, saying that Ghomeshi's attempt to appeal to the varied audience that listened to Q made it "uneven and often tedious" to read, making the reader question who the book was for after the prologue, which Carlick referred to as "1982 for Dummies". Carlick also noted that "Ghomeshi is a nice guy ... inoffensive and genial", but the book, by "trying to appeal to everyone", is spread "too thin".

In October 2014 his publisher, Penguin Random House Canada, announced that it would not publish his second book "in light of recent events" following allegations of sexual abuse.

In September 2018, The New York Review of Books published "Reflections from a Hashtag", a 3,000-word essay by Ghomeshi. The essay drew a "storm of criticism" from major figures in the literary world, an apology from the magazine, and the late-September firing of editor Ian Buruma. On October 25, the magazine's editors acknowledged that the essay generated "considerable criticism from readers" and admitted to "failures in the presentation and editing of his story". The editors wrote that readers should have been informed about the "serious nature and number of allegations against Mr. Ghomeshi" and they added a summary of these allegations to the online version of the essay.

In response to Ghomeshi's essay, Jesse Brown wrote on Canadaland: "The piece is filled with inaccuracies, omissions, evasions, and mischaracterizations about what he [Ghomeshi] did, what he is alleged to have done, and what happened to him as a result—much of which are matters of public record." Brown added that while "The New York Review of Books presented Ghomeshi's essay under the grave cover headline 'THE FALL OF MEN'", the "fall of Jian Ghomeshi is not indicative of the fall of men, mankind, masculinity, or anything so dire. It was the fall of one man who, by his own admission, was hurting people and abusing his power".

=== Podcasting ===
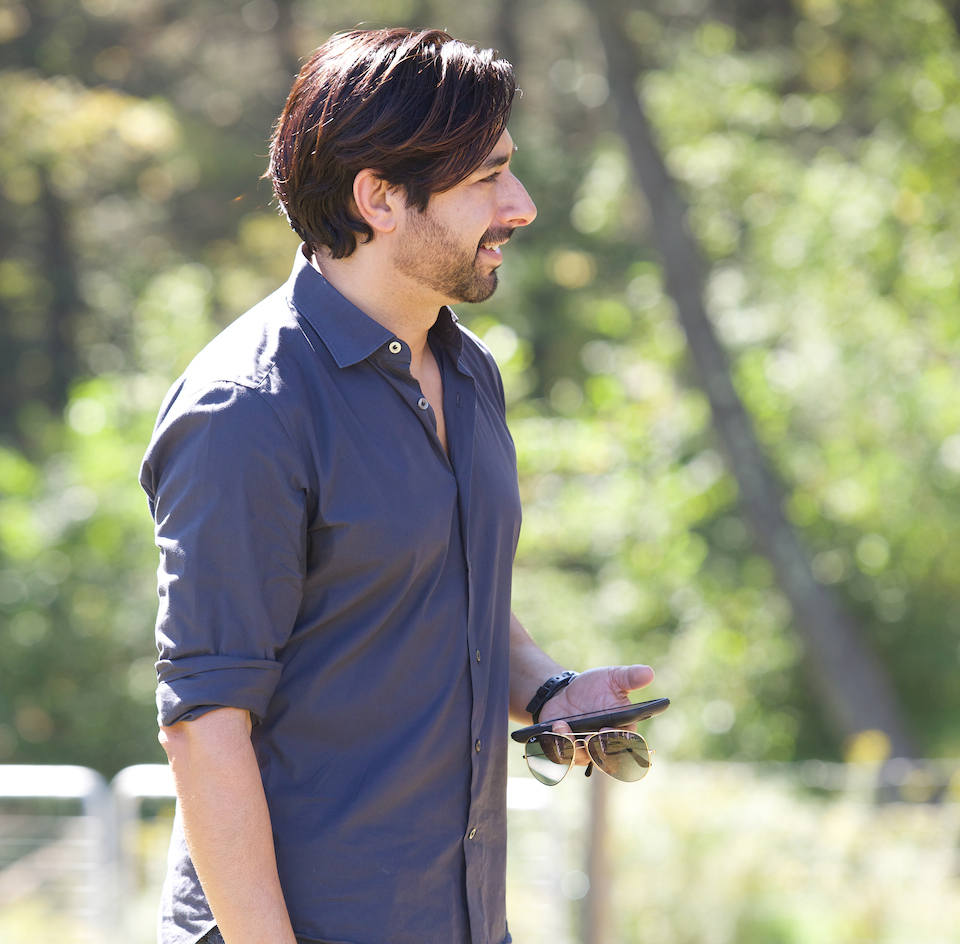
Ghomeshi at the Harvest Celebration in September 2017.

In April 2017, Ghomeshi launched The Ideation Project, a music and podcast series featuring all-original words, music, recordings and production by Ghomeshi commenting on cultural and newsworthy topics. Ghomeshi launched The Ideation Project with a monologue called "Exiles" on the topic of what it means to not have a homeland. The podcast was discontinued after one season.

Since 2020, Ghomeshi has been the executive producer and host of Roqe, an English-language podcast aimed at the Iranian diaspora.

== Criminal charges and trial ==
On November 26, 2014, following his termination by the CBC, Ghomeshi turned himself in to the Toronto Police Service and was charged with four counts of sexual assault and one count of overcoming resistance by choking, after an investigation that began on October 31, 2014. The charges concerned three separate women. He appeared in court on the same day and was released on $100,000 bail on the conditions that he surrender his passport, stay within Ontario and live with his mother.

Ghomeshi appeared in court again on January 8, 2015, and was charged with three additional counts of sexual assault related to three more women. In a court appearance on February 26, 2015, a judicial pretrial was set for March 27, 2015, and was later put over to April 28, 2015. His lawyer, Marie Henein, stated that he would plead not guilty to all charges. On October 1, 2015, Ghomeshi pleaded not guilty to one count of choking and four counts of sexual assault.

Ghomeshi's trial began on February 1, 2016, and lasted eight days. Henein was able to access thousands of messages between Ghomeshi's accusers and presented them during the trial. Judge William Horkins stated that the complainants had provided what he described as "deceptive and manipulative" evidence, claiming the "inconsistency" and "outright deception" of the witnesses' testimony had irreparably weakened the prosecution's case. On March 24, 2016, the judge acquitted Ghomeshi of all charges on the basis that there was insufficient evidence to establish proof beyond a reasonable doubt.

These statements, as well as the verdict of the trial itself, caused a great deal of controversy online, with many feeling like the plaintiffs had been treated unfairly and subjected to a biased trial, while others felt that the evidence was not strong enough to convict. The trial also raised legal questions as to whether victims were properly protected in Canadian law. This resulted in Bill C-51, which, among other things, increased the number of legal protections extended to sexual assault victims. It included the so-called "Ghomeshi rules" which required the defense to submit private records to the judge before being allowed to introduce them as evidence, making the defense used by Henein no longer legal. Many lawyers objected to this change, arguing that it would be unconstitutional and unfairly beneficial to plaintiffs.

A second trial for one additional charge was scheduled for June 2016. On May 11, 2016, however, the Crown withdrew the last remaining charge over the alleged sexual assault against Kathryn Borel, a producer of Q, after Ghomeshi signed a peace bond. The publication ban as to the name of the victim, Borel, was lifted that same day. According to Borel, Henein approached Borel's representation to ask for an alternative to a trial, and after several exchanges Ghomeshi agreed to apologize to Borel and did so formally. "A peace bond is an order from a court that typically involves keeping good behaviour and a prohibition on contacting the complainant," lawyers told the CBC. "The signing of a peace bond is not an admission of having committed a crime."

=== Further allegations ===
In 2022, actress Sarah Polley accused Ghomeshi of sexually assaulting her on a date in 1995, when she was 16 and he was 28. Polley made the accusation in her autobiographical essay collection Run Towards the Danger, in which she wrote that she had wanted to come forward about her experiences in 2014 but was dissuaded by family and friends from speaking out.

== Awards ==
- Favourite New Group (Moxy Früvous), CASBY Awards (1993)
- Best Media Personality, NOW Magazine (2009)
- Gold Award for Best Talk Show Interview, New York Festivals International Radio Awards (2010)
- Gold Award for Best Talk Show Host, New York Festivals International Radio Awards (2012)
