= Thornlea Secondary School =

Location
- 8075 Bayview Avenue; Markham, Ontario, L3T 4N4; 43°49′46″N 79°24′11″W

Information
- School type: Public school
- Motto: Think and be thought of
- Religious affiliation: Secular
- Founded: 1968
- School board: York Region District School Board
- Superintendent: Donna Donalds
- Area trustee: Jenny Chen
- School number: 947814
- Principal: Patrick Belmonte
- Grades: 9–12
- Enrolment: 1241 (October 2025)
- Language: English, French
- Area: Thornhill, Markham, Ontario
- Colours: Purple, White, and Black
- Mascot: Pharley J Cumquat
- Newspaper: Thornlea Deadline
- Community: CEC West
- Bell times: 8:45 AM – 3:05 PM
- Telephone: 905-889-9696; 647-795-7692
- Website: thornlea.ss.yrdsb.ca
- Last updated: May 2026

Thornlea Secondary School is a public high school in the Regional Municipality of York, opened in 1968 and located in Markham, Ontario, Canada, in the Thornhill neighbourhood, on the northeast corner of Bayview Avenue and Willowbrook Road, just south of Highway 407.

The school began in 1968 as an educational experiment. The curriculum was varied and specialized, following a trimester system, and students were encouraged to address their teachers by their first names and focus on independent learning. Around 1980, this model gave way to a more traditional academic environment.

== Academic life ==
Alongside traditional disciplinary staples such as English, mathematics, science (chemistry, physics, and biology), physical education, and social science (divided evenly between history and geography), Thornlea also offers courses in the fine arts, music (vocal, choral, orchestral, wind ensemble, and jazz), drama, introduction to business studies (general, marketing, and accounting), and design and technology (automotive maintenance, communications, media and film studies, woodworking, engineering, and cosmetology). A survey course in philosophy, generally popular among Thornlea seniors, has also been offered inconsistently over the years depending on the availability of a qualified instructor. A variety of creative writing courses have also been offered over the years, the existence of which has typically depended on instructor interest and availability.

The school offers special education courses and classes — some integrated, some self-contained — including programs for students with autism, those in alternative education, and those with acquired brain injury.

== Criticisms ==
The physical structure of the building has been the target of many complaints, notably due to its poor internal ventilation and lack of exterior windows (there are windows inside the school). This architectural peculiarity stems from the fact that Thornlea was originally designed as a prototype for an educational model where external stimuli — such as vegetation, the sky, and wildlife — are minimized, while internal stimuli — such as bookshelves, other students, and computer terminals — are maximized. The idea was that students would be less distracted and more psychologically conditioned to focus on their studies. However, some classrooms and staff rooms are located in the middle of the school surrounded by walls, leading to overheating and poor ventilation in summer. The experiment was eventually abandoned, and a new southern wing with windows for every externally facing classroom was built during the 2000–01 school year.

In the 2012–2013 school year, the school gained local media attention when it was discovered that the principal planned to paint over the murals adorning the empty spaces above the lockers.

== Specialized programs ==
Thornlea Secondary School hosts four main specialized programs: ACAM, AP, French Immersion, and SHSM.

=== ACAM ===
The ACAM program (Academy of Creativity and Multimedia) provides students wishing to pursue a career in the arts with a specialized curriculum. The program teaches a wide range of art skills and technologies, including Photoshop, Flash, Adobe Illustrator, Google SketchUp, Google Terrain, Blender, Dreamweaver, Reaper, and visual arts.

=== AP Program ===
The AP (Advanced Placement) program aims to enrich the classroom environment and challenge students to use higher-order thinking skills. Courses available under the AP program include Art, Advanced Functions, Calculus, Biology, Chemistry, Physics, English, and French.

=== French Immersion ===
The French Immersion program at Thornlea allows students to develop their French language skills across a variety of courses. Students are required to take grade 9 geography, grade 9 physical education, grade 10 history, and grade 10 civics and careers in French. They are also required to take one French course each year, and must choose two additional courses in French from art, business, SAP (Anthropology, Psychology, and Sociology), or Co-Op.

=== SHSM ===
The SHSM (Specialist High Skills Majors) program enables students to develop relevant skills for various industries. Students are given 7–9 courses, including a co-op credit, within their chosen sector. The three sectors available are Arts and Culture, Business, and Health and Wellness.

== Clubs ==
Thornlea Secondary School hosts a total of 57 clubs (not including sports teams). Thornlea students often assist in the social activist life of Thornhill, and have in the past helped organize the Terry Fox Run and the Walk Against Male Violence.

=== Amnesty Club ===
Thornlea's Amnesty Club has engaged with a number of social justice issues, including Women's Rights in Iran, Black Lives Matter, and Indigenous Rights.

=== TWIC ===
The Thornlea Wellness Initiative Council (TWIC) is a club whose goal is to promote student wellbeing and mental health through events and wellness activities. Events hosted by TWIC include an annual wellness fair, a therapy dog event, a soccer tournament, and a chess tournament.

=== Thornlea Deadline ===
Thornlea Secondary School hosts a student newspaper that reports on events in and around the school. The first Thornlea newspaper, known as The Underground, was created in the 1980s as an unofficial, secretive publication that acted as a hub for student journalism. It was eventually discovered by school administration and shut down. A decade later, in the late 1990s, an official newspaper titled Deadline was established, running for several editions before folding after its editor-in-chief graduated. A separate publication, Thornlea RAW, also released several editions in the mid-1990s.

In the 2001–2002 school year, the Thornlea Music Council launched a newspaper titled Volume, which also ceased publication after a year when its entire editorial team graduated. In 2005, another newspaper titled Ka-Boom! was started, but it too was eventually discontinued. In 2021, two students created a new publication called Thunder News, which served as a newsletter for Thornlea students. After its editor-in-chief graduated, it was handed to two new executives who rebranded it as TN Mag (Thornlea Magazine), which ran during the 2022–2023 school year but released only one edition. In the 2023–2024 school year, TN Magazine was passed to a new editor-in-chief who, alongside two executives, rebranded it back to Deadline.

=== Thornlea Tech ===
Thornlea Tech (formerly known as Thornlea Lights, Set and Sound) is a club responsible for the technical production of various assemblies and events throughout the year, including drama productions and the TWIC Wellness Fair. The team operates soundboards, lightboards, cameras, speakers, wiring, and various other equipment to ensure events run smoothly.

Thornlea Tech also hosts an annual haunted house, constructing a maze that students attempt to navigate. In the 2023–2024 school year, Thornlea Tech collaborated with the Thornlea Multimedia Club for the event.

=== Thornlea Multimedia Club ===
The Thornlea Multimedia Club (MMC) is a student club focused on creating films and movies. The club comprises several departments: production, acting, editing, art, writing, and audio. Notable films include Who's Our Culprit, Bad Faith, and Skadoosh. In 2022, the club won the Vaughan Film Festival EIPMA Student Film Award.

=== Thornlea Robotics ===
Thornlea Secondary School hosts a robotics team known as Thunder Robotics (Team 8764), sponsored by the York Region District School Board, Thornlea Secondary School, the Argosy Foundation, Sylvan Learning, and EMX. The team began their rookie year in 2022, competing as part of the FIRST Robotics Competition.

Thunder Robotics has participated in the District of Waterloo Event, District McMaster University Event, and the FIRST Ontario Provincial Championship (Science Division). The team is currently ranked 53rd out of 198 teams in Ontario, with a total score of 97 points across 41 matches, winning 16 and losing 20.

== Athletics ==
Thornlea Secondary School hosts a wide variety of athletic teams, including soccer, tennis, rugby, basketball, cross country, volleyball, golf, swimming, rock climbing, curling, skiing, snowboarding, badminton, track and field, ultimate frisbee, flag football, and baseball.

== Notable alumni ==
=== Music ===
- Dylan Sinclair – musician
- Gavin Brown – record producer
- Hayden – singer-songwriter
- Jason Levine – The Philosopher Kings, Prozzak
- Mike Ford – Moxy Früvous, The Cocksure Lads
- Murray Foster – Moxy Früvous, Great Big Sea, The Cocksure Lads
- Noah Mintz – hHead, Noah's Arkweld, producer and engineer

=== Film and television ===
- Adam Korson – actor
- Bill Welychka – former VJ, MuchMusic
- Cameron Mathison – actor, All My Children
- Daniel Magder – actor, Life With Derek
- Ernie Grunwald – actor
- Jian Ghomeshi – media personality, ex-host of CBC's Q
- Kai Soremekun – director/actor, Heat
- Lauren Collins – actress, Degrassi: The Next Generation
- Sheila McCarthy – actor
- Stu Stone – actor/musician, Donnie Darko, My Pet Monster, Blowin' Up

=== Sports ===
- Rob Rusnov – Canadian archer who competed in the Pan American Games
- Leonard Miller – Canadian basketball player
- Kassius Robertson – basketball player

=== Politics ===
- Jim Watson (Canadian politician) – mayor of Ottawa (2010 to 2022)

=== Other ===
- Parham Aarabi – professor (University of Toronto), entrepreneur
- Gordon Korman – youth novel writer
- Alicia Ross – victim of Daniel Sylvester
- Mark Scheinberg – co-founder and former CEO of PokerStars

=== Criminals ===
- Alek Minassian – mass murderer (2018 Toronto van attack)
- Daniel Sylvester – murderer

== See also ==
- Education in Ontario
- List of secondary schools in Ontario
