= Trial of Jian Ghomeshi =

2016 Canadian criminal trial

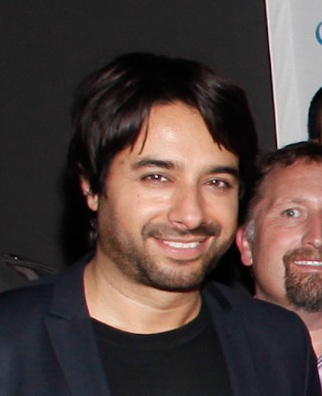
Jian Ghomeshi in 2014

In late 2014, Canadian radio host Jian Ghomeshi was arrested and charged with four counts of sexual assault, and one count of overcoming resistance by choking, in relation to three complainants. He was charged with three additional counts related to three more women on January 8, 2015. On October 1, 2015, Ghomeshi pleaded not guilty to one count of choking and four counts of sexual assault. The trial began on February 1, 2016. He was acquitted of all five charges on March 24, 2016.

== Background ==
=== Early allegations ===
Ghomeshi was the host and co-creator of the CBC Radio One show Q. He hosted the show from 2007 to 2014, until fired by the CBC. In 2010, the producer of Q, Kathryn Borel, approached her union, the Canadian Media Guild, reporting that Ghomeshi had repeatedly sexually harassed her starting in 2007. She also reported that there was "...emotional abuse, too: gaslighting and psychological games that undermined [her] intelligence, security and sense of self. Sometimes that hit harder than the physical trespassing." Borel declined to start a union arbitration or formal grievance but met with the executive producer of the show informally. Borel says that her union representative and the producer "did nothing." When Borel's allegations became public in 2014, CMG national president Carmel Smyth described Borel's experience as unacceptable and stated that sexual harassment is now a priority for the union.

In 2012, journalism students at the University of Western Ontario were advised not to pursue internships at Q due to Ghomeshi's rumoured inappropriate behaviour toward young women.

In 2013, journalist Carla Ciccone published an account of her date with a Canadian radio host to XoJane titled "I Accidentally Went on a Date With a Presumed-Gay Canadian C-List Celebrity Who Creepily Proved He Isn't Gay." Ciccone refers to the personality under a pseudonym but Toronto Life identified the individual as Ghomeshi. The article claims the radio host as making unwanted physical advances. Ghomeshi did not deny going on a date with Ciccone and claimed not to have read the article, but stated that much of it was untrue from what he had heard.

In 2014, a Twitter account named for Ghomeshi's teddy bear, Big Ears Teddy, made accusations of abuse against him; these accusations included an April 9, 2014, tweet signed "every female Carleton U media grad."

=== Dismissal from the CBC ===
In the spring of 2014, Ghomeshi advised his employers at the CBC that the Toronto Star was looking into allegations by an ex-girlfriend that he had engaged in non-consensual rough sex and that he denied this accusation. The crisis management firm Navigator was hired to work for both Ghomeshi and the CBC.

In early summer of 2014, reporter Jesse Brown contacted the CBC and warned that Ghomeshi's behaviour might have crossed into his work environment. The CBC investigated and concluded that there were no workplace complaints against Ghomeshi. According to an investigation by the CBC's The Fifth Estate, "almost all known staffers on... Q said they were not contacted by CBC management as part of any investigation." Ghomeshi denied the accusations again and the Toronto Star declined to go forward with the story at that time.

In October 2014, Brown tweeted that he was working on a story that would be "worse than embarrassing for certain parties". Brown later said that he was referring to another story but Ghomeshi requested a meeting with CBC on October 23. During that meeting, the CBC viewed what it later described as "graphic evidence that Jian had caused physical injury to a woman". According to Vice, Ghomeshi showed his bosses lewd text messages on a CBC-owned phone and graphic personal sex videos.

On October 24, Ghomeshi announced he was taking an indefinite leave of absence from the network to deal with personal matters. Two days later, the CBC terminated Ghomeshi's employment, with a CBC spokesperson saying "information came to our attention recently that in CBC's judgment precludes us from continuing our relationship with Jian." Ghomeshi subsequently released a "lengthy Facebook post" saying his dismissal was motivated by fear of an alleged smear campaign by an ex-girlfriend that according to Ghomeshi could release private details about his sexual life. Ghomeshi also said he refused an offer by the CBC to "walk away quietly." Chris Boyce, the head of CBC Radio, denied that such an offer was made.

Ghomeshi filed a $55 million lawsuit against the CBC, alleging that the broadcaster misused "personal and confidential information provided to it in confidence". He also filed "a union grievance alleging wrongful dismissal and defamation," and stated through his lawyer that he "does not engage in non-consensual role play or sex and any suggestion of the contrary is defamatory." Ghomeshi withdrew his lawsuit on November 25, 2014. The terms of settlement stipulated that Ghomeshi will pay the CBC $18,000 in legal costs.

Following his firing, the Toronto Star published allegations by three women who said that they experienced violence from Ghomeshi without consent, along with allegations by a former CBC colleague, who later revealed her identity as Kathryn Borel, who said that Ghomeshi had sexually harassed her in the workplace. A fifth woman gave an interview to CBC Radio's As It Happens on October 29, 2014, also revealing that Ghomeshi physically abused her on their first date. By December 16, 15 women and one man had approached media outlets with abuse allegations against Ghomeshi. Actress Lucy DeCoutere was the first woman to agree to the publication of her name in conjunction with the allegations, followed by author and lawyer Reva Seth. Jim Hounslow later came forward publicly accusing Ghomeshi of sexually assaulting him while the two were students at York University in the early 1990s.

On October 30, Ghomeshi was dropped by Navigator and the public relations firm, Rock-it Productions, ended their association with Ghomeshi.

Both Carleton University and the CBC launched private investigations into allegations against Ghomeshi. The CBC investigation was led by Janice Rubin, a prominent lawyer and leading authority on workplace harassment, and the results were released on April 16, 2015. The report stated that Ghomeshi "consistently breached the behavourial standard... of CBC by yelling at, belittling and humiliating others" and it referred to the "sexualized conduct and comments of Mr. Ghomeshi" in the workplace. The report stated that "[m]anagement knew or ought to have known of this behaviour and conduct and failed to take steps required of it in accordance with its own policies to ensure that the workplace was free from disrespectful and abusive conduct". The report stated that "[i]t is our conclusion that CBC management condoned this behaviour." Carleton University's review, however, found that none of their students were "affected" by Ghomeshi and that "no one has raised any concerns about their placements" with CBC.

As a result of his firing and the accusations made against him, Ghomeshi was named QMI Agency's newsmaker of the year. On January 5, 2015, the CBC placed Boyce and Todd Spencer, the executive director of human resources and industrial relations for English services, on indefinite leave of absence because of the Ghomeshi scandal. The CBC announced their dismissal on April 16, 2015. Spencer sued CBC in May 2016 for wrongful dismissal, saying that he was "scapegoated" by the corporation.

== Criminal proceedings ==
On November 26, 2014 Ghomeshi turned himself in to Toronto Police and was charged with four counts of sexual assault and one count of overcoming resistance by choking, after an investigation that began on October 31. The charges concern three separate women. He appeared in court on the same day and was released on $100,000 bail on the conditions that he surrender his passport, stay within Ontario and live with his mother.

Ghomeshi appeared in court again on January 8, 2015, and was charged with three additional counts of sexual assault related to three more women. In a court appearance on February 26, 2015, a judicial pretrial was set for March 27, 2015, and was later put over to April 28, 2015. His lawyer, Marie Henein, stated that he would plead not guilty to all charges.

On October 1, 2015, Ghomeshi pleaded not guilty to one count of choking and four counts of sexual assault.

=== Trial and acquittal ===
The trial of Ghomeshi began on February 1, 2016. On day one of the trial, the first complainant testified that Ghomeshi made a "sudden switch from charm to brutality", and that he punched her in the head and pulled her hair. The following day, Ghomeshi's defence lawyer, Marie Henein, "questioned the reliability of the complainant's memory and, at times, her honesty". Henein pointed out differing accounts of the complainant's story to police and during her testimony. The complainant, who had previously testified to having no contact with Ghomeshi after the alleged assaults, was confronted with two emails she had written to Ghomeshi more than a year afterwards, one included a picture of her in bikini; she described them as "bait" to get him to explain why he attacked her.

On day three, Lucy DeCoutere testified, telling the court of a date with Ghomeshi in July 2003. She alleged that "he slapped her without warning and choked her until she couldn't breathe". During cross-examination, Henein presented court with a series of emails written by DeCoutere in the hours following the alleged assault, including an email written hours after the alleged assault which read "You kicked my ass last night and that makes me want to fuck your brains out", a handwritten letter that said "I love your hands", and a photo of her "fellating" a beer bottle in October 2005. DeCoutere said that she was trying to please and placate Ghomeshi because she blamed herself for the crimes and that none of that changed the fact that she was assaulted.

The third complainant, who could not be named because of a publication ban, testified that Ghomeshi put his hands and teeth on her neck while they kissed on a park bench. Days before testifying, she said that after inadvertently hearing that emails from the previous complainants were read out in court, she told police about a date she had with Ghomeshi after the alleged assault in which she had a consensual sexual encounter with him that she did not disclose earlier. Under cross examination, Henein accused the complainant of lying to police in her initial statement, while the complainant called it "an omission". Henein also questioned her about her friendship with DeCoutere, including exchanging 5,000 text messages and sharing a lawyer and a publicist.

The Crown asked the judge, Justice William Horkins, "...to allow a final witness to be deemed admissible, saying she would corroborate Ms. DeCoutere's version of events" on day six. The defense opposed calling the witness, but Horkins ruled that the new witness could testify. Due to a snowstorm, the witness, actress Sarah E. Dunsworth, did not testify and instead a transcript of her statement to police and messages exchanged between her and DeCoutere were provided.

On the last day of the trial, the Crown and defence team made their closing arguments to the judge. Crown prosecutor Michael Callaghan stated that the "...credibility of Ghomeshi's three accusers has nothing to do with the way they behaved after the alleged incidents".

On March 24, 2016, the judge delivered the verdict. Ghomeshi was acquitted of all charges. Justice William Horkins stated that the inconsistency and "outright deception" of the witness' testimony had irreparably weakened the prosecution's case. "Each complainant," he wrote, "demonstrated, to some degree, a willingness to ignore their oath to tell the truth on more than one occasion." Referring to a witness' excuse that she was merely trying to "navigate" the proceeding, Horkins replied "'Navigating' this sort of proceeding is really quite simple: tell the truth, the whole truth and nothing but the truth."

=== Separate charge ===
One additional charge of sexual assault was expected to be addressed at a separate trial in June 2016. On May 11, 2016, however, the Crown withdrew the last remaining charge, involving the alleged sexual assault against former CBC co-worker, Kathryn Borel, after Ghomeshi signed a peace bond. A peace bond does not include an admission of guilt but is premised on the complainant having a reasonable fear that the person entering the peace bond will cause personal injury to the complainant or to their intimate partner, or damage the complainant's property, or post an intimate image without consent contrary to s.162.1 of the Criminal Code. Ghomeshi also agreed to apologize to Borel and did so formally. "No workplace friendship or creative environment excuses this sort of behaviour, especially when there's a power imbalance as there was with Ms. Borel," Ghomeshi stated.

Later that day, Borel issued a formal statement to the media, insisting that Ghomeshi was guilty of sexual assault. "There are at least three documented incidents of physical touching," she said. "A trial would have maintained his lie, the lie that he was not guilty, and would have further subjected me to the very same pattern of abuse that I am currently trying to stop," Borel added. Borel was critical of the CBC for its handling of her initial complaint about Ghomeshi's behaviour. The CBC apologized to Borel publicly, on May 11, the second such apology by the Corporation, in a statement by head of public affairs Chuck Thompson.

== Reactions and analysis ==
=== 2016 ===
Immediately after the verdict, supporters of the women expressed their disdain for the judge's ruling. They argued he was blaming the victims for not conforming to stereotypes of how women should behave, and that this could dissuade other women from coming forward in the future. Tom Mulcair, then head of the NDP party, tweeted that he believed the alleged survivors and criticized the Canadian legal system. Other Canadian celebrities and activists voiced similar opinions. Andrew Burke, an associate professor of cultural studies at the University of Winnipeg, wrote "That was a total masterclass in misogynist, arrogant windbaggery just now from Judge Horkins." Outside the courtroom, dozens of protesters voiced their support for the women, shouting "Ghomeshi guilty". Ghomeshi's sister also read a short statement expressing relief about the verdict and criticizing the lack of "due process" up to this point.

Toronto lawyer Jonathan Rosenthal, however, stated: "It's a very bad case for the victims' rights movement to be jumping up and screaming about. It's atypical: This is a case where, bottom line, the complainants all lied." The case was also atypical in that the police solicited victims to come forward, and that some were very active with media interviews (DeCoutere conducted 19 herself) which were used against them in cross examination. The complainants were also in an environment with supporters saying victims must be believed. This perceived solidarity led to two of the complainants exchanging more than 5,000 messages before the trial. The potential for this to be seen as collusion led to the Crown abandoning an application to make "similar fact" case which tied the three complaints together.

After the verdict, Marie Henein, Ghomeshi's lead attorney, responded to criticisms of her and the legal process in a televised interview. In response to those who called her actions a betrayal of women, she said, "I respect their right to say that, I don't respect their opinion or agree with it" and "I'm not about to send myself back into the kitchen because somebody doesn't like what I do." Henein spoke highly of the Canadian Courts, arguing that people get justice but that should not be confused with getting what they want. Referring to criticism that she undermined the complainants, she pointed out that no one should be believed without question including the police, "It's never been to the benefit of the disadvantaged or the most marginalized." She had specific criticism of Tom Mulcair's comments: "When you are denigrating the legal system in which he worked ... not having read a word of transcript, and not having informed yourself of the case, that's disappointing and not something I would put much stock in."

=== 2017 onwards 2022 ===
In 2018, the federal government of Canada passed rape shield legislation limiting the extent to which past behaviour could be used against witnesses at sexual assault trials. The changes were the result of recommendations from a 2012 report from Senate of Canada, although they were not implemented until after Ghomeshi's trial. Following appeals about the new rules lodged in two court cases in Ontario and British Columbia, the Supreme Court of Canada held in 2022 that the rules were fair. The legal changes were described in the Globe and Mail newspaper as the Ghomeshi amendments.
