= Play (TV series) =

- Genre: News, pop culture, entertainment
- Starring: Jian Ghomeshi
- Country of origin: Canada
- Original language: English

Original release
- Network: CBC Newsworld
- Release: 2002 – 2005

Play (stylized as >play) is a Canadian news magazine series, focusing on pop culture and entertainment, which aired on CBC Newsworld between 2002 and 2005. The show was hosted by Jian Ghomeshi, a former member of pop group Moxy Früvous. The show initially aired weekly. Then themed episodes aired once every several weeks. However, the show was cancelled due to poor ratings.
