= Marie Henein =

Canadian criminal defence lawyer (born 1966)

Marie Henein KC
- Born: 1966 (age 59–60); Cairo, Egypt
- Education: Osgoode Hall Law School (LLB); Columbia Law School (LLM)
- Occupations: Civil litigator and criminal lawyer
- Years active: 1992–present
- Spouse: Glen Jennings

Marie Therese Henein KC (born 1966) is a Canadian civil litigator and criminal defence lawyer. She is a partner of Henein Hutchison Robitaille LLP, a law firm in Toronto.

== Early life ==
Henein was born in Cairo, Egypt, to Lebanese Maronite Christian parents. Her father, Joseph Henein, worked at a pharmacy. After briefly moving to Vancouver, then less than a year later to Lebanon, the family finally settled in Toronto when Marie was four years old. She attended St. Joseph's Morrow Park Catholic Secondary School.

== Education ==
Henein attended Osgoode Hall Law School, where she graduated with a Bachelor of Laws (LLB) degree. After graduating, Henein articled under noted criminal defence lawyer Edward Greenspan. She then attended Columbia Law School, and received her Master of Laws (LLM) degree in 1991. Henein was called to the bar in 1992.

== Legal career ==
She was later rehired at Edward Greenspan's firm after working with his partner, Marc Rosenberg. She eventually was named a partner of the firm in 1998. In 2002, Henein left to open Henein and Associates. The firm later was renamed as Henein Hutchison LLP after former crown attorney Scott Hutchison joined the firm as a named partner, and then again to Henein Hutchison Robitaille when Henein's long-time colleague Danielle Robitaille was promoted to managing partner.

Henein developed a reputation in Toronto as one of the most "respected and feared criminal lawyers in the country." The National Post called her the "most high profile criminal defence lawyer in the country." In 2011, Canadian Lawyer magazine named her one of the "Top 25 Most Influential" saying she was "one of the most sought-after criminal lawyers in the country" and "a key go-to lawyer for high-profile accused in Toronto."

Starting in the early to late 2010s, Henein began expanding her law firm to include a large civil litigation group, hiring prominent partners from Bay Street firms such as Torys and Borden Ladner Gervais. As her firm's focus shifted to include both criminal defence work and civil litigation, Henein herself began to take on more corporate law, professional regulation, and civil litigation cases as part of her legal practice. By March 2025, she estimated that 5% or less of her files were criminal defence matters.

== Notable cases ==
In 1998, with Greenspan, Henein defended former Nova Scotia premier Gerald Regan on sexual-misconduct charges. The Supreme Court of Canada denied Regan's appeal, but he was ultimately acquitted of all charges.

In her first case at her own firm, Henein defended Daniel Weiz, who was one of the young men charged in the 1999 death by beating of Toronto teen Dmitri Baranovski. Weiz was acquitted of all charges.

In 2008, Henein defended hockey agent David Frost, who was acquitted of the charges of sexual exploitation.

Henein represented Marvin Sazant, a Toronto doctor accused of tying up several young boys and repeatedly forcing sex on them. In 2009, the College of Physicians and Surgeons of Ontario revoked Sazant's licence "concluding that in three of the four cases, the allegations had been proved".

In 2009, Henein represented Bradley Harrison at the Supreme Court of Canada. The charges of possession of 35 kilograms of cocaine (worth about $4 million) were dropped.

Henein represented former Ontario attorney general Michael Bryant after he was charged with criminal negligence causing death and dangerous driving causing death for dragging a man with his car causing his death after a collision when the cyclist he struck became enraged. On May 25, 2010, all charges against Bryant were withdrawn.

In 2011, Henein's client John Magno received a twelve-year sentence in connection with an arson resulting in a death and one of the largest fires in Toronto's history "forcing the evacuation of 50 nearby homes on Danforth Avenue and requiring the services of more than 170 firefighters."

In November 2014, former CBC radio host Jian Ghomeshi hired Henein to defend him. He was charged in four cases of sexual assault and one case of choking a woman. The first trial of Ghomeshi began on February 1, 2016. The trial lasted eight days. On 24 March 2016, the judge delivered the verdict. Ghomeshi was acquitted of all charges, on the basis that there was insufficient evidence to establish proof beyond a reasonable doubt.

Henein represented Mark Norman during his trial for Breach of Trust, a charge that was eventually stayed on May 9, 2019.

In 2023, Henein represented Indigenous author Dawn Walker who was accused of parental abduction, forgery, and mischief. On November 2, 2023, Walker pleaded guilty to three of the charges against her. She was sentenced to a one-year conditional sentence in the community and 18 months’ probation. She also cannot have unsupervised visits with her son.

== Personal life ==
Her brother Peter Henein, previously a lawyer with the law firm Waddell Phillips Professional Corporation, is now a partner at HHR LLP. She is married to Glen Jennings, a lawyer specializing in White Collar cases who is also a partner at HHR LLP. They have two sons.
