= Bargainville =

Studio album by Moxy Früvous
- Released: July 19, 1993 (Canada); February 7, 1994 (United States)
- Recorded: 1993, Hurley, New York
- Length: 52:07
- Labels: Warner Music Canada, Atlantic
- Producer: Moxy Früvous

Moxy Früvous chronology
Moxy Früvous (The Indie Tape) (1992)	Bargainville (1993)	Wood (1995)

Bargainville is a 1993 album by Canadian band Moxy Früvous, their first major-label release. This disc's subject matter is divided between comedy and serious personal, social, and ecological issues.

Bargainville was released on July 19, 1993, in Canada by Warner Music Canada and on February 8, 1994, in the US by WEA/Atlantic Records. "Stuck in the 90's", "My Baby Loves a Bunch of Authors" and "Fell in Love" were released as singles.

== Commercial performance ==
Bargainville was successful in Canada, debuting at No. 6 on the The Record's Canadian Albums Chart. The album sold more than 50,000 copies within two weeks. The album's lead single, "Stuck in the 90's", peaked at No. 13 on Canada's singles chart. The album was certified Platinum in Canada in 1994.

== Critical reception ==
Professional ratings
Review scores
Source	Rating
AllMusic	3/5 stars
Calgary Herald	B

The Toronto Star noted that at times "vocals blend into pop perfection, conjuring up sonic images of the Beach Boys doing the soundtrack for a 1960s European road flick." The Calgary Herald praised "the clever way they mix folkish rhythms and mellow acoustics with their sentimental lyrics."

== Track listing ==
1. "River Valley" – 3:24
2. "Stuck in the 90's" – 4:26
3. "B.J. Don't Cry" – 3:19
4. "Video Bargainville" – 4:15
5. "Fell in Love" – 4:24
6. "The Lazy Boy" – 3:14
7. "My Baby Loves a Bunch of Authors" – 2:33
8. "The Drinking Song" – 5:07
9. "Morphée" – 2:13
10. "King of Spain" – 2:58
11. "Darlington Darling" – 3:36
12. "Bittersweet" – 3:25
13. "Laika" – 2:53
14. "Spiderman" – 1:44
15. "Gulf War Song" – 4:02

== Personnel ==
Moxy Früvous

- Jian Ghomeshi – lead vocals (2, 4, 6), backing vocals (1, 3, 5, 7–15), snare drum (1, 3–4, 7), tambourine (2, 5–6, 12), sheet metal (7, 10, 12), drums (6, 11), bass drum (2, 10), chicken shakers (6), bomb (8), shakers (10), go-go bells (10), conga (13), wooden door percussion (13)
- Murray Foster – lead vocals (12), backing vocals (1–4, 6–8, 10–11, 13–15), bass guitar (2–5, 7, 11, 13), guitar (9, 12), electric guitar (1), anvil (2), spring muffler (7)
- Mike Ford – lead vocals (3, 8–9, 11, 13–14), backing vocals (1–2, 4–7, 10, 12, 15), woodblock (1), harmonica (2), guitar (3, 11, 13), güira (Note: The instrument is called "guirra" in the liner notes.) (3), electric guitar (4), kabasa (4), money (4), flexatone (Note: The instrument is called "flexitone" in the liner notes.) (4), conga (6, 10), bass drum (12)
- Dave Matheson – lead vocals (1, 5, 7, 10, 15), backing vocals (2–4, 6, 8–9, 11–14), guitar (1–2, 5, 7–9), accordion (2–4, 8, 11), bass guitar (12), electric guitar (13), scream (4)

Additional personnel

- Doug McClement – "disfunctional youth" (4)

Production

- Moxy Früvous – Production
- Doug McClement – Associate producer and engineer
- John Yates – Assistant Engineer
- Andrew St. George – Assistant Engineer
- Mike Stanutz – Assistant Engineer
- Gabe Lee – Assistant Engineer
- Scott Keenan – Assistant Engineer
- Bob Ludwig – Mastering
