= Alexander brothers =

Alexander brothers may refer to:

- Alexander Brothers (American musicians), American pop music duo
- The Alexander Brothers, Scottish folk music duo
- Alexander brothers (sex offenders), Israeli-American real estate agents, sex traffickers, and convicted rapists
- Alexander Brothers (auto customizers)
