= Goodnight, Irene =

American folk song first recorded in 1933

- Sheet music for "Goodnight, Irene" by the Weavers

Song by Lead Belly
- B-side: "Ain't You Glad"
- Released: 1933
- Genre: Folk
- Length: 2:25
- Label: Melodisc
- Songwriters: John Lomax; Lead Belly

"Goodnight, Irene" or "Irene, Goodnight" (Roud 11681) is a 20th-century American folk standard, written in 3/4 time, first recorded by American blues musician Huddie "Lead Belly" Ledbetter in 1933. A version recorded by The Weavers was a No. 1 hit in 1950. Pete Seeger of The Weavers has characterized it as Lead Belly's "theme song".

The lyrics tell of the singer's troubled past with his love, Irene, and express his sadness and frustration. Several verses refer explicitly to suicidal fantasies, in the line "If Irene turns her back on me / I'll take morphine and die" and more famously in the line "sometimes I take a great notion to jump in the river and drown", which was the inspiration for the title of the 1964 Ken Kesey novel Sometimes a Great Notion and a song of the same name from John Mellencamp's 1989 album, Big Daddy, itself strongly informed by traditional American folk music.

== Origin ==
In 1886, Gussie Lord Davis published a song called "Irene, Goodnight". The lyrics of the song have some similarities to "Goodnight, Irene" to suggest that Huddie Ledbetter's song was based on Davis' lyrics. There is also a degree of resemblance in the music despite some differences, such as their time signatures, to indicate that the two songs are related. According to Ledbetter, he first heard the core of the song, the refrain, and a couple of verses from his uncle Terrill. Another of his uncles, Bob Ledbetter, who also recorded a nearly identical version of the song, said that he also learned the song from Terrill. Family members of Huddie Ledbetter indicate that he may have sung the song as early as 1908 as a lullaby to his niece, Irene Campbell. Ledbetter eventually extended the song to six verses.

== Lead Belly's version ==
John Lomax recorded a version of Huddie Ledbetter's song "Irene" in 1933, on a prison visit to Angola (Louisiana State Penitentiary). These recordings for the Library of Congress included three takes of "Irene". The first version recorded in 1933 had two verses and two choruses, the second version from 1934 had four verses and four refrains, while the third version from 1936 had six verses and six refrains, including an extended spoken part.

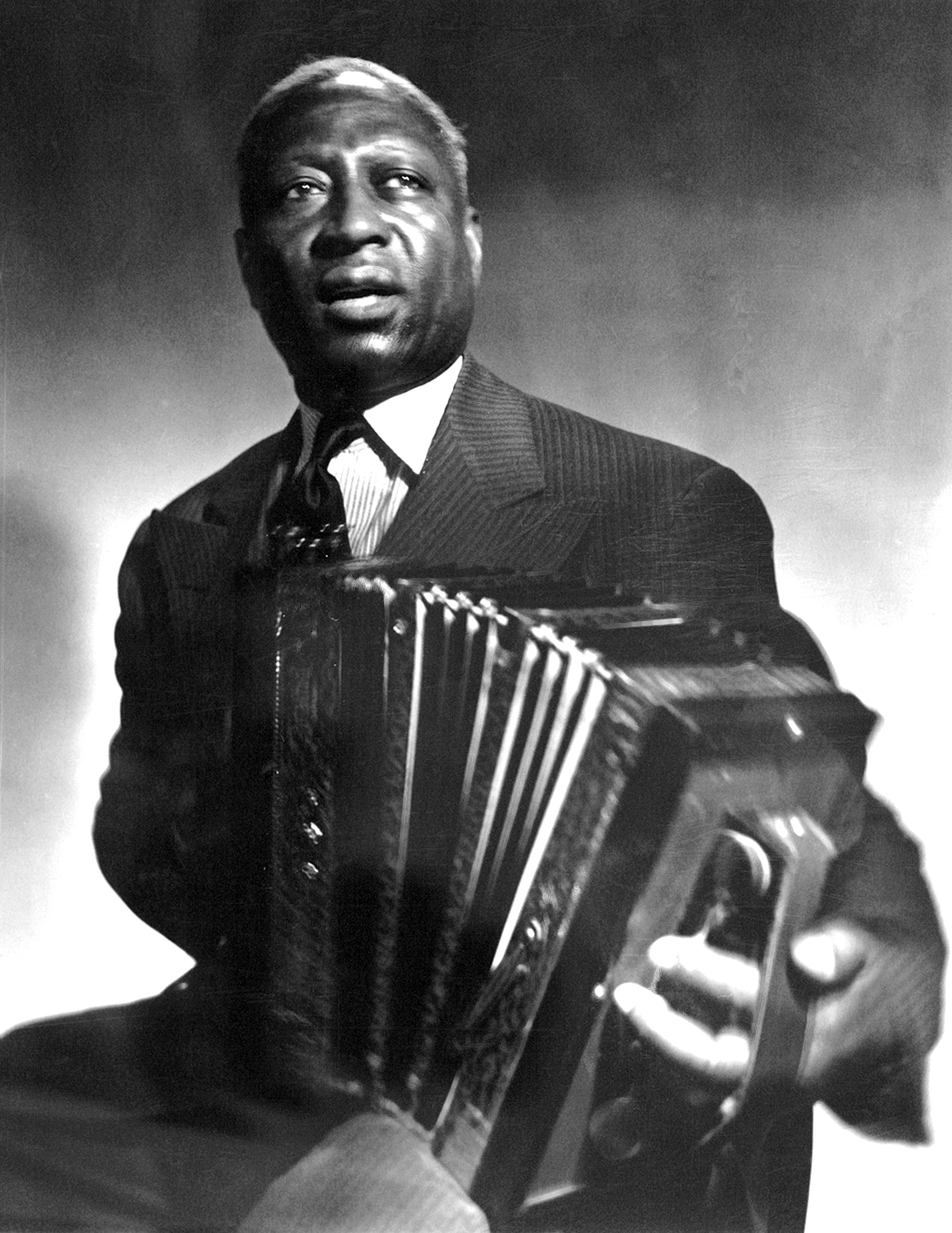
Huddie William Ledbetter (1888–1949), better known as Lead Belly

As part of the Federal Art Project that began in 1935, the song was published in 1936, in Lomax's version, as "Goodnight, Irene", a joint Ledbetter-Lomax composition. It has a straightforward verse–chorus form, but is in waltz time. It is a three-chord song, characterized as a "folk ballad" with a three-phrase melody, with provenance in 19th-century popular music transmitted by oral tradition.

"Irene" has been styled by Neil V. Rosenberg a "folk recomposition" of the 1886 song "Irene Good Night" by Gussie L. Davis. Hank Williams connected the melody to the English ballad tradition, via a mountain song he knew as "Pere Ellen". Lead Belly's account was of performing "Irene" by 1908, in a way he learned from his uncles Ter(r)ell and Bob. By the 1930s, he had made the song his own, modifying the rhythm and rewriting most of the verses. John and Alan Lomax made a field recording of Bob Ledbetter's version of the song.

Lead Belly continued performing the song during his prison terms. An extended version of the song that includes narratives connecting the verses appears in the 1936 songbook Negro Folk Songs as Sung by Lead Belly. In 1941, Woody Guthrie used the melody for his New Deal anthem "Roll On, Columbia, Roll On".

"Irene" remained a staple of Lead Belly's performances throughout the 1930s and 1940s. In 2002, Lead Belly's Library of Congress recording received a Grammy Hall of Fame Award.

== Version by the Weavers ==
In 1950, one year after Lead Belly's death, the American folk band the Weavers recorded a version of "Goodnight, Irene". It was a B-side track on the Decca label, produced by Milt Gabler. The arranger was Gordon Jenkins. who conducted the Weavers and his Gordon Jenkins Orchestra for the recording. It was a national hit, as was the A-side, a version of "Tzena, Tzena, Tzena"; sales were recorded as 2 million copies.

The single first reached the Billboard Best Sellers in Stores chart on June 30, 1950, and lasted 25 weeks on the chart, peaking at No. 1 for 13 weeks. Although generally faithful, the Weavers chose to omit some of Lead Belly's lyrics, leading Time magazine to label it a "dehydrated" and "prettied up" version of the original. The Weavers' lyrics are the ones now generally used, and Billboard ranked this version as the No. 1 song of 1950. This song closed the Weavers' historic final concert on November 28, 1980.

== Covers ==
After the Weavers' success, many other artists released versions of the song, some of which were commercially successful in several genres. Frank Sinatra's cover, released a month after the Weavers', lasted nine weeks on the Billboard magazine Best Seller chart on July 10, peaking at No. 5. Later that same year, Ernest Tubb and Red Foley had a number 1 country music record with the song, and the Alexander Brothers, Dennis Day and Jo Stafford released versions which made the Best Seller chart, peaking at number 26, number 17 and number 9 respectively. Moon Mullican had a number 5 country hit with it in 1950, and a version by Paul Gayten and his Orchestra reached number 6 on the Billboard R&B chart in the same year.

On the Cash Box chart, where all available versions were combined in the standings, the song reached a peak position of number 1 on September 2, 1950, and lasted at number 1 for 13 weeks.

Raffi sang the song on his 1979 children's album The Corner Grocery Store, but with modified lyrics about where different animals sleep.

The song was the basis for the 1950 parody called "Please Say Goodnight to the Guy, Irene" by Ziggy Talent. It also inspired the 1954 "answer" record "Wake Up, Irene" by Hank Thompson, a No. 1 on Billboard's country chart.

The Sensational Alex Harvey Band included a live version on their 1976 album The Penthouse Tapes.

Tom Waits's cover was included on Orphans: Brawlers, Bawlers and Bastards; Keith Richards covered it on his third solo album, Crosseyed Heart.

Moxy Früvous sang the chorus of the song in the middle of "The Drinking Song", a track from their 1993 album, Bargainville.

=== Other hit versions ===
- 1959: Billy Williams reached number 75 on the US Billboard pop chart.
- 1962: Jerry Reed reached number 79 on the US pop chart.

== Use in football ==
"Goodnight, Irene" is sung by supporters of English football team Bristol Rovers. It was first sung at a fireworks display at the Stadium the night before a home game against Plymouth Argyle in 1950. During the game, the following day, Rovers were winning quite comfortably and the few Argyle supporters present began to leave early prompting a chorus of "Goodnight Argyle" from the Rovers supporters—the tune stuck and "Goodnight, Irene" became the club song. The song was sung by Plymouth Argyle supporters for a long time before this and this added to the goading by the Bristol Rovers fans.

== Other uses ==
In professional wrestling, "Adorable" Adrian Adonis frequently referred to his finishing move—a standard sleeperhold—as "Goodnight, Irene."

In the 2013 video game BioShock Infinite, the song is heard being sung at the Raffle Fair, in the beginning of the game. It is an early indication of the anachronistic nature of the story, as it is set in 1912.

In Team Fortress 2, when revenge-killing an enemy or jeering as the Engineer, he has a chance to say: "Oh, good night, Irene!".

== See also ==
- "If It Had Not Been For Jesus", a Christian gospel sung to the same tune, first recorded in 1930 by Blind Willie Johnson
