= Medicine Show =

A medicine show is a traveling act that uses entertainment to sell patent medicines.

(The) Medicine Show may also refer to

== Comedy ==
- The Medicine Show (film), a 1933 Krazy Kat cartoon
- The Pink Medicine Show, a 1978 sketch comedy program featuring Rob Buckman

== Fiction ==
- InterGalactic Medicine Show, an online science fiction magazine
  - Orson Scott Card's InterGalactic Medicine Show , an anthology of material originally published in it
- Medicine Show, a 1994 novel by Jody Lynn Nye

== Drama ==
- Medicine Show (play), a 1940 play by Oscar Saul and Hoffman Reynolds Hayes
- "Medicine Show", a 1952 episode of The Adventures of Wild Bill Hickok
- "Medicine Show", a 1958 episode of Union Pacific
- "The Great American Medicine Show", a 1993 episode of Dr. Quinn, Medicine Woman

== Music ==
- Medicine Show (album), a 1984 album by The Dream Syndicate
- The Medicine Show (album), a 2019 album by Melissa Etheridge
- Madlib Medicine Show, a series of albums by Madlib
- "Medicine Show" (song), a 1985 song by Big Audio Dynamite
- "The W.S. Walcott Medicine Show, a 1970 song by Robbie Robertson
- "The Incredible Medicine Show", a song by Moxy Früvous from their 1997 album You Will Go to the Moon
- Old Crow Medicine Show, a string band
  - Old Crow Medicine Show (album), their 2004 album
- Dr. West's Medicine Show and Junk Band, a psychedelic rock band
- Dr. Hook & the Medicine Show, a rock band
- MV & EE, a neo-psychedelic band who also recorded under the name "MV & EE Medicine Show"
