= Binding to the peace =

Binding to the peace and a number of similar expressions may refer to:

- Peace bond, in Canadian law
- Binding over order to keep peace, in the law of England and Wales and in other common law jurisdictions such as Hong Kong
