= Live Noise =

Live album by Moxy Früvous
- Released: May 19, 1998
- Recorded: The Tralfamadore, Buffalo, New York, October 3–4, 1997; The TLA, Philadelphia, Pennsylvania, November 14, 1997; Mercury Lounge, New York City, November 15–17, 1997; The Met Café, Providence, Rhode Island, December 6, 1997
- Genre: Rock/Folk/Pop
- Length: 69:39
- Label: The Bottom Line Record Co., LLC/Velvel Records, LLC
- Producer: Moxy Früvous

Moxy Früvous chronology
You Will Go to the Moon (1997)	Live Noise (1998)	Thornhill (1999)

Professional ratings
Review scores
Source	Rating
AllMusic	4.5/5 stars

Live Noise is a 1998 live album by Canadian band Moxy Früvous, their only major-label live album. Material on the album includes songs from all of their studio albums (with minor lyrical changes on some songs), along with three covers and witty banter from the shows. It is a compilation of several recordings over the course of 1997.

== Track listing ==
1. "Michigan Militia" – 3:30 {p}
2. "Jockey Full o'Bourbon" – 3:06 (by Tom Waits) {p}
3. "Intra-Pennsylvania Rivalry" – 1:21 {p}
4. "Horseshoes" – 4:24 {p}
5. "Good Date Band?" – 1:28 {p}
6. "Fly" – 5:23 {n}
7. "Boo Time" – 3:52 {b}
8. "Kirk King Intro" – 0:44 {n}
9. "King of Spain" – 3:14 {b}
10. "Lowest Highest Point* [Improv]" – 3:10 {r}
11. "B.J. Don't Cry" – 3:21 {n}
12. "Johnny Saucep'n" – 1:27 {b}
13. "Nature Sounds" – 0:49 {n}
14. "I've Gotta Get a Message to You" – 3:24 (Bee Gees cover, by Barry Gibb/Robin Gibb/Maurice Gibb) {p}
15. "My Baby Loves a Bunch of Authors" – 2:49 {n}
16. "Naked Puppets" - 1:02 {n}
17. "No No Raja" - 3:02 {n}
18. "Video Bargainville" - 4:10 {b}
19. "Kasparov vs. Deep Blue" - 3:27 {^}
20. "Psycho Killer" - 4:27 (Talking Heads cover, by David Byrne# [sic]) {n}
21. "Losers" - 0:09 {b}
22. "King of Spain [Cranky Monarch Version]" - 5:18 {b}
23. "The Drinking Song" - 6:05 (contains elements from the Lead Belly song "Goodnight, Irene", by Huddie Ledbetter and John A. Lomax) {b}

All songs by Moxy Früvous except where noted. City code {Philadelphia=p, New York=n, Buffalo=b, Providence=r}, where the track was recorded, is in curly brackets.

- *The debate over which state has "The Lowest Highest Point" is often disputed, and the state with the lowest highest point is incorrectly given as Delaware, when in fact, it is Florida. The reason for this mistake is reportedly from a misunderstanding of an answer in the game Trivial Pursuit, in which the question was, "Which state has the lowest mean elevation", to which Delaware is the correct answer.
- ^Recorded during a small show at the Massachusetts Institute of Technology on May 17, 1997.
- #The liner notes only show Byrne as the composer, but the song was composed by David Byrne, Chris Frantz, and Tina Weymouth.
