= Jila Ghomeshi =

Persian-Canadian linguist

- Relatives: Jian Ghomeshi

Academic background
- Education: University of Toronto
- Doctoral advisor: Diane Massam

Academic work
- Discipline: Linguistics
- Sub-discipline: Theoretical syntax
- Institutions: University of Manitoba

Jila Ghomeshi is a Persian-Canadian linguist. She earned her Ph.D. in 1996 from the University of Toronto, under the supervision of Diane Massam. She is currently a professor of linguistics at the University of Manitoba, where she has been since 1998.

Ghomeshi received the National Achievement Award presented by the Canadian Linguistic Association in 2014, in recognition of her contribution in educating the broader public about linguistic issues, such as language discrimination and the distinction between prescriptive and descriptive grammar. This is addressed in her 2010 book, Grammar Matters: The Social Significance of How We Use Language.

Ghomeshi also does research in theoretical syntax, including the syntax of Persian, and the interfaces with pragmatics and morphology. She is co-editor of a book, with Ileana Paul and Martina Wiltschko, called Determiners: Universals and variation on cross-linguistic universals and variation in the syntax of determiners.

Ghomeshi is the sister of former CBC broadcaster Jian Ghomeshi.

== Selected honors ==
- Canadian Linguistic Association National Achievement Award, 2014

== Key publications ==
- Ghomeshi, J.and D. Massam. 1994. "Lexical/syntactic relations without projection," Linguistic Analysis.
- Ghomeshi, Jila (1 November 1997). "Non-Projecting Nouns and the Ezafe: Construction in Persian". Natural Language & Linguistic Theory. 15 (4): 729–788. doi:10.1023/A:1005886709040. S2CID 170146072.
- Ghomeshi, J. 2001. "Control and thematic agreement," Canadian Journal of Linguistics.
- Ghomeshi, J. 2003 "Plural marking, indefiniteness, and the noun phrase," Studia Linguistica.
- Ghomeshi, Jila; Jackendoff, Ray; Rosen, Nicole; Russell, Kevin (1 May 2004). "Contrastive Focus Reduplication in English (The Salad-Salad Paper)". Natural Language & Linguistic Theory. 22 (2): 307–357. doi:10.1023/B:NALA.0000015789.98638.f9. S2CID 170949456.
- Jila Ghomeshi, Ileana Paul and Martina Wiltschko (eds.) 2009. Determiners: Universals and variation. Amsterdam/Philadelphia: John Benjamins.
- Ghomeshi, Jila. Grammar Matters: The Social Significance of How We Use Language. Winnipeg: Arbeiter Ring, 2010. ISBN 978-1894037-44-0
