= Grant Huscroft =

Canadian jurist and legal scholar

The Honourable Grant Huscroft

Justice of the Court of Appeal for Ontario
- Incumbent
- Assumed office December 16, 2014
- Nominated by: Stephen Harper
- Appointed by: David Johnston
- Preceded by: Marc Rosenberg

Personal details
- Spouse: Tracy Shultis
- Children: 2
- Education: University of Western Ontario; Queen's University; University of Auckland

Grant A. Huscroft is a Canadian jurist and legal scholar. He has served as a justice of the Court of Appeal for Ontario since 2014.

== Biography ==
Huscroft was educated at the University of Western Ontario (BA 1980), Queen's University (LL.B. 1984), and the University of Auckland (LL.M. 1987).

Huscroft taught at the University of Auckland Law School between 1992 and 2001 and then the University of Western Ontario Faculty of Law from 2002 to 2014, where he was Associate Dean from 2006 to 2008.

Huscroft was appointed to the Court of Appeal for Ontario in 2014 on the advice of Prime Minister Stephen Harper.

During his time on the bench, Huscroft was in the habit of giving lectures to law students at their university. For instance, in a January 2016 appearance at Queen's University, he said that:

The most important thing I learned as an academic is that disagreement is almost always in good faith. I think we have to approach disputes about rights or the Charter with a great deal of humility and we have to start with the position that however strongly we may feel, we might be wrong.

Huscroft also has participated in Canadian Institute for the Administration of Justice seminars, such as when he presented a paper on "Sufficiency of tribunal reasons: when do a tribunal’s reasons engage issues of procedural fairness" at their May 2016 Advanced Judicial Seminar on Administrative Law reunion.

== Notable judgments ==
=== In re Greenhouse Gas Pollution Pricing Act ===
In June 2019, Huscroft wrote in his dissenting GHGPPA opinion that the decision of the majority could have repercussions to the existing that division of powers between the provinces and the federal government. He noted: "federalism is no constitutional nicety; it is a defining feature of the Canadian constitutional order that governs the way in which even the most serious problems must be addressed" and "in effect, [the federal government] has asked the court to sanction a change to the constitutional order -- to increase Parliament's lawmaking authority while diminishing that of the provincial legislatures, and to do so on a permanent basis." Huscroft's dissent was described as "traditionalist" in its view of the division of powers and compared to Gérard La Forest, a former puis-ne on the Supreme Court of Canada, by former Attorney-General Peter MacKay.

== Published works ==
=== In the popular press ===
Huscroft outlined his criticism of the Canadian Charter of Rights and Freedoms in a 2012 newspaper article. He argued that the passage of the Charter has provided constitutional status to rights and freedoms while empowering judges to strike down laws passed by democratically elected representatives that are seen to infringe on these rights and freedoms, and that this has resulted in political questions increasingly being brought before the courts and out of the purview of elected representatives. In his view, judges do not have any greater insights into complex social and moral issues than any other person, and therefore the power to find solutions to these issues must be put back in the hands of democratically elected representatives. In support of his position, he pointed out that many judicial decisions interpreting and applying the charter have been controversial, and the opinions of Supreme Court judges have often been divided in these cases.

=== Articles ===
- Huscroft, Grant (2006). "Political Litigation and the Role of the Court". The Supreme Court Law Review: Osgoode's Annual Constitutional Cases Conference. 34.

=== Learned texts, as editor ===
- Expounding the constitution : essays in constitutional theory. Cambridge University Press. 2008. ISBN 9789780521882, 9780521887410.
- Litigating rights : perspectives from domestic and international law. Hart. 2002. ISBN 9781841131948.
- Rights and freedoms : the New Zealand Bill of Rights Act 1990 and the Human Rights Act 1993. Brooker's. 1995. ISBN 9780864721785.
- The challenge of originalism : theories of constitutional interpretation. Cambridge University Press. 2011. ISBN 9781107013254.
- Inside and outside Canadian administrative law : essays in honour of David Mullan. University of Toronto Press. 2006. ISBN 9780802092458.
- A simple common lawyer : essays in honour of Michael Taggart. Hart. 2009. ISBN 9781841139234.
- Proportionality and the rule of law : rights, justification, reasoning. Cambridge University Press. 2014. ISBN 9781107064072, 9781107647954.
- Huscroft, Grant; Brodie, Ian (2004). Constitutionalism in the Charter Era. Markham, Ont: LexisNexis Butterworths. ISBN 9780433444398. "Papers presented at the Constitutionalism in the Charter era conference, held at University of Western Ontario, on Sept. 12, 2003. Reprinted from volume 23 of the Supreme Court law review second series."
