= 50 Tracks =

Canadian radio program

50 Tracks is a Canadian radio program, which aired on CBC Radio One in 2004 and 2005. The show, hosted by Jian Ghomeshi, was a listener vote to determine the 50 most essential songs in pop music history, through a mix of listener voting and selection by celebrity guests.

Each week, three celebrity guests nominated songs from each time period, to arrive at a list of four songs. In the next few days, listeners would then vote on a fifth selection from the remaining nominated songs that had not been selected by the debate's panelists. At the series conclusion listeners voted on these songs, plus 10 additional songs suggested by listeners.

The 2004 edition of the series concentrated on pop music from anywhere in the world, while the 2005 edition concentrated on Canadian music. One song, Alanis Morissette's "You Oughta Know", was selected for both lists.

In the fall of 2005, CBC Radio launched the series The National Playlist, which took a similar format and adapted it to a weekly series.

== Participants ==
Panelists in 2005 included Terry David Mulligan, Jay Ferguson, Lorraine Segato, Laurie Brown, Damhnait Doyle, Denise Donlon, Geoff Pevere, Leah McLaren, Lee Aaron, Jennifer Hollett, and Emm Gryner.

== 50 Tracks (2004) ==
1. John Lennon, "Imagine"
2. The Beatles, "In My Life"
3. Bob Dylan, "Like a Rolling Stone"
4. U2, "With or Without You"
5. Nirvana, "Smells Like Teen Spirit"
6. Judy Garland, "Somewhere Over the Rainbow"
7. Led Zeppelin, "Stairway to Heaven"
8. The Rolling Stones, "(I Can't Get No) Satisfaction"
9. Glenn Miller, "In the Mood"
10. Chuck Berry, "Johnny B. Goode"
11. Bob Marley, "One Love/People Get Ready"
12. The Beatles, "A Day in the Life"
13. The Clash, "London Calling"
14. Woody Guthrie, "This Land Is Your Land"
15. Steppenwolf, "Born to Be Wild"
16. The Byrds, "Mr. Tambourine Man"
17. The Beach Boys, "Good Vibrations"
18. Elvis Presley, "Heartbreak Hotel"
19. Bruce Springsteen, "Born to Run"
20. Billie Holiday, "Strange Fruit"
21. Louis Armstrong, "Stardust"
22. Hank Williams, "Your Cheatin' Heart"
23. David Bowie, "Heroes"
24. Michael Jackson, "Billie Jean"
25. The Sex Pistols, "God Save the Queen"
26. The Bee Gees, "Stayin' Alive"
27. Ella Fitzgerald, "How High the Moon"
28. Radiohead, "Paranoid Android"
29. Bill Haley & His Comets, "Rock Around the Clock"
30. Alanis Morissette, "You Oughta Know"
31. Ray Charles, "What'd I Say"
32. Bing Crosby, "Brother Can You Spare a Dime?"
33. The Temptations, "My Girl"
34. Harald Paulsen, "Die Moritat von Mackie Messer (Mack the Knife)"
35. Prince, "When Doves Cry"
36. Public Enemy, "Fight the Power"
37. Bessie Smith, "St. Louis Blues"
38. Lou Reed, "Walk on the Wild Side"
39. Scott Joplin, "Maple Leaf Rag"
40. Sarah Vaughan, "Misty"
41. Robert Johnson, "I Believe I'll Dust My Broom"
42. Nat King Cole, "Nature Boy"
43. Arthur "Big Boy" Crudup, "That's Alright Mama"
44. The Supremes, "Stop! In the Name of Love"
45. Louis Armstrong, "Potato Head Blues"
46. Lauryn Hill, "Doo Wop (That Thing)"
47. Grandmaster Flash and The Furious Five, "The Message"
48. Jimmie Rodgers, "Blue Yodel No. 1 (T for Texas)"
49. Louis Jordan, "Saturday Night Fish Fry"
50. Mary J. Blige, "Real Love"

== 50 Tracks: The Canadian Edition (2005) ==
1. Ian and Sylvia, "Four Strong Winds"
2. Barenaked Ladies, "If I Had $1000000"
3. Neil Young, "Heart of Gold"
4. Stan Rogers, "Northwest Passage"
5. The Guess Who, "American Woman"
6. Gordon Lightfoot, "Canadian Railroad Trilogy"
7. Joni Mitchell, "Both Sides Now"
8. Leonard Cohen, "Suzanne"
9. Joni Mitchell, "Big Yellow Taxi"
10. Gordon Lightfoot, "Early Morning Rain"
11. Bruce Cockburn, "Lovers in a Dangerous Time"
12. Stompin' Tom Connors, "The Hockey Song"
13. Tom Cochrane, "Life Is a Highway"
14. Blue Rodeo, "Try"
15. The Band, "The Weight"
16. The Tragically Hip, "New Orleans Is Sinking"
17. Bryan Adams, "Summer of '69"
18. Bachman–Turner Overdrive, "Takin' Care of Business"
19. Anne Murray, "Snowbird"
20. Sarah McLachlan, "Angel"
21. k.d. lang, "Constant Craving"
22. Spirit of the West, "Home for a Rest"
23. The Guess Who, "These Eyes"
24. Neil Young, "Rockin' in the Free World"
25. Gordon Lightfoot, "Sundown"
26. Buffy Sainte-Marie, "Universal Soldier"
27. The Tragically Hip, "Courage (for Hugh MacLennan)"
28. Alanis Morissette, "You Oughta Know"
29. Bruce Cockburn, "Wondering Where the Lions Are"
30. Gilles Vigneault, "Mon Pays"
31. Trooper, "Raise a Little Hell"
32. Blue Rodeo, "Hasn't Hit Me Yet"
33. Rush, "Tom Sawyer"
34. Hank Snow, "I'm Movin' On"
35. Martha and the Muffins, "Echo Beach"
36. Men Without Hats, "The Safety Dance"
37. k-os, "Crabbuckit"
38. Rough Trade, "High School Confidential"
39. Sam Roberts, "Brother Down"
40. Paul Anka, "Diana"
41. Ron Hynes, "Sonny's Dream"
42. Leonard Cohen, "Tower of Song"
43. The Crew Cuts, "Sh-Boom"
44. Parachute Club, "Rise Up"
45. Sloan, "Coax Me"
46. Maestro Fresh Wes, "Let Your Backbone Slide"
47. Ruth Lowe, "I'll Never Smile Again" (performed by the Tommy Dorsey Orchestra)
48. Rush, "Fly By Night"
49. D.O.A., "Disco Sucks"
50. Wilf Carter, "My Swiss Moonlight Lullaby"
