= The National Playlist =

The National Playlist was a Canadian radio show, which aired weekdays at 11:30 a.m. and Saturday evenings at 9 p.m. on CBC Radio One in 2005 and 2006. Hosted by Jian Ghomeshi, the program was a weekly competition to choose 10 songs for the "national playlist".

On the weekday shows, Ghomeshi and three guests — musicians, CBC journalists, music critics or other celebrities — debated eight songs, which were then voted on by CBC radio listeners. The four most popular songs of those eight, as chosen by Ghomeshi and the guests, were then added to the previous week's top ten chart. A listener vote was conducted online to select the top six songs from the previous week's list and compile the new top ten. On the Saturday evening program, the week's "top ten" chart was counted down.

The program evolved out of Ghomeshi's earlier special series for CBC radio, 50 Tracks and 50 Tracks: The Canadian Version. The show's theme song consisted of instrumental segments from "Crosseyed and Painless" by Talking Heads.

On March 24, 2006, Ghomeshi announced that the show was coming to end. The final broadcast of The National Playlist was April 1, 2006.
