= My Baby Loves a Bunch of Authors =

Single by Moxy Früvous

from the album Bargainville
- Released: 1993
- Genre: Folk rock, comedy rock
- Length: 2:33
- Label: Warner Music Canada

Moxy Früvous singles chronology
"Stuck in the 90's" (1993)	"My Baby Loves a Bunch of Authors" (1993)	"Fell in Love" (1994)

"My Baby Loves a Bunch of Authors" is a song by Canadian folk group Moxy Früvous. It was commissioned by the Canadian Broadcasting Company, written for the CBC Radio show Later the Same Day, as a comment on the Toronto International Festival of Authors in November 1991. It mentions famous authors, many Canadian.

The song was first recorded for their self-titled independent cassette in 1992. It was re-recorded in 1993 for their debut album, Bargainville, with a few changes to the lyrics, including the replacement of some authors with others. The Bargainville version is the one best known to fans, and was also the one performed live by the band, as on their live album Live Noise. The Bargainville version was released as the second single from the album, and reached #1 on the RPM Canadian Content chart.

The song tells the story of a man whose girlfriend seems to be more interested in books than in him. The man is frustrated when he starts having other reading-related problems (such as his doctor delaying their appointment until after he finishes his book, and his relationship counsellor giving him a bunch of books to read). Eventually he comes around, however, when he and his significant other attend an author's night event where they meet and party with several famous authors, leading the singer to declare, "these writer types are a scream!" The band tweaked the song in reaction to events. The Robertson Davies couplet was originally "Who needs a shave? He's/Robertson Davies!" After the author's death in 1995, the band replaced the word "shave" with "grave."

== Authors mentioned in the song ==
In the album version, the authors mentioned are, in order:

- Gabriel García Márquez
- William S. Burroughs (not in the original version)
- bell hooks (Jane Rule in the original version)
- Pierre Berton
- Mario Puzo (Daniel Richler in the original version)
- W.P. Kinsella
- Margaret Atwood
- Robertson Davies (mentioned twice in the original version)
- Michael Ondaatje
- Doris Lessing

The tabloid newspaper, the Toronto Sun, is also mentioned.
