= Wood (Moxy Früvous album) =

Studio album by Moxy Früvous
- Released: June 27, 1995
- Genre: Folk, rock
- Length: 51:19
- Label: WEA
- Producer: Michael Koppelman, Moxy Früvous

Moxy Früvous chronology
Bargainville (1993)	Wood (1995)	The 'b' Album (1996)

Professional ratings
Review scores
Source	Rating
AllMusic	4.5/5 stars
The Encyclopedia of Popular Music	2/5 stars
MusicHound Rock: The Essential Album Guide	2.5/5 stars

Wood is the second studio album by Canadian artists Moxy Früvous, released in 1995. The album was intended to reflect more mature, serious songwriting, in contrast to their prior albums, which had focused more on wit and humor. "Down from Above" was released as a single from the album.

== Critical reception ==
Trouser Press called the band "a latter-day acoustic America," writing that "the sweet singing and a hint of wit faintly echo Bargainville."

== Track listing ==
1. "Down from Above" – 4:34
2. "Horseshoes" – 3:57
3. "Fly" – 4:57
4. "The Present Tense Tureen" – 3:38
5. "Poor Mary Lane" – 3:28
6. "On Her Doorstep" – 3:22
7. "Misplaced" – 4:35
8. "It's Too Cold" – 3:26
9. "Bed and Breakfast" – 4:11
10. "Nuits de Rêve" – 6:05
11. "Sad Today" – 4:26
12. "Organ Grinder" (hidden track, – 2:39)
- The hidden track "Organ Grinder" is recorded on the CD as an extension to track 11 "Sad Today," with a silent gap of 2 minutes separating the songs.

== See also ==
- 1995 in music
