= Kathryn Borel =

Canadian writer, editor and radio producer

- Born: June 23, 1979 (age 47); Toronto, Ontario, Canada
- Education: University of King's College
- Occupations: Writer, editor and radio producer

Kathryn Borel (born June 23, 1979) is a Canadian writer, editor and radio producer. She was a founding producer of the CBC Radio One show Q. Borel is the author of Corked: A Memoir (2009).

== Personal life ==
Borel was born in Toronto. She studied journalism at the University of King's College, a liberal arts university in Halifax, Nova Scotia. She is an atheist.

== Career ==
=== Broadcasting ===
Borel has written and broadcast for many local and national programs on CBC Radio One, including Metro Morning, GO!, Q, Day 6 and As It Happens.

=== Writing ===
Her print journalism includes a past column for the National Post called "Indignities," and a food column, "Column Dine," for Eye Weekly. She has written for The Guardian, The Times of London, The Believer, The Globe and Mail, EnRoute, the Toronto Star, The Walrus, Salon.com, and Nerve.com. She is listed as of 2015 as an interview editor at The Believer.

Borel's Corked: A Memoir (2009) was nominated for the Stephen Leacock Award in 2010. According to a Globe and Mail review, the memoir "recalls two darkly humorous weeks in a tumultuous father-daughter relationship, replete with the author's mutually escalating insecurities: insecurity about paternal love and the inevitability of death, lover love, wine love, wine speak and insecurity about insecurity." Jay McInerney, New York Times bestselling author of How It Ended, called it funny, quirky and bittersweet. The National Post, Quill & Quire and Eye Weekly cited it as one of the best books of 2009.

Borel's film and television work includes the USA Network's Rush, American Dad! on TBS, the Adult Swim series Mostly For Millennials, and Anne with an E on Netflix. In 2019, she was nominated for a Canadian Screenwriting Award for Best Drama Writing for episode 203 of Anne with an E.

== Jian Ghomeshi controversy ==
In December 2014, The Guardian published an article by Borel in which she described having been sexually harassed by former CBC Radio host Jian Ghomeshi while she was a producer for Q from 2007 to 2010. She approached her union, the Canadian Media Guild, for assistance, and wrote that the union representative and Q's executive producer both failed to act. As a result, she left the CBC in 2010 and moved to Los Angeles.

The CBC fired Ghomeshi in October 2014 after reviewing "graphic evidence" that he had caused physical injury to a woman. In April 2015, an independent inquiry concluded that CBC management had mishandled—and in some cases condoned—his abusive behavior. He was charged with several accounts of sexual assault in relation to other women and was acquitted in March 2016.

An additional charge of sexual assault against Borel was to be addressed at trial in June 2016. There was a publication ban on Borel's name at the time, later lifted. On May 11, 2016, the Crown withdrew the charge. In return Ghomeshi signed a peace bond and, in court, read a formal apology to Borel without acknowledging assault. "No workplace friendship or creative environment excuses this sort of behaviour," he stated, "especially when there's a power imbalance as there was with Ms. Borel."

Later that day Borel issued a statement, insisting that Ghomeshi was guilty of sexual assault. "He made it clear that he could humiliate me repeatedly and walk away with impunity. There are at least three documented incidents of physical touching," she said. "Jian Ghomeshi is guilty of having done the things that I've outlined today ... And that is what Jian Ghomeshi just apologized for: the crime of sexual assault ... So when it was presented to me that the defence would be offering us an apology, I was prepared to forego the trial. It seemed like the clearest path to the truth. A trial would have maintained his lie, the lie that he was not guilty, and would have further subjected me to the very same pattern of abuse that I am currently trying to stop."

Borel was critical of the CBC for its handling of her complaint. "When I went to the CBC for help, what I received in return was a directive that, yes, he could do this and, yes, it was my job to let him," she said. The CBC apologized to Borel publicly, on May 11, the second such apology by the corporation. In a statement, head of public affairs Chuck Thompson said, "What Ms. Borel experienced in our workplace should never have happened and we sincerely apologize."
