= Murray Foster =

Canadian musician, songwriter, director, playwright, screenwriter and environmentalist

Murray Douglas Foster (born June 29, 1967) is a Canadian musician, vocalist, songwriter, director, playwright, screenwriter, and environmentalist. He is best known for his work as electric and upright bassist in the Canadian bands Moxy Früvous and Great Big Sea. In 2014, he directed the independent film, The Cocksure Lads Movie. He and Mike Ford also perform in live performance as a 1960s British Invasion styled band, The Cocksure Lads.

== History ==
Foster was born in Thornhill, Ontario. At age 12, he and Jian Ghomeshi went to their first gig: a Peter Frampton concert. He attended Thornlea Secondary School, and graduated with a BA in English Literature from the University of Toronto.

== Music ==
=== Tall New Buildings ===
In the late 1980s, Foster played bass in the new wave band Tall New Buildings, alongside vocalist Jian Ghomeshi, guitarist Tracy Jones, Reno Manfredi on keyboards and drummer John Ruttle.

=== Moxy Früvous ===
Foster started Moxy Früvous in 1990 with Jian Ghomeshi, Mike Ford and Dave Matheson. The band developed a cult following and toured extensively for ten years. They released eight albums and were featured on Late Night with Conan O'Brien in October 1999.

=== Great Big Sea ===
In 2003, Foster began touring with Great Big Sea after founding bass player Darrell Power left the band. Over the course of 10 years with the band, Foster's role evolved. In 2012, he co-wrote the a cappella ballad "Safe Upon the Shore" with Séan McCann.

=== The Cocksure Lads ===
In 2010, Foster and Mike Ford recorded a CD under the name The Cocksure Lads. Called The Greatest Hits of The Cocksure Lads (1963-1968), its 12 tracks were written over the previous decade. Their second CD, Mad! Lad! Plan!, was released on January 24, 2014. The live band is a separate project from The Cocksure Lads Movie.

=== The Lesters ===
In the early 2000s, Foster joined with Tory Cassis and Jeff Ulster to form The Lesters, an acoustic vocal jazz trio modelled on the Nat King Cole trio. After focusing on 1940s and 1950s jazz for the first ten years of their existence, The Lesters began writing original songs for a six-song EP which was released in 2017.

== Musical theatre ==
=== Chelsea Sunrise ===
In 2017, Foster and Mike Ford were invited to adapt The Cocksure Lads Movie into a musical at Sheridan College's Canadian Music Theatre Project incubator. The resulting show was named Chelsea Sunrise.

The Quest

In 2021, Foster teamed up with Kieren MacMillan for his next musical The Quest. The show was presented by the Stirling Festival Theatre Young Company in October 2023.

== Film ==
=== The Cocksure Lads Movie ===
After writing several short plays, Foster was asked by Emily Andrews of Filmcoop Toronto to write film scripts. His short film, The Picture, premiered at the Hamilton Film Festival in 2012.

Foster then wrote the screenplay for a full-length feature film, The Cocksure Lads Movie. Avi Federgreen, a 20-year veteran of the Canadian film industry took on the film's executive producer role.

The money to make the film came from many sources. In 2012, a Kickstarter campaign raised $28,000 to begin work on the movie. In September 2013, Foster began a second round of independent fundraising with a self-run campaign that featured backer rewards such as Postcards from the Road (Great Big Sea's XX tour), private lessons in anything over Skype, a song performed with the band, Backer Beer, a cast-signed script or lookbook, a part in the film, a session with the editor, a house concert, or even the chance to beat the director at board games. Foster and Ford performed pop-up performances at the 2013 Toronto International Film Festival to promote the film. On April 10, 2014, Foster, Ford, and their band made a pitch to the Dragon's Den television programme. The episode aired in January 2015. Dragons Arlene Dickinson and Mike Wekerle backed the project at $50,000 each.

Filming began in April 2014 in Toronto and production wrapped later that spring. The cast included UK Emmerdale soap opera phenom Lyndon Ogbourne as Dusty, Adam McNab as Reg, Luke Marty as Derek, and Ed Hillier as Blakey. Guest stars included Alan Doyle, Walk Off The Earth, and Matt Galloway.

The feature won much acclaim at the 2014 Whistler Film Festival. The film debuted in Toronto at the Canadian Film Fest in March 2015. It was distributed nationally in August 2015. It has since acquired international distribution.

== Other projects ==
In 2009, Foster performed a well-received lead role in the theatrical production of the play Toronto Noir in the Summerworks Theatre Festival.

In 2010, he and John Deere Credit Canada business analyst Brenda Morrow founded Platypus, the world's first green energy gift company. Patrons may purchase gifts of 100% renewable energy or donate to green energy projects worldwide on behalf of friends, family, clients or employees.

In January 2012, he wrote and recorded 30 songs in 30 days as part of the Stephen Lewis Foundation's DARE Campaign. The songs, made available to the public, raised almost $6,000 to fight AIDS in Africa.

Also in 2012, Foster was hired as the songwriting instructor by the Trebas Institute of Music in Toronto.

Foster supports various environmental causes, including the drive to expand safe cycling in Toronto. On September 8, 2013, he served as emcee of the Toronto Bicycle Music Festival.

On December 16, 2013, Toronto City Council endorsed the creation of the Toronto Music Industry Advisory Council to guide its efforts to support the economic and cultural development of the city's music industry. Foster was appointed to the board for his work as an independent artist.

In January 2014, Foster launched the Toronto Songwriting School, Canada's first institute devoted exclusively to songwriting, was a featured speaker at Nerd Nite Toronto, and released The Cocksure Lads' sophomore album.

In 2016, Murray Foster and Todd Green founded Choir Nation: Your Rockstar Moment. Pitched as a team-building service, Choir Nation puts participants into choir groups with celebrated Canadian musicians, with whom they rehearse and perform a concert.

From 2014–2016, Foster held the role of Executive Director for the non-profit Our Place Initiative.

He has also written articles for magazines such as Now, Driven and the online DailyXY.com.

In 2016, Foster partnered with Andreas Kalogiannidis to found the non-profit organization Toronto Music City, which is partnering with the City of Toronto and Daniels Developments to building affordable housing specifically for musicians. Their first such project breaks ground in Regent Park in summer 2017. Toronto Music City also has a mandate to update and coordinate music education services across the Greater Toronto Area.

In 2020, Foster was a finalist for the Roy Thomson Hall Award of Recognition.
