= The Cocksure Lads =

Canadian band

- Genre: Pop
- Years active: 2010-present

The Cocksure Lads is a Canadian British Invasion-style band led by Murray Foster and Mike Ford. The Cocksure Lads perform as a live band; there is also a movie about a fictional version of the band.

== History ==
The Cocksure Lads were dreamed up by Murray Foster and Mike Ford, two former members of the Canadian band Moxy Früvous in the late 1990s. Foster also played bass in the band Great Big Sea.

Foster and Ford shared a love of early 1960s Britpop and began writing songs in that genre for their own amusement. One song, "That's Any Good," was performed several times by Moxy Früvous.

As more and more of these British Invasion style tunes came to life, they began to develop a backstory to the band that had been named "The Cocksure Lads" by their friend Danny Ameri.

== Discography ==
In 2010, Foster and Ford released The Greatest Hits of the Cocksure Lads, 1963-1968. It featured 12 original songs. They began doing limited live appearances as The Cocksure Lads, accompanied by guitarist Tim Bovaconti and drummer Blake Manning. Their second CD MAD LAD PLAN was released on January 24, 2014.

=== The Greatest Hits of the Cocksure Lads, 1963-1968 by The Cocksure Lads ===
2010
No.	Title	Length
1.	"You’re A Cocksure Lad"	2:07
2.	"The Case of the Dropsies"	1:46
3.	"Ship’s Ahoy!"	2:37
4.	"Umbrella Girl"	4:09
5.	"Ticky Boo (Look Through My Window)"	2:10
6.	"That’s Any Good"	2:16
7.	"You Gotta Stay Cocksure"	1:53
8.	"The Car Boot Light That Never Quite Shuts Off"	2:01
9.	"Admiral Trafalgar"	1:57
10.	"Mushy Peas"	4:04
11.	"I’ve Already Been Loved, Love"	2:36
12.	"Wellies in the Bath"	0:43

=== MAD LAD PLAN by The Cocksure Lads ===
2014
No.	Title	Length
1.	"In London Town"	3:41
2.	"Mr. Man"	3:48
3.	"They All Wanted Me Back"	3:02
4.	"Yes I Do"	2:51
5.	"Not Today"	3:53
6.	"Say Uncle (Garant Said)"	2:58
7.	"When You Walk"	3:48
8.	"Paddington Way"	3:44
9.	"The Surprising Thing"	2:02
10.	"Easy Peasy"	2:19
11.	"Requiem for a Lad (featuring a midnight raid by the Woosleywumps)"	2:54
12.	"England My England"	2:12
13.	"Our Love Is Strong"	1:51

== The Cocksure Lads Movie ==
Murray Foster is the writer-director of The Cocksure Lads Movie. A member of two Canadian bands (Moxy Früvous and Great Big Sea) and a long-time writer for newspapers and magazines, Foster has written and directed several short films that have been accepted into Canadian film festivals, including The Picture, which was accepted into the Hamilton Film Festival in 2012.

The film went into production in Toronto, Ontario, in April 2014, and was shot entirely in Toronto. Kendel Carson, Alan Doyle, and Walk Off The Earth guest starred, as well as a main cast including Lyndon Ogbourne (of British soap Emmerdale fame) as Dusty, Adam McNab as Reg, Luke Marty as Derek, and Ed Hillier as Blakey.

Foster raised $28,000 in a Kickstarter in 2012 which helped to produce a trailer for the film. In September 2013, he began a second round of independent fundraising with a self-run campaign that features creative backer rewards such as Postcards from the Road (Great Big Sea's XX tour), private lessons in anything over Skype, a song performed with the band, Backer Beer, a cast-signed script or lookbook, a part in the film, a session with the editor, a house concert, or even the chance to beat the director at board games.

As an additional fundraising tactic, on April 10, 2014, Foster, Ford, and their band also made a pitch to the Dragon's Den television programme. The episode aired in January, 2015, revealing that the Dragons, Arlene Dickinson especially, accepted the proposal.

The feature was praised at the 2014 Whistler Film Festival.

The film debuted for Toronto audiences in March, 2015 at the Canadian Film Fest In the summer of 2015, the film screened at several national and international film festivals including in Shanghai, China, Madrid, Spain, and throughout the provinces of Alberta, Ontario, and British Columbia.

=== Plot ===
The Cocksure Lads arrive in Toronto on the morning of their first-ever North American tour, go to the venue and, ten minutes later, get into a fistfight and break up. The four Lads scatter, and spend the rest of the day wandering around town getting into misadventures: drinking, fighting, meeting women, taking baths, getting thrown out of pubs, having sex and falling in love. Through the course of these misadventures, they discover what it means to be a band–but can they patch things up before the big show?
