= Edward Greenspan =

Canadian lawyer and author

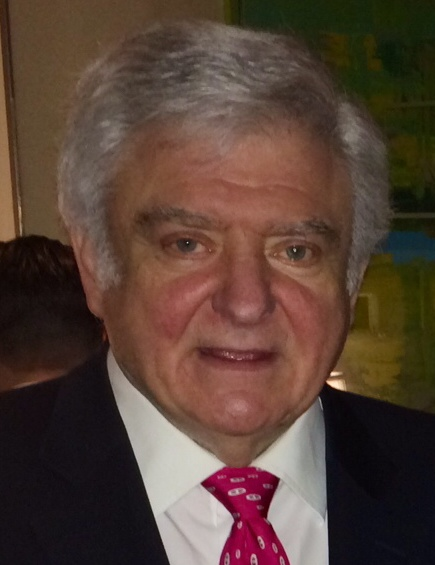
- Greenspan in 2014
- Born: Edward Leonard Greenspan; February 28, 1944; Niagara Falls, Ontario, Canada
- Died: December 24, 2014 (aged 70); Phoenix, Arizona, U.S.
- Education: University College, Toronto; Osgoode Hall Law School
- Occupations: Lawyer, legal author
- Website: greenspanpartners.com

Edward Leonard Greenspan, QC (February 28, 1944 – December 24, 2014) was one of Canada's most famous defence lawyers, and a prolific author of legal volumes. His fame was owed to numerous high-profile clients and to his national exposure on the Canadian Broadcasting Corporation radio series (and later a CBC television series) Scales of Justice (1982–1994).

== Life and career ==
A graduate of University College, Toronto (1965) and Osgoode Hall Law School (1968), Greenspan was called to the Ontario Bar in 1970 and was the senior partner of the Toronto law firm of Greenspan Partners LLP. He was a vice president of the Canadian Civil Liberties Association. He was a member of the Quadrangle Society and a Senior Fellow of Massey College at the University of Toronto. Greenspan became a Queen's Counsel in 1982. In 1991, in Boston, Massachusetts, he was inducted into the American College of Trial Lawyers.

Greenspan's work as a criminal defence lawyer was widely recognized in the form of honorary degrees and medals. In 1999, the Law Society of Upper Canada awarded him an Honorary Doctor of Laws. He was awarded the G. Arthur Martin Medal in 2001. He received a Doctorate of Civil Laws from the University of Windsor in 2002, Assumption University in 2004 and Brock University in 2012. He was awarded the Advocates' Society Medal in 2009 and the highest honour to be bestowed on an Ontario Lawyer, the Law Society Medal.

In December 1983, Greenspan found himself marginally involved in the murder of the gangster Domenic Racco. The gangster Giuseppe Avigone saw Greenspan to ask him to cash the $8,000 cheque that Racco had with him when he was killed, a request that Greenspan refused.

A Canadian of Jewish heritage, Greenspan was a vocal supporter of Israel and related issues. On October 10, 2002, he and fellow Toronto lawyer David C. Nathanson published an opinion piece in the National Post arguing that the Canada Customs and Revenue Agency should recognize the Magen David Adom as a charitable organization.

Greenspan was an outspoken opponent of the death penalty. In 1986, when the House of Commons of Canada was debating a proposal to reinstate capital punishment in Canada, Greenspan suspended his practice for three months in order to tour the country and debate the issue in any forum available. The proposal was ultimately defeated. In 2001, he argued and won a case at the Supreme Court of Canada which barred extradition of people from Canada to face possible capital punishment in other countries.

Greenspan was partners with some of the most accomplished lawyers in Canada. Greenspan's former partners include: Michael Moldaver (Supreme Court of Canada Judge), Marc Rosenberg (Judge of the Ontario Court of Appeal), Marie Henein and Todd B. White. As of 1986, he was reported to have billed $1.1 million for one murder case; when asked to disclose his fee, he suggested the reporter "get charged with a criminal offence, come to my office and I'll be happy to talk to you". Greenspan was an outspoken critic of Prime Minister Stephen Harper's criminal justice legislation, including in a 2012 opinion piece in magazine The Walrus and a 2013 opinion piece in newspaper The Globe and Mail.

He was the subject of a documentary film, A Criminal Mind, directed by Barry Avrich.

== Death ==
Greenspan died of heart failure at the age of 70 while vacationing in Phoenix, Arizona, in December 2014. Greenspan's funeral was held at Beth Torah Synagogue in Toronto with burial at Mount Pleasant Cemetery.

Toronto Mayor John Tory said of Greenspan, "Life as a defence lawyer isn't always easy. Edward Greenspan was a larger than life figure in legal circles, our city and country. He was a brilliant lawyer who understood how important it is that everyone have a defence, and he was a tireless champion for human rights. On top of that he was a great citizen and a wonderful human being. On my own behalf, and on behalf of the people of Toronto, I offer my sincere condolences to his family. He will truly be missed."

The Ontario MPP Jagmeet Singh reflected on Greenspan's career in fighting for "societies marginalized" as being an inspiration.

== Personal and family ==
His brother, Brian Greenspan, is also a Canadian lawyer.

== Clients ==
Among Greenspan's famous clients were:

- Justice Leonard Pace, Nova Scotia Court of Appeal judge, when the Justice was called before a panel of the Canadian Judicial Council
- Roland J. Thornhill, former deputy premier of Nova Scotia: three charges of forgery dismissed, 1991
- Gerald Regan, former premier of Nova Scotia, acquitted on 9 sex-related charges, 1995 1998 trial
- Daniel Bailey, soccer player (acquitted)
- Conrad Black (convicted)
- Helmuth Buxbaum (1984–1985, convicted)
- Peter Demeter, at whose trial Greenspan made his name as junior counsel (convicted)
- Garth Drabinsky, Toronto impresario (client was convicted)
- Marc Stuart Dreier, prominent New York lawyer charged with hedge-funds related fraud in Canada (client went to U.S. voluntarily and was tried there with U.S. counsel)
- Gerard Filion, past editor of Le Devoir and chairman of the Board of Marine Industries, charged with bid rigging (acquitted)
- Robert Latimer, Saskatchewan farmer who killed his disabled daughter (argued appeal in the Supreme Court of Canada)
- Gary Payton, Sam Cassell, with the Milwaukee Bucks, charged with assault causing bodily harm (acquitted)
- P. Reign, rapper charged with gun possession charges in Toronto (client was acquitted)
- Wolodumir "Walter" Stadnick, president of Hells Angels Canada (convicted).
- Karlheinz Schreiber, German financier (extradition matter)
- Stephen Williams, author of a book on Paul Bernardo (acquitted)

== Publications ==
Greenspan published or edited over 25 books, including:

- Greenspan, The Case for the Defence. Autobiography, co-written with George Jonas.
- The Canadian Charter of Rights Canada Law Book, 1982-
- Counsel for the Defence: the Bernard Cohn Memorial Lectures in Criminal Law Irwin Law, 2005.
- The Criminal Procedure and Practice. Toronto: Osgoode Hall Law School, York University, 1976- (many later editions).
- The Dubin Lectures on Advocacy, 1998-2002. Canada Law Book, 2004.
- Martin's Annual Criminal Code. Toronto: Canada Law Book, [1955] (editor since 1978)
- Martin's Related Statutes (editor since 1980)
- Perspectives in Criminal Law: Essays in Honour of John L. J. Edwards, edited by Anthony N. Doob and Edward L. Greenspan. Canada Law Book, 1985.

== Books ==
- Schneider, Stephen (2009). Iced: The Story of Organized Crime in Canada (2nd ed.). Toronto: John Wiley & Sons. ISBN 978-0470835005.
