= Alexander Brothers (American musicians) =

American pop music duo

The Alexander Brothers were an American pop music duo who achieved minor success as Mercury Records artists in the early 1950s. Their recording of "Goodnight Irene" charted briefly in September 1950. "Goodnight Irene" was recorded in 1950 as part of a four-song session which included the song Mona Lisa which received notice from trade publications. Later that year they provided vocals in a session by Mr. Goon-Bones & Barney Lantz. Another four-song session for the Alexander Brothers was produced in 1951.
