= Moxy Früvous =

Canadian comedic folk rock band

- Moxy Früvous, 1993 (left to right: Dave Matheson, Jian Ghomeshi, Murray Foster, Mike Ford)

Background information
- Origin: Thornhill, Ontario, Canada
- Genres: Folk rock, comedy rock, soft rock
- Years active: 1989–2001
- Labels: Warner Music Canada, Bottom Line, Atlantic, True North Records
- Members: Jian Ghomeshi; Murray Foster; Mike Ford; Dave Matheson
- Website: fruvous.com

Moxy Früvous was a Canadian politically satirical folk-pop band from Thornhill, Ontario, Canada. The band was founded in 1989, and was active until 2001. Common themes in Früvous songs include Canada and the "human experience."

== History ==
The band formed in 1989 when Jian Ghomeshi (then going by Jean Ghomeshi), Murray Foster and Mike Ford, former classmates at the local Thornlea Secondary School and playing in a pub band called The Chia Pets at the time, joined with David Matheson to busk in Toronto. Their regular spot was outside the Bloor Cinema, where they performed "three complete sets every Friday night."

The quartet drew crowds, and, eventually, the attention of Toronto-based CBC Radio, which commissioned songs about political and local issues for the radio show Later the Same Day. Some songs written for the show later appeared on their albums; these songs include "Gulf War Song" and "My Baby Loves a Bunch of Authors," which was written for the Toronto International Festival of Authors in November 1991.

The band released a self-titled six-song demo tape in 1992, and that year performed at the SOCAN Awards celebration. The band's success led to a bidding war and the band signing with Warner Music Canada. The demo sold over 50,000 units and was certified Gold in Canada in 1993. Their first major-label album, Bargainville, was released the same year. Bargainville was also successful, and was certified Platinum in Canada in 1994. That same year, the band was nominated for the Juno Award for Group of the Year.

In the beginning, Ford and Matheson were "the Lennon and McCartney writing duo." Foster and Ghomeshi gradually became part of the songwriting process as well.

On August 14, 1997, their song "You Will Go to the Moon" was used by NASA to wake the crew of STS-85.

The band sometimes sang with little or no accompaniment in a style similar to contemporary a cappella. A number of their songs also express the band's progressive political leanings ("The Greatest Man in America", for instance, mocks Rush Limbaugh, and "Big Fish" lambastes former Premier of Ontario Mike Harris). Früvous was also known for their close relationship with their fans and their live shows, which were full of political commentary, humorous banter, and musical improvisation.

On July 27, 1999, the band released Thornhill. The album was released by True North Records. "Sad Girl" was released as a single from the album and was accompanied by a music video.

The band gave its last concert in 2000 (excepting a performance at an annual fan convention in 2001).

=== Post-breakup activity ===
On September 5, 2005, Ford, Foster and Ghomeshi performed on CIUT, the U of T's campus radio station, as part of the morning program Toronto Unlocked, an ad hoc program produced and hosted by locked-out CBC Radio One staff.

The last update to the band's website occurred on September 26, 2018. The website was replaced by a default webserver page in mid-2009. The page eventually returned, and as of October 2026 is still available.

Ghomeshi, Foster, and Ford performed on CBC Radio One on March 1, 2010, as a goodbye to Metro Morning host Andy Barrie.

In late 2014, Ghomeshi was arrested and charged with four counts of sexual assault, and one count of choking, in relation to three complainants. He was charged with three additional counts related to three more women on January 8, 2015.

On October 31, 2014, Murray Foster posted an "official response from the other former Moxy Fruvous members":

"As former colleagues of Jian (our last show was in 2000), we are sickened and saddened by this week's news. We had no inkling that Jian engaged in this type of behaviour. We abhor the idea of a sexual relationship of any sort being entered into without full consent from both parties and condemn violence against women in any form. We wish only health and healing to everyone involved. We have no further comment on this matter at this time."

Ghomeshi was acquitted of five assault charges on March 24, 2016. On May 11, 2016, the Crown withdrew the last remaining charge after Ghomeshi signed a peace bond and apologized to the plaintiff.

== Later projects ==
- Jian Ghomeshi worked for CBC Radio One, primarily as the host of the arts and cultural program Q until October 2014, when he was fired. He also wrote a book, 1982, published by Penguin Books.
- Murray Foster is part of the band Great Atomic Power, with Dave Matheson, Tory Cassis, Mark Mariash and Jason LaPrade. He also performs in a vocal jazz standard group called The Lesters. Most recently, Foster toured as part of Great Big Sea, replacing bass player and singer Darrell Power.
- Dave Matheson performs solo and with Murray Foster in Great Atomic Power.
- Mike Ford often performs in schools, singing his songs about the history of Canada.
- Murray Foster and Mike Ford formed The Cocksure Lads in 2011. They have released two albums and have performed live in the Toronto area. Dave Matheson also makes occasional appearances with The Cocksure Lads.

== Album discography ==
- Moxy Früvous (1992, demo, rare)
- Bargainville (1993)
  - includes the single "King of Spain"
- Wood (1995)
- The 'b' Album (1996, b-sides and other oddities)
- You Will Go to the Moon (1997)
- Live Noise (1998, live)
- Thornhill (1999)
- The 'c' Album (2000, b-sides and other oddities)
