= Marc Rosenberg (judge) =

Canadian judge (1950–2015)

The Honourable Marc Rosenberg

Justice of the Court of Appeal for Ontario
- In office December 12, 1995 – March 5, 2014
- Succeeded by: Grant Huscroft

Personal details
- Born: January 4, 1950 North York, Ontario
- Died: August 27, 2015 (aged 65) Toronto, Ontario
- Cause of death: Brain tumour
- Resting place: Pardes Shalom Cemetery, Maple, Ontario
- Spouse: Martha Rosenberg (m. 1971; died 2012)
- Domestic partner: Priscilla Platt
- Children: 2
- Education: University of Western Ontario; Osgoode Hall Law School

Marc Rosenberg (January 4, 1950 – August 27, 2015) was a Canadian lawyer and jurist who served as a justice of the Court of Appeal for Ontario from December 12, 1995 to March 5, 2014.

Born in North York, Ontario, Rosenberg graduated from the University of Western Ontario in 1971, and earned an L.L.B. from Osgoode Hall Law School in 1974. He participated in a criminal law practice with Edward Greenspan until 1995, when he joined the Ministry of the Attorney General of Ontario as Assistant Deputy Attorney General, Public Law and Policy Division and Civil Law Division. Rosenberg was appointed to the Court of Appeal for Ontario in 1995 and authored over 2,500 judgements. During that time he was noted for significant contributes in international judicial education. He was diagnosed with brain cancer in 2014 and died in 2015.

== Legal positions ==
Some of Justice Rosenberg's positions and academic contributions include:

- The positive impact of the Charter of Rights and Freedoms on Canadian criminal law
- Similar fact evidence in criminal law
- The possibility of eliminating plea bargains
- Arguing the justice system had fallen into a state of disrepair due in part to mandatory minimum sentences

== Notable cases ==
Justice Rosenberg authored decisions on:

- Medical marijuana
- Overturning the conviction of Stephen Truscott

== Awards ==
- G. Arthur Martin medal for outstanding contribution to criminal justice, 2009
