= You Will Go to the Moon =

Studio album by Moxy Früvous
- Released: March 18, 1997 (United States); April 29, 1997 (Canada)
- Genre: Folk, pop
- Length: 41:48
- Label: Bottom Line Records, Warner Music Canada
- Producer: Moxy Früvous, Stephen Traub

Moxy Früvous chronology
The 'b' Album (1995)	You Will Go to the Moon (1997)	Live Noise (1998)

Professional ratings
Review scores
Source	Rating
AllMusic	4.5/5 stars

You Will Go to the Moon is the third album by the Canadian folk band Moxy Früvous, released in 1997. The title track was inspired by the children's book. "I've Gotta Get A Message To You" is a cover of the Bee Gees song.

== Critical reception ==
Stereo Review wrote: "Right from the start, these Canadians show their debt to eclectic pop (read: XTC), and it all sounds a little too calculating and tied up in ribbons. But it's hard to resist the plentiful melodies, harmonies, exotics, and jokes." The Toronto Star praised the "clever wordsmithery, spot-the-pop-reference tomfoolery, stylistic swings and, of course, close vocal harmonies."

== Track listing ==
1. "Michigan Militia" - 3:18
2. "Get In The Car" - 2:36
3. "I've Gotta Get A Message To You" (by the Bee Gees) - 3:58
4. "Lazlo's Career" - 4:13
5. "Sahara" - 3:50
6. "Lee" - 3:37
7. "No No Raja" - 2:57
8. "The Incredible Medicine Show" - 3:48
9. "Your New Boyfriend" - 2:04
10. "Kick In The Ass" - 2:18
11. "Boo Time" - 2:25
12. "Love Set Fire" - 4:25
13. "You Will Go To The Moon" - 2:12
