= 1982 (book) =

2012 book by Jian Ghomeshi

- Author: Jian Ghomeshi
- Subject: Memoir
- Publisher: Viking Canada
- Publication date: 2012
- Pages: 304

1982 is a memoir written by Canadian radio personality Jian Ghomeshi. Describing a year in Ghomeshi's teenage life as an Iranian-Canadian, the book received mixed reviews.

== Content ==
1982 is a memoir of Ghomeshi's life at the age of 14 (during 1982) growing up as an Iranian-Canadian in Thornhill, Ontario (a suburb of Toronto), his attempt to fit in as one of the few non-white kids in his neighbourhood, and his goal of mimicking his idol David Bowie. During this time Ghomeshi ensured his clothes smelled of cigarette smoke (despite being a non-smoker, it would give him "social credibility"), dressed "new wave" and listened to music from David Bowie, Talking Heads, and Rush.

== Reception ==
1982 received mixed reception from critics. Zoe Whittall provided a "Short list" (of which are used frequently in 1982) of what she liked about the book, including the use of song titles as chapter headings (which would prompt the reader to download the song), and Ghomeshi's "use of 'Bowie' as both a proper noun and adjective." Whittall called it a "funny, nostalgic and compelling read, especially for music nerds of a certain age." Stephen Carlick criticized the book, saying that Ghomeshi's attempt to appeal to the varied audience that listens to his CBC Radio program Q made it "uneven and often tedious" to read, making the reader question who the book was for after the prologue which Carlick referred to as "1982 for Dummies".

== Sequel ==
Ghomeshi wrote a sequel but, due to allegations of sexual violence, in October 2014 his publisher, Penguin Books, announced that it would not publish it.
