= Lookbook =

Collection of fashion photographs

A lookbook is a collection of photographs compiled to show off a model, photographer, style, stylist, or clothing line. Usually, bloggers or vloggers will "model" fashionable looks for that month or season. This gives viewers ideas on how to style outfits, or to show what the latest fashions are. It is an especially popular term among "fashion bloggers".

Lookbooks in their online form can be described as "fashion diaries" because bloggers are constantly updating them on a daily or weekly basis. However, sometimes they are made to compile the looks of other people such as a celebrity, politicians or socialites. They can also be used as an artist's portfolio.

== Cinematography ==
While the lookbook term has become more prevalent in recent years through fashion vloggers, lookbooks have long been associated with cinematography. Whereas a fashion lookbook has more in common with a portfolio, cinematography lookbooks will contain a collection of reference images illustrating scene layout, setting, and lighting. This may be used by a cinematographer to show a director how to illustrate or communicate the intended result of a scene, or vice versa, when the director has something particular in mind.
