= Mike Ford (musician) =

Canadian singer-songwriter

- Born: Michael John Ford
- Genres: Folk, rock
- Occupations: singer-songwriter, teacher
- Instruments: Guitar, vocals

Michael John Ford is a Canadian singer-songwriter, and a former member of Toronto band Moxy Früvous.

== Solo career ==
In 2004, Ford released Stars Shone on Toronto, his first solo album. Canada Needs You, his second solo album, was released in 2005, and was nominated for a Juno Award in Canada. It is an album that focuses on Canadian history, ranging from the earliest European contacts with First Nations to the settlement of the Prairie provinces.

Ford's third album, Satellite Hot Stove, an eight-song follow-up to Stars Shone on Toronto, was released in 2007.

Canada Needs You Volume Two, the follow-up to the 2005 album, was released in June 2008. The sequel focused on events in Canadian history from World War I to the protests at Clayoquot Sound.

Ford regularly tours schools across Ontario performing his curriculum-focused compositions about Canada in lively and interactive concerts. He has also made stops across Ontario to work with students in the creation of their own songs about the environment, community and identity.

He has appeared on many recordings including albums by The Klezmatics, Barenaked Ladies, David Francey, and The Arrogant Worms. Since around 2006, Mike Ford has been performing at a summer camp called Camp Kodiak.

== The Cocksure Lads ==
Ford and fellow Moxy Früvous member Murray Foster also perform as The Cocksure Lads, a faux-1960s British Invasion-style band. They've released two Cocksure Lads albums: The Greatest Hits of the Cocksure Lads: 1963–1968 in 2010, and MAD LAD PLAN in 2014. A movie about the fictional history of the band was released in 2015, and from 2016-2019 Ford & Foster workshopped a related full-length musical ("Chelsea Sunrise") with Theatre Sheridan.

Ford has since created three history-based plays for Guelph Museums that have toured Europe, and has been Artist in Residence for Toronto Public Libraries (2017) and Toronto History Museums (2018). When not doing all the above, Ford teaches Middle School French Immersion in Toronto.
