= Peace bond =

Good behaviour order (Canadian law)

In Canadian law, a peace bond (also known as a 810 order, after the relevant section of the Criminal Code of Canada) is an order from a criminal court that requires a person to keep the peace and be on good behaviour for a period of time. This essentially means that the person who signs a peace bond must not be charged with any additional criminal offences during its duration. Peace bonds often have other conditions as well, such as not having any weapons or staying away from a particular person or place. Peace bonds are similar to a civil court restraining order, and are also based on the lesser burden of proof of civil law.

A peace bond can be issued by a criminal court judge or a Justice of the Peace. A peace bond is usually issued when the Crown Prosecutor is convinced that a strong case does not exist against the accused. A person does not plead guilty when they enter into a peace bond. Thus, there is no finding of guilt or conviction registered if a person agrees to sign a peace bond. One of the reasons why a person may agree to enter into a peace bond is to avoid a criminal trial, and ultimately the possibility of being convicted in a court of law of the offence for which they were charged. Being convicted in a court of law would entail receiving a criminal record.

The peace bond itself is usually set for twelve months. If a peace bond is signed, then the charges are withdrawn, and the prosecution of those charges is considered to be complete, and those same charges can never be re-instated. However, if one or more of the conditions of a peace bond are broken, either by not obeying one of the conditions, or by getting charged with a subsequent criminal offence within the 12-month period of time in which it was signed, there could be very serious repercussions, as this may result in the person being charged with a separate criminal offence of "breach of recognizance" or "disobeying a court order". The defendant may also be required to forfeit the entire cash surety that they pledged to pay to the court (usually $500 or $1000) when they entered into the peace bond. Breaching any condition of a peace bond is considered a criminal offence. Moreover, as of July 19, 2015, a conviction for breaching a condition of a peace bond carries a maximum sentence of up to four years imprisonment.

In exceptional cases, an expired peace bond may still be disclosed by the police if the person once subject to the bond is seeking a very detailed criminal history check (vulnerable sector search) in order to work or volunteer directly without supervision with children, seniors, or disabled individuals. Although there are no uniform standards across the country, after a five-year period has elapsed from the date that the peace bond was issued, and if the person subject to the peace bond has not since transgressed the law, it should no longer appear even in the most detailed type of criminal record check.

== United States ==
Peace bonds, or "sureties for good behavior", appear to have been in common use in the early history of the United States. Many states still retain statutes that provide for the issuance of peace bonds, but they are infrequently invoked. The constitutionality of existing peace bond statutes is questionable.

== See also ==
- Bail (Canada)
- Binding over
- Parole
- Probation
- Anti-social behaviour order (UK)
- Deferred prosecution (US)
- Restraining order (US)
