= Anywhere I Wander =

Single by Danny Kaye

from the album Hans Christian Andersen
- A-side: "Wonderful Copenhagen"
- Published: 1951
- Songwriter: Frank Loesser

"Anywhere I Wander" is a popular song written by Frank Loesser. The song was published in 1951 and introduced by Danny Kaye in the 1952 musical film, Hans Christian Andersen.

The best-known recording, by Julius La Rosa, was released by Cadence Records as catalog number 1230. It first reached the Billboard charts on January 31, 1953, and lasted nine weeks on the chart, peaking at No. 4. It was Cadence's first single, and also La Rosa's first recording. The catalog number, 1230, is derived from La Rosa's birthday, January 2, 1930.

== Other recordings ==
- Mel Torme's recording for Capitol Records charted briefly in November 1952 in the No. 30 spot.
- Hugo Winterhalter's Orchestra and Chorus recorded it at Manhattan Center, New York City, on November 26, 1952. It was released by RCA Victor Records as catalog number 20-5124 (in US) and by EMI on the His Master's Voice label as catalog number B 10437.
- Tony Bennett - a single release in 1952 for Columbia Records (catalog No. 39866).
- Joni James included the song in her album Songs by Victor Young and Songs by Frank Loesser (1956).
- Saxophonist David Sanborn covered the song on his 1978 album Heart to Heart.
