= List of Billboard number-one albums of 1953 =

These are the Billboard magazine number-one albums of 1953, per the Billboard 200.

No chart was issued from August 29 to December 19.

== Chart history through August 22 ==
Chart history
Issue date	33 1/3 R.P.M.			45 R.P.M.			Ref.
Issue date	Album	Artist(s)	Label	Album	Artist(s)	Label	Ref.
January 3	1937–'38 Jazz Concert No. 2	Benny Goodman	Columbia	Christmas with Eddie Fisher	Eddie Fisher	RCA Victor	
January 10	1937–'38 Jazz Concert No. 2	Benny Goodman	Columbia	I'm in the Mood for Love	Eddie Fisher	RCA Victor	
January 17	1937–'38 Jazz Concert No. 2	Benny Goodman	Columbia	I'm in the Mood for Love	Eddie Fisher	RCA Victor	
January 24	1937–'38 Jazz Concert No. 2	Benny Goodman	Columbia	I'm in the Mood for Love	Eddie Fisher	RCA Victor	
January 31	1937–'38 Jazz Concert No. 2	Benny Goodman	Columbia	I'm in the Mood for Love	Eddie Fisher	RCA Victor	
February 7	1937–'38 Jazz Concert No. 2	Benny Goodman	Columbia	I'm in the Mood for Love	Eddie Fisher	RCA Victor	
February 14	Hans Christian Andersen	Danny Kaye	Decca	I'm in the Mood for Love	Eddie Fisher	RCA Victor	
February 21	Hans Christian Andersen	Danny Kaye	Decca	Stars and Stripes Forever	Soundtrack	MGM	
February 28	Hans Christian Andersen	Danny Kaye	Decca	Hans Christian Andersen	Danny Kaye	Decca	
March 7	Hans Christian Andersen	Danny Kaye	Decca	Stars and Stripes Forever	Soundtrack	MGM	
March 14	Hans Christian Andersen	Danny Kaye	Decca	Hans Christian Andersen	Danny Kaye	Decca	
March 21	Hans Christian Andersen	Danny Kaye	Decca	Hans Christian Andersen	Danny Kaye	Decca	
March 28	Hans Christian Andersen	Danny Kaye	Decca	Hans Christian Andersen	Danny Kaye	Decca	
April 4	Hans Christian Andersen	Danny Kaye	Decca	Music for Lovers Only	Jackie Gleason	Capitol	
April 11	Hans Christian Andersen	Danny Kaye	Decca	Music for Lovers Only	Jackie Gleason	Capitol	
April 18	Hans Christian Andersen	Danny Kaye	Decca	Arthur Godfrey's TV Calendar Show	Arthur Godfrey	Columbia	
April 25	Hans Christian Andersen	Danny Kaye	Decca	Hans Christian Andersen	Danny Kaye	Decca	
May 2	Hans Christian Andersen	Danny Kaye	Decca	Hans Christian Andersen	Danny Kaye	Decca	
May 9	Hans Christian Andersen	Danny Kaye	Decca	Hans Christian Andersen	Danny Kaye	Decca	
May 16	Hans Christian Andersen	Danny Kaye	Decca	Hans Christian Andersen	Danny Kaye	Decca	
May 23	Hans Christian Andersen	Danny Kaye	Decca	Hans Christian Andersen	Danny Kaye	Decca	
May 30	Music for Lovers Only	Jackie Gleason	Capitol	Music for Lovers Only	Jackie Gleason	Capitol	
June 6	The Music of Victor Herbert	Mantovani	London	Hans Christian Andersen	Danny Kaye	Decca	
June 13	Music for Lovers Only	Jackie Gleason	Capitol	Music for Lovers Only	Jackie Gleason	Capitol	
June 20	Hans Christian Andersen	Danny Kaye	Decca	Music for Lovers Only	Jackie Gleason	Capitol	
June 27	Hans Christian Andersen	Danny Kaye	Decca	Music for Lovers Only	Jackie Gleason	Capitol	
July 4	Music for Lovers Only	Jackie Gleason	Capitol	Music for Lovers Only	Jackie Gleason	Capitol	
July 11	Music for Lovers Only	Jackie Gleason	Capitol	Music for Lovers Only	Jackie Gleason	Capitol	
July 18	Music for Lovers Only	Jackie Gleason	Capitol	Music for Lovers Only	Jackie Gleason	Capitol	
July 25	Music for Lovers Only	Jackie Gleason	Capitol	Music for Lovers Only	Jackie Gleason	Capitol	
August 1	Music for Lovers Only	Jackie Gleason	Capitol	Music for Lovers Only	Jackie Gleason	Capitol	
August 8	Music for Lovers Only	Jackie Gleason	Capitol	Music for Lovers Only	Jackie Gleason	Capitol	
August 15	Music for Lovers Only	Jackie Gleason	Capitol	Music for Lovers Only	Jackie Gleason	Capitol	
August 22	Music for Lovers Only	Jackie Gleason	Capitol	Music for Lovers Only	Jackie Gleason	Capitol	

== Chart history December 26 ==
Issue date	Album	Artist(s)	Label	Ref.
December 26	Christmas with Arthur Godfrey	Arthur Godfrey	Columbia	

== See also ==
- 1953 in music
- List of number-one albums (United States)
