= Arthur Godfrey's TV Calendar Show =

Studio album by Arthur Godfrey & his friends
- Released: 1953
- Label: Columbia

Arthur Godfrey's TV Calendar Show is an album containing original song material written and composed by Joan Edwards and Lyn Duddy for the Columbia Broadcasting System (CBS) television show Arthur Godfrey and His Friends, namely for its segment titled "The Calendar Show".

The album was released by Columbia Records in the spring of 1953.

== Background and release ==
The album was adapted from a segment titled "The Calendar Show" presented on Arthur Godfrey's television show Arthur Godfrey and His Friends on January 28, 1953, to an immediate positive reaction. Billboard discussed the album's release in the March 21 issue under the headline "Godfrey TV hit is ditto for disks", writing that "CBS decided to put [the segment] on wax" after rerunning it [in February], which was already "a very unusial procedure for a TV show". "This show set, with its double TV exposure, looks like a strong seller [...] and should move a lot of copies between now and Easter. The firm intends to hand it an all-out promotional push," wrote Bob Rolontz in the aforementioned Billboard news article.

The album was issued on all three speeds: on a 12-inch 33⅓-rpm LP (cat. no. GL 521), as a 45-rpm record set (cat. no. G 4-18), and as a 78-rpm record set (cat. no. G18).

== Chart performance ==
The album spent one week at No. 1 on the 45 R.P.M. half of Billboard's Best-Selling Popular Albums chart in mid-April 1953.

== Track listing ==
12-inch LP (Columbia GL 521)

Side 1
No.	Title	Artist(s)	Length
1.	"(January) Look Ahead"	The Mariners
2.	"(February) I'm in Love Again"	Marion Marlowe
3.	"(March) It's the Irish in Me"	Frank Parker
4.	"(April) Easter in Waikiki"	Haleloke
5.	"(May) If It Wasn't for Your Father"	Arthur Godfrey & The Chordettes
6.	"(June) Everything That's Yours Is Mine"	Janette Davis & Julius La Rosa

Side 2
No.	Title	Artist(s)	Length
1.	"(July) Rockaway Beach"	Lu Ann Simms
2.	"(August) Summer's Symphony"	Julius La Rosa
3.	"(September) It's Autumn Again"	Marion Marlowe & Frank Parker
4.	"(October) Give a Cheer"	Janette Davis
5.	"(November) Appreciation"	Arthur Godfrey
6.	"(December) The First Snow of Winter"	Arthur Godfrey
7.	"(The New Year) Look Ahead"	Arthur Godfrey

== Charts ==
Chart (1953)	Peak position
US Billboard Best Selling Popular Albums – 33⅓ R.P.M.	2
US Billboard Best Selling Popular Albums – 45 R.P.M.	1

== See also ==
- List of Billboard number-one albums of 1953
