= Arthur Godfrey and His Friends =

American variety show (1948–1957; 1958–1959)

- Genre: Variety show
- Directed by: John Paul Nickell
- Starring: Arthur Godfrey
- Country of origin: United States
- Original language: English
- No. of seasons: 10

Production
- Running time: 48–50 minutes

Original release
- Network: CBS Television
- Release: January 12, 1949 – April 28, 1959

Arthur Godfrey and His Friends is an American television variety show hosted by Arthur Godfrey. The hour-long series aired on CBS Television from January 12, 1949, to June 1957 (as The Arthur Godfrey Show after September 1956), then again as a half-hour show from September 1958 to April 1959.

Many of Godfrey's musical acts were culled from Arthur Godfrey's Talent Scouts, which was airing on CBS at the same time. The singers included Frank Parker, Marion Marlowe, Janette Davis, Julius La Rosa, The Mariners, The McGuire Sisters, Carmel Quinn, Pat Boone, Lu Ann Simms, and The Chordettes. The show was live, and Godfrey often did away with the script and improvised. In addition, unlike his morning show Arthur Godfrey Time, the evening show often presented celebrity guests. He refused to participate in commercials for products he did not believe in.

The series was a hit in the Nielsen ratings in the early to mid 1950s, often finishing just behind Arthur Godfrey's Talent Scouts. It ranked #18 in the 1950–1951 season, #6 in 1951–1952, #3 in 1952–1953, #6 in 1953-1954 and #22 in 1954–1955. Arthur Godfrey and His Friends also earned a nomination for an Emmy Award in 1953 for Best Variety Program.

Sponsors included Viva lipstick and Liggett & Myers Tobacco Company.

== See also ==
- Arthur Godfrey's TV Calendar Show
