= Hans Christian Andersen (Danny Kaye album) =

Studio album by Danny Kaye
- Released: 1952
- Label: Decca

Danny Kaye Sings Selections from the Samuel Goldwyn Technicolor Production Hans Christian Andersen, or simply Hans Christian Andersen, is an album by Danny Kaye featuring songs written by Frank Loesser for the 1952 RKO musical film Hans Christian Andersen.

== Release ==
The album was originally issued by Decca Records on a 10-inch LP (cat. no. DL 5433).

== Chart performance ==
The album reached No. 1 on both the 33⅓ R.P.M. and 45 R.P.M. halves of Billboard's Best Selling Popular Albums chart.

== Track listing ==
10-inch LP (Decca DL 5433)

All tracks are written by Frank Loesser.

Side 1
No.	Title	Artist(s)	Length
1.	"I'm Hans Christian Andersen"	Danny Kaye	2:33
2.	"Anywhere I Wander"	Danny Kaye	3:11
3.	"The Ugly Duckling"	Danny Kaye	3:02
4.	"Inchworm"	Danny Kaye	3:09

Side 2
No.	Title	Artist(s)	Length
1.	"Thumbalina"	Danny Kaye	1:44
2.	"No Two People"	Danny Kaye and Jane Wyman	2:20
3.	"The King's New Clothes"	Danny Kaye	3:29
4.	"Wonderful Copenhagen"	Danny Kaye	2:02

== Personnel ==
- Danny Kaye accompanied by Gordon Jenkins and his orchestra and chorus and Jane Wyman

== Charts ==
Chart (1953)	Peak position
US Billboard Best-Selling Children's Records	1
US Billboard Best Selling Popular Albums – 33⅓ R.P.M.	1
US Billboard Best Selling Popular Albums – 45 R.P.M.	1

== See also ==
- List of Billboard number-one albums of 1953
