= Stars and Stripes Forever (soundtrack) =

1952 soundtrack conducted by Alfred Newman

Soundtrack album by Twentieth Century-Fox Studio Orchestra conducted by Alfred Newman
- Released: 1952
- Label: MGM

The original soundtrack to the 1952 motion picture Stars and Stripes Forever was released by MGM Records in the same year. All the pieces are performed by the Twentieth Century-Fox Studio Orchestra conducted by Alfred Newman.

== Release ==
The album was originally issued on a 10-inch LP (cat. no. E-176).

== Critical reception ==
Professional ratings
Review scores
| Source | Rating |
|---|---|
| Film News | (favorable) |
| Audio-visual Guide | (favorable) |

The Film News magazine called the album a "rousing collection" of marches.

Ben Deutschman wrote in his review published in Audio-visual Guide, Film and Radio Discussion Guide, and Catholic Music Educators Bulletin: "I had the pleasure of hearing the original Sousa's Band many times and also met and made an early hero of the great march king. Many times [...] it was felt that when Sousa's Band played one was not hearing just music but rather an expression of the many facets of growth that one found in the common people of this growing nation. Alfred Newman has somehow recaptured this feeling in the music in this album."

== Chart performance ==
The album reached No. 1 on the 45 R.P.M. half of Billboard's Best Selling Popular Albums chart.

== Track listing ==
10-inch LP (MGM E-176)

Side 1
| No. | Title | Music | Length |
|---|---|---|---|
| 1. | "Stars and Stripes Forever" | John Philip Sousa |
| 2. | "Light Cavalry Overture" | Franz von Suppé |
| 3. | "Turkey in the Straw" |
| 4. | "Washington Post March" | John Philip Sousa |

Side 2
| No. | Title | Lyrics | Music | Length |
|---|---|---|---|---|
| 1. | "Semper Fidelis" | | John Philip Sousa |
| 2. | "El Capitan" | | John Philip Sousa |
| 3. | "Hail to the Chief" | Walter Scott | James Sanderson |
| 4. | "Dixie" | | Dan Emmett |
| 5. | "Battle Hymn of the Republic" | Julia Ward Howe | William Steffe |

== Charts ==
| Chart (1953) | Peak position |
|---|---|
| US Billboard Best Selling Popular Albums – 45 R.P.M. | 1 |

== Personnel ==
- Twentieth Century-Fox Studio Orchestra conducted by Alfred Newman

== See also ==
- List of Billboard number-one albums of 1953
