= Christmas with Arthur Godfrey =

Christmas with Arthur Godfrey and All the Little Godfreys

Studio album by Arthur Godfrey with all the little Godfreys
- Released: 1953
- Label: Columbia

Christmas with Arthur Godfrey and All the Little Godfreys, or simply Christmas with Arthur Godfrey, is an album released by Columbia Records in 1953.

== Release ==
The album was "available on all three speeds": on 33⅓ (as a 12-inch LP; cat. no. CL 540), on 45 (as a 45-rpm record set; cat. no. B-348), and on 78 (as a 78-rpm record set; cat. no. C-348).

== Chart performance ==
The album spent one week at No. 1 on Billboard's Best-Selling Popular LPs chart.

== Track listing ==
12-inch LP (Columbia CL 540)

Side 1
No.	Title	Writer(s)	Artist(s)	Length
1.	"White Christmas"	Berlin	All The Little Godfreys, Arthur Godfrey	3:07
2.	"Santa Claus Is Comin' to Town"	Gillespie, Coots		2:16
3.	"The Christmas Song (Merry Christmas to You)"	Torme, R. Wells	Julius La Rosa	3:15
4.	"Rudolph, the Red-nosed Reindeer"	J. Marks	Mariners	2:19
5.	"Mele Kalikimaka"	Anderson	Haleloke Kahauolopua	1:40
6.	"Winter Wonderland"	Smith, Bernard	Janette Davis	1:38
7.	"Frosty, the Snowman"	J. Rollins, S. Nelson	The McGuire Sisters	1:40
8.	"God Rest Ye Merry, Gentlemen" / "Deck the Halls with Boughs of Holly"	Traditional	The Mariners	2:34
9.	"Here Comes Santa Claus (Down Santa Claus Lane)"	Lu Ann Simms	Autry, Melka, Haldeman	1:41
10.	"Jingle Bells"	Pierpont	A. Godfrey	2:36

Side 2
No.	Title	Writer(s)	Artist(s)	Length
1.	"Adeste Fidelis (O Come, All Ye Faithful)"		Arthur Godfrey	3:38
2.	"Silent Night, Holy Night"	Gruber, Mohr	Marion Marlowe	2:37
3.	"The First Noel" (Traditional)		Arthur Godfrey	4:52
4.	"It Came Upon A Midnight Clear"	R. H. Willis	Frank Parker, Marion Marlowe	2:41
5.	"Away in a Manger (Luther's Carol)"	Spilman	Arthur Godfrey	1:41
6.	"O Holy Night"	Adam	Frank Parker	2:29
7.	"O Little Town Of Bethlehem"	Redner, Brooks	Frank Parker, Marion Marlowe	2:01
8.	"Hark! The Herald Angels Sing"	Wesley, Mendelssohn	Arthur Godfrey	2:59

== Charts ==
Chart (1953)	Peak position
US Billboard Best-Selling Popular LPs	1

== See also ==
- List of Billboard number-one albums of 1953
