= Inchworm (song) =

Song from the film Hans Christian Andersen

Song by Danny Kaye

from the album Hans Christian Andersen
- Released: 1953
- Songwriter: Frank Loesser

"Inchworm", also known as "The Inch Worm", is a song originally performed by Danny Kaye in the 1952 film Hans Christian Andersen. It was written by Frank Loesser.

== Lyrics ==
The song's lyrics express a carpe diem sentiment, with the singer noting that the inchworm of the title has a "business-like mind", and is blind to the beauty of the flowers it encounters:

Two and two are four
Four and four are eight
That's all you have on your business-like mind
Two and two are four
Four and four are eight
How can you be so blind?

Subsequent verses include the lines "Measuring the marigolds, you and your arithmetic / You'll probably go far" and "Seems to me you'd stop and see / How beautiful they are".

Loesser wrote a counterpoint chorus that, sung by itself, has become popular as a children's song because of its arithmetical chorus:

Two and two are four
Four and four are eight
Eight and eight are sixteen
Sixteen and sixteen are thirty-two

In the film, a children's chorus sings the contrapuntal "arithmetic" section over and over inside a small classroom, dolefully and by rote, while Andersen, listening just outside, gazes at an inchworm crawling on the flowers and sings the main section of the song. Loesser loved the intellectual challenge of such contrapuntal composition, which he also did in other works such as Tallahassee.

== Reception ==
The composer received a fan letter (signed pseudonymously, "Respectfully, a Kansas inchworm") which said of the song:

...It is simple, yet it is so intricate, the harmony is perfect and the counterpoint — well it just gives me a headache when I think of what it would be like to try to write it...

Loesser was so touched by the letter that he placed a large advertisement in the largest newspaper in Lawrence, Kansas — the Daily Journal World — in thanks. His correspondent wrote again, revealing herself to be teacher Emily Preyer.

== Recorded versions ==
"Inchworm" has been recorded by many singers, including Paul McCartney, Rachelle Ferrell, The Brothers Creeggan, Anne Murray, Kenny Loggins, We Five, John Lithgow, Mary Hopkin, Doris Day, Dan Zanes, Kurt Wagner, Lisa Loeb, The Sandpipers, and Patricia Barber. Performed instrumentally, it was a regular feature of the John Coltrane Quartet's repertoire and appears on the album Coltrane.

David Bowie said the song was the inspiration behind his 1980 song "Ashes to Ashes":

Ashes To Ashes wouldn't have happened if it hadn't have been for Inchworm. There's a nursery rhyme element in it, and there's something so sad and mournful and poignant about it. It kept bringing me back to the feelings of those pure thoughts of sadness that you have as a child, and how they're so identifiable even when you're an adult.

== Use in film and television ==
- The 1954 Looney Tunes cartoon "From A to Z-Z-Z-Z" opens with a classroom of children reciting the verbatim arithmetic lesson in the same cadence.
- A recording of Danny Kaye singing it was used as the underscoring for a shadow puppet segment on the Captain Kangaroo television show.
- Was sung in part by Principal Skinner in The Simpsons episode S2:E14 "Principal Charming".
- Inchworm has been performed in skits on Jim Henson's Sesame Street and The Muppet Show; the song was done twice by Charles Aznavour, once in a regular sketch, and then again with Danny Kaye and the Muppets when he was on the show.
- The song was performed on the American children's television show Curiosity Shop (ABC).
- In the television series Quantum Leap episode Another Mother, Al (Dean Stockwell) sang it as a lullaby.
- It was used in a 1995 episode of the UK television programme BBC Horizons entitled "Nanotopia", during a segment explaining the "assemblers" of Eric Drexler.
- The song was also briefly featured in the popular British schools drama Grange Hill, being sung by the school choir during rehearsals.
- It was featured at the end of a fourth season episode of the show Northern Exposure.
- In 2010, twice Ivor Novello Awards-nominated band The Leisure Society performed the song for the American Laundromat Records children's compilation, Sing Me to Sleep - Indie Lullabies.
- The song was also sung as a children's lullaby during episode 17 of the first season of the popular TV sitcom Everybody Loves Raymond.
- A slightly re-worked version of "Inchworm" appears in the opening and closing sequences of the video game Paper Mario.
