= Janette Davis =

American singer (1916–2005)

Background information
- Born: November 2, 1916; Memphis, Tennessee, United States
- Died: April 25, 2005 (aged 88)
- Spouse(s): Robert Jenson (m. 1939; div. 1945) Frank Musiello (m. 1957)

Dorothy Janette Marguerite Davis (November 2, 1916 – April 25, 2005) was a 20th-century American pop singer, noted particularly for her work for Arthur Godfrey.

== Biography ==
Dorothy Janette Marguerite Davis was born on November 2, 1916, in Memphis, Tennessee, the eldest of eight children, and grew up in Pine Bluff, Arkansas. She began singing and playing piano on the radio at age fourteen. Pursuing her career, Davis sang for radio stations in Quincy, Illinois, then Shreveport, Louisiana, then Cincinnati, after which she was a regular on NBC's Red Skelton show in 1939 and 1940. She then moved to Chicago and was a regular on Don McNeill's and Garry Moore's radio shows, then on various shows on radio station WBBM. Davis then became a radio staff singer for CBS in New York. There she was noticed by Arthur Godfrey who hired her in April 1946 as his resident female singer. The Arthur Godfrey show became very popular and earned Davis national exposure.

From 1947 to 1948, she had her own 15-minute radio show; her theme song was "I'll Get By". She appeared on programs and recorded the hillbilly song "I Didn't Know the Gun Was Loaded" which became her biggest hit. Davis stayed with Godfrey until 1956, when she retired from singing. She then became executive producer of Arthur Godfrey's Talent Scouts until that show's cancellation, after which she retired from show business entirely. Davis sang the Carolina Rice jingle, which ran nationally from the late 1940s well into the mid 1950s; she called it "my biggest hit record".

== Personal life ==
Davis was married to Robert Jenson from 1939 to 1945. She married Frank Musiello on October 17, 1957 and moved to Naples, Florida. She had two children. She died on April 25, 2005.
