= Arthur Godfrey's Talent Scouts =

American variety show (1946–1958)

- Country of origin: United States
- Language: English
- Starring: Arthur Godfrey
- Original release: July 2, 1946 – October 1, 1956
- Sponsored by: Lipton Tea

Arthur Godfrey's Talent Scouts (also known as Talent Scouts) is an American radio and television variety show that ran on CBS from 1946 until 1958. Sponsored by Lipton Tea, it starred Arthur Godfrey, who was also hosting Arthur Godfrey and His Friends at the same time.

== Overview ==
The concept for the show was that Godfrey had several "talent scouts" who brought their discoveries onto the program to showcase their talents. The winner of each show was determined by a meter that judged the audience's applause. The radio series began July 2, 1946, and was heard on CBS Tuesday evenings at 9pm. The winner on October 1, 1946, was pianist José Melis, who later became a familiar late night television personality as the orchestra leader on Jack Paar's Tonight show.

In the summer of 1947, Arthur Godfrey's Talent Scouts moved to Fridays at 9:30 p.m. After August 1947 it aired on Mondays at 8:30 p.m. The radio show continued until October 1, 1956. With Archie Bleyer leading the orchestra, the show's announcer was George Bryan. The show's opening (to the tune of "Four and Twenty Blackbirds") featured Peggy Marshall and the Holidays singing:

Here comes Arthur Godfrey
Your talent scout emcee
Brought to you by Lipton
Brisk Lipton Tea
You know it's Lipton Tea
If it's B-R-I-S-K
You know it's Arthur Godfrey
When you hear them play ...

At that point, the music would segue into trombonist Lou McGarity and the orchestra playing Godfrey's familiar theme song, "Seems Like Old Times", sometimes with Godfrey singing or humming along.

Contestants on the show included Pat Boone, The Chordettes, The McGuire Sisters and Carmel Quinn, all of whom went on to perform on Arthur Godfrey and His Friends. Other contestants included Tony Bennett, The Blackwood Brothers, Lenny Bruce, Laurie Carroll, Roy Clark, Rosemary Clooney, Ken Berry, Florian ZaBach, Wally Cox, Vic Damone, The Diamonds, Eddie Fisher, Connie Francis, Don Knotts, Steve Lawrence, Al Martino, Barbara McNair, Marian McPartland, Johnny Nash, Leslie Uggams, Lorraine Donahue (who later appeared on The Voice of Firestone), Joe Negri, Roger Williams (pianist), and Jonathan Winters. Swedish singer Kjerstin Dellert won a contest in 1948 with Someone to Watch Over Me, beginning her career as a vocalist there. Patsy Cline first gained national attention with a winning performance of Walkin' After Midnight on the January 21, 1957, broadcast. Among those who auditioned but were not chosen to appear on the broadcast were Buddy Holly, The Four Freshmen, and Elvis Presley.

== Television ==
Arthur Godfrey's Talent Scouts
- Also known as: Talent Scouts
- Genre: Variety
- Directed by: Dave Rich; Robert Stevens
- Starring: Arthur Godfrey
- Country of origin: United States
- Original language: English
- No. of seasons: 10

Production
- Camera setup: Multi-camera
- Running time: 24–25 minutes
- Production company: CBS Productions

Original release
- Network: CBS
- Release: December 6, 1948 – January 1, 1958

On television, Arthur Godfrey's Talent Scouts premiered December 6, 1948. According to the Nielsen ratings, it was the highest rated television show for the 1951–1952 season. It remained a highly popular show through the decade. The show took a great drop in ratings after orchestra bandleader Archie Bleyer left in the 1954–1955 season, but rebounded as the scouts continued to discover more talent. However, by the fall of 1957, television audiences began to prefer westerns and adventure shows to quiz programs and Godfrey's ratings dropped out of the top 30 Nielsen Chart. The show aired its final episode on January 1, 1958.

On December 24, 1956, the show became the first entertainment program to be videotaped for broadcast, as the then-new technology was used for a time-delayed rebroadcast in the Pacific Time Zone. An Ampex quadruplex videotape machine recorded the initial live broadcast to the Eastern part of the country, which was replayed three hours later. As with his radio programs, CBS allowed Godfrey to periodically host the show remotely from his Virginia farm while the rest of the cast and guests performed in New York.

== Broadcast history ==
Arthur Godfrey's Talent Scouts aired Monday at 8:30-9:00 PM on CBS its entire run.

== Ratings ==
- 1950–1951:#8
- 1951–1952:#1
- 1952–1953:#2
- 1953–1954:#3
- 1954–1955:#18
- 1955–1956:#16
- 1956–1957:#12

== Sources ==
Dunning, John. On the Air: The Encyclopedia of Old-Time Radio. New York: Oxford University Press, 1998. ISBN 0-19-507678-8

== Listen to ==
- Internet Archive: Arthur Godfrey
