= Arthur Godfrey =

American radio personality and television entertainer (1903–1983)

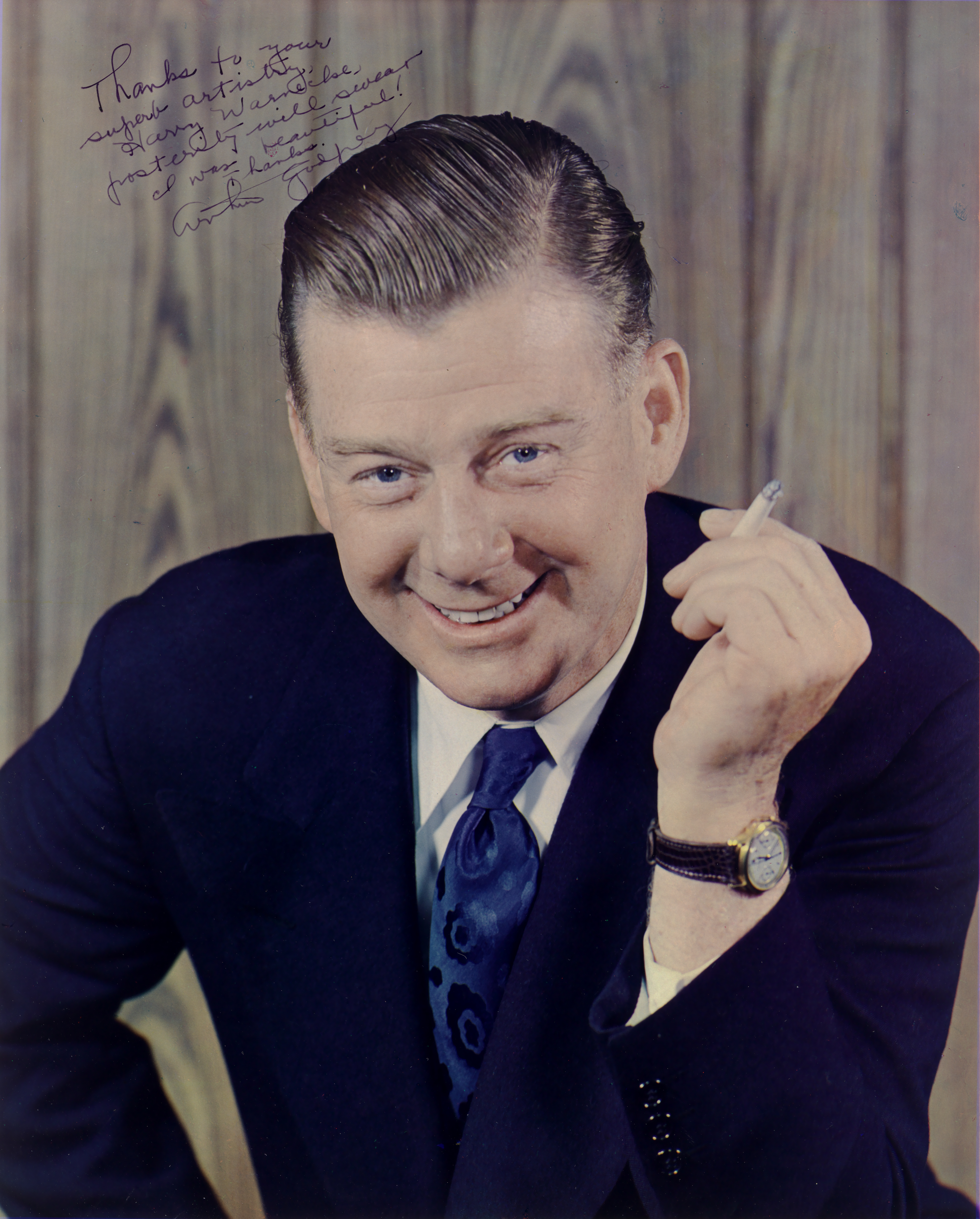
- Godfrey in 1947
- Born: Arthur Morton Leo Godfrey; August 31, 1903; Manhattan, New York, U.S.
- Died: March 16, 1983 (aged 79); Manhattan, New York, U.S.
- Occupations: Broadcaster, entertainer
- Years active: 1929–1979
- Spouse(s): Catherine (divorced) Mary Bourke (m. 1938; div. 1982)
- Children: 3

Arthur Morton Godfrey (August 31, 1903 – March 16, 1983) was an American radio and television broadcaster and entertainer. At the peak of his success, in the early to mid-1950s, Godfrey was heard on radio and seen on television up to six days a week, at times for as many as nine separate broadcasts for CBS. His programs included Arthur Godfrey Time (Monday-Friday mornings on radio and television), Arthur Godfrey's Talent Scouts (Monday evenings on radio and television), Arthur Godfrey and His Friends (Wednesday evenings on television), The Arthur Godfrey Digest (Friday evenings on radio) and King Arthur Godfrey and His Round Table (Sunday afternoons on radio).

In 1953, Godfrey's infamous on-air firing of cast member Julius La Rosa permanently damaged his kindly, down-to-earth, family-man image which resulted in an immediate decline of his popularity that he was never able to overcome. Over the next two years, Godfrey fired over twenty additional cast and crew members, under similar circumstances, for which he was heavily attacked by the press and public alike. A self-made man, Godfrey was fiercely competitive; some of his employees were fired for merely speaking with those he considered to be competitors, like Ed Sullivan, or for signing with a talent agent. By the late 1950s, CBS reduced his on-air presence to hosting his daily radio show, which ended in 1972, and the occasional television special.

Sometimes introduced by his nickname "the Old Redhead", Godfrey was strongly identified with many of his commercial sponsors, especially Chesterfield cigarettes and Lipton Tea. He advertised Chesterfield for many years, during which time he devised the slogan "Buy 'em by the carton"; he terminated his relationship with the company after he quit smoking, five years before he was diagnosed with lung cancer in 1959. Godfrey later became a prominent spokesman for the anti-tobacco movement.

== Early life ==
Godfrey was born in Manhattan in 1903 to Arthur Hanbury Godfrey and Kathryn Morton Godfrey. His mother was from a well-to-do Oswego, New York, family, which disapproved of her marriage. An older Englishman, the senior Godfrey was a sportswriter and considered an expert on surrey and hackney horses, but the advent of the automobile devastated the family's finances. By 1915, when Arthur was 12, the family had moved to Hasbrouck Heights, New Jersey. Godfrey dropped out after a single year at Hasbrouck Heights High School. The eldest of five children, he worked before and after school at an early age, and left home at 14 to ease the financial burden on his family. A year later he was a civilian typist at Camp Merritt, New Jersey, and enlisted in the United States Navy at 17, lying about his age.

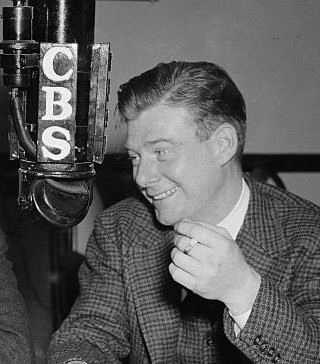
Godfrey spoke directly to his listeners as individuals; he was a foremost pitchman into the TV era

Godfrey's father was something of a "free thinker" by the standards of the era. He did not disdain organized religion but insisted that his children explore all faiths before deciding for themselves which to embrace. Their childhood included friends of Catholic, Jewish and various Protestant faiths. The senior Godfrey was friends with the Vanderbilts, but was democratic in his associations and enjoyed talking about issues of the day to total strangers. In the book Genius in the Family (G.P. Putnam's Sons, New York, 1962), written about their mother by Godfrey's youngest sister, Dorothy Gene (who preferred to be called "Jean"), with the help of their sister, Kathy, it was reported that the angriest they ever saw their father was when a man on the ferry declared the Ku Klux Klan a civic organization vital to the good of the community. They rode the ferry back and forth three times, with their father arguing with the man that the Klan was a bunch of "Blasted, bigoted fools, led 'round by the nose!"

Godfrey's mother, Kathryn, was a gifted artist and composer whose aspirations to fame were laid aside to take care of her family after her husband, whom she called "Darl'", died. Her creativity enabled the family to get through some very hard times. She played the piano to accompany silent films, made jams and jellies, crocheted bedspreads, and even cut off and sold her long hair, as it was extremely difficult for a woman of her social class to find work without violating social mores of the time. The one household item that was never sold was the piano, and she believed at least some of her children would succeed in show business. In her later years some of her compositions were performed by symphony orchestras in Canada, which earned her a mention in Time. In 1958, at the age of 78, her sauciness made her a big hit with the audience when she appeared on Groucho Marx's quiz show You Bet Your Life. She died of cancer in 1968 at a nursing home in a suburb north of Chicago.

Godfrey served in the Navy from 1920 to 1924 as a radio operator on naval destroyers, then returned home to care for the family after his father's death. Additional radio training came during Godfrey's service in the Coast Guard from 1927 to 1930. He passed a stringent qualifying examination and was admitted to the prestigious Radio Materiel School at the Naval Research Laboratory, graduating in 1929. During a Coast Guard stint in Baltimore he appeared in a local talent show broadcast on October 5 of that year and became popular enough to land his own brief weekly program.

== Radio ==
In this CBS publicity photo of Arthur Godfrey Time, vocalist Patti Clayton is seen at the far right and Godfrey sits in the foreground. Clayton, the original 1944 voice of Chiquita Banana, was married to Godfrey's director, Saul Ochs.

On leaving the Coast Guard, Godfrey became a radio announcer for Baltimore station WFBR (now WJZ (AM)), then moved to Washington, D.C., to become a staff announcer for NBC-owned station WRC the same year. He remained there until 1934.

Recovering from a near-fatal automobile accident en route to a flying lesson in 1931 (he was already an avid flyer), he decided to listen closely to the radio and realized that the stiff, formal style then used by announcers could not connect with the average radio listener. The announcers spoke in stentorian tones, as if giving a formal speech to a crowd and not communicating on a personal level. Godfrey vowed that when he returned to the airwaves, he would affect a relaxed, informal style as if he were talking to just one person. He also used that style in spoken commercials and became a regional star.

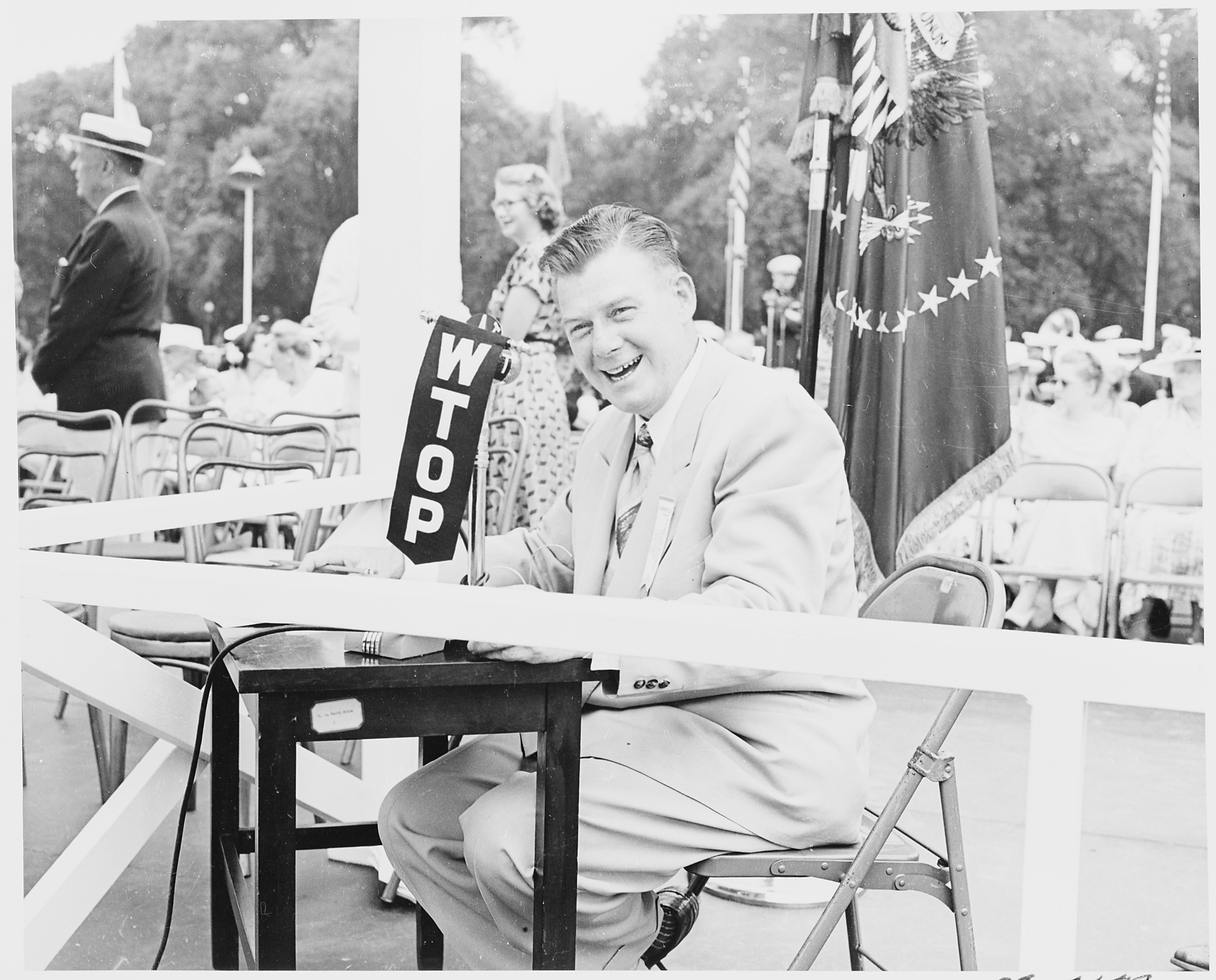
Godfrey at the 1948 ceremony marking the 100th anniversary of the Washington Monument

In addition to announcing, Godfrey sang and played the ukulele. In 1934 he became a freelance entertainer, but eventually based himself on a daily show titled Sundial on CBS-owned station WJSV (later WTOP and now WFED) in Washington. Godfrey was the station's morning disc jockey, playing records, delivering commercials (often with tongue in cheek; a classic example had him referring to Bayer Aspirin as "bare ass prin"), interviewing guests, and even reading news reports during his three-hour shift. Godfrey loved to sing, and would frequently sing random verses during the "talk" portions of his program. In 1937, he was a host on Professor Quiz, radio's first successful quiz program. One surviving broadcast from 1939 has Godfrey unexpectedly turning on his microphone to harmonize with the Foursome's recording of "There'll Be Some Changes Made". The same broadcast has him sneezing loudly on the air (which just wasn't done, and still isn't; on-air talent has a kill switch on the microphone that prevents unscheduled sounds from going out on the air).

Godfrey was eager to remain connected with the Navy, but found his hip injuries rendered him unsuitable for military service. He personally knew President Franklin D. Roosevelt, who listened to his Washington program, and through Roosevelt's intercession, he received a commission in the U.S. Naval Reserve before World War II. He would participate in exercises around the Washington area. Godfrey eventually moved his base to the CBS station in New York City, then known as WABC (later WCBS, now WHSQ), and was heard on both WJSV and WABC for a time. In the autumn of 1942, he also became the announcer for Fred Allen's Texaco Star Theater show on the CBS network, but a personality conflict between Allen and Godfrey led to his early release from the show after only six weeks.

== Network radio star ==
Godfrey became nationally known in April 1945 when, as CBS's morning-radio man in Washington, he took the microphone for a live, firsthand account of President Roosevelt's funeral procession. The entire CBS network picked up the broadcast, later preserved in the Edward R. Murrow and Fred W. Friendly record series, I Can Hear it Now. Unlike the tight-lipped news reporters and commentators of the day, who delivered news in an earnest, businesslike manner, Godfrey's tone was sympathetic and neighborly, lending immediacy and intimacy to his words. When identifying new President Harry S. Truman's car in the procession, Godfrey fervently said, in a choked voice, "God bless him, President Truman." Godfrey broke down in tears and cued the listeners back to the studio. The entire nation was moved by his emotional outburst.

CBS gave Arthur Godfrey his own morning time slot on the nationwide network. Arthur Godfrey Time was a Monday–Friday show that featured his monologues, interviews with various stars, music from his own in-house combo, and regular vocalists. Godfrey's monologues and discussions were usually unscripted, and went wherever he chose. Arthur Godfrey Time remained a late-morning staple on the CBS Radio Network schedule until 1972.

Godfrey was known for sparking impromptu jam sessions on the air with the band, all of them first-rate musicians who could improvise on the fly. He often grabbed his ukulele and launched into songs the band may not have rehearsed. He had insisted on employing musicians in his small orchestra who would be able to accompany him quickly and "follow" him as he sang. At other times, he would jump into a number sung by one of the cast members and continue it, encouraging solos from various band members. It was further proof of his insistence on spontaneity on the air. He later played a baritone ukulele. Over time, tutored by the band's guitarist Remo Palmier, Godfrey's playing took a decidedly jazzy quality. Palmier, a top Manhattan studio guitarist, was also a respected jazz guitarist and the only one of Godfrey's musicians to remain with the show from its 1945 debut until the final 1972 broadcast.

== Recordings ==
Two radio monologues proved to be audience favorites and were rebroadcast on several occasions by popular demand, and later on his television show. They were "What is a Boy?" and a follow-up, "What is a Girl?" With the skilled addition of sentimental music, both monologues captured the essence of what made parents love their children, fondly describing the highly varied personality traits of each child as the monologue progressed. "What is a Boy?" in particular proved to be so popular that it was released as one of Godfrey's records, which he issued on Columbia Records (Record no. 39487) in the summer of 1951, with "What is a Girl?" on the B-side of the record. It reached the top of the Billboard charts in August 1951, one of several successful records Godfrey released between 1947 and 1952.

In 1947, Godfrey had a surprise hit record with the novelty "Too Fat Polka (She's Too Fat for Me)" written by Ross MacLean and Arthur Richardson. The song reached number two in the US charts and its popularity led to the Andrews Sisters recording a version adapted to the women's point-of-view. In general, Godfrey despised most of his novelty recordings, including "Too Fat Polka", which was his biggest-selling record with over one million copies sold.

Godfrey's other record hits included "Candy and Cake"; "Dance Me Loose". "I'm Looking Over a Four Leaf Clover"; "Slap 'Er Down Again, Paw"; "Slow Poke"; and "The Thing".

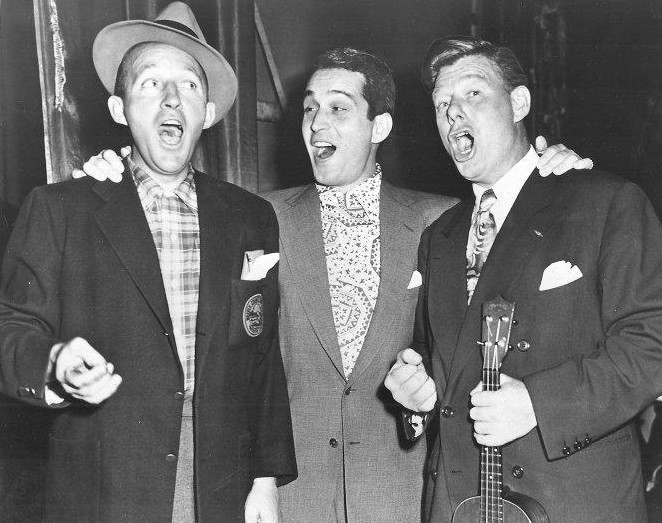
Publicity still with Bing Crosby and Perry Como in 1950 for Crosby's radio show

== Companion shows ==
Godfrey's morning show was supplemented by a prime-time variety show, Arthur Godfrey's Talent Scouts, broadcasting from the CBS Studio Building at 49 East 52nd Street, where he had his main office. This variety show, a showcase for rising young performers, was a slight variation of CBS's successful Original Amateur Hour. Some of the performers had made public appearances in their home towns and were recommended to Godfrey by friends or colleagues. These "sponsors" would accompany the performers to the broadcast and introduce them to Godfrey on the air. Two acts from the same 1948 broadcast were Wally Cox and the Chordettes. Both were big hits that night, and both were signed to recording contracts. Godfrey took special interest in the Chordettes, who sang his kind of barbershop-quartet harmony, and he soon made them part of his broadcasting and recording "family".

Performers who appeared on Talent Scouts included Lenny Bruce, Don Adams, Tony Bennett, Patsy Cline, Lu Ann Simms, Pat Boone, opera singer Marilyn Horne, Roy Clark, and Irish vocalist Carmel Quinn. Later, he promoted "Little Godfrey" Janette Davis to a management position as the show's talent coordinator. Three notable acts rejected for the show were Buddy Holly, the Four Freshmen, and Elvis Presley. Following his appearances on the Louisiana Hayride, Presley traveled to New York for an unsuccessful Talent Scouts audition in April 1955. After the Talent Scouts staff rejected the Orioles, they went on to have a hit record with their version of "Crying in the Chapel" (a cover of the song by Darrell Glenn, written by his father, Artie, and a subsequent hit for Presley as well). That success kicked off the "bird-named group" trend of early rock 'n' roll.

Beginning in January 1950, another Godfrey program on CBS Radio, Arthur Godfrey's Digest, was a transcribed compilation of highlights from morning shows of the preceding week. The 30-minute show was broadcast on Saturdays at 9:30 p.m. Eastern Time, sponsored by Chesterfield cigarettes.

Godfrey was one of the busiest men in the entertainment industry, often presiding over several daytime and evening radio and TV shows simultaneously. (Even busier was Robert Q. Lewis, who hosted Arthur Godfrey Time whenever Godfrey was absent, adding to his own tight schedule.) Both Godfrey and Lewis made commercial recordings for Columbia Records, often featuring the "Little Godfreys" in various combinations. In 1951 Godfrey also narrated a nostalgic movie documentary, Fifty Years Before Your Eyes, produced for Warner Bros. Pictures by silent-film anthologist Robert Youngson.

Godfrey had been in pain since the 1931 car crash that damaged his hip. In 1953, he underwent pioneering hip replacement surgery in Boston using an early plastic artificial hip joint. The operation was successful and he returned to the show to the delight of his vast audience. During his recovery, CBS was so concerned about losing Godfrey's audience that they encouraged him to broadcast live from his Beacon Hill estate (near Leesburg, Virginia), with the signal carried by microwave towers built on the property.

Godfrey was also an avid amateur radio operator, with the station call sign K4LIB. He was a member of the National Association of Broadcasters Hall of Fame in the radio division.

== Theatre ==
In 1946, Arthur Godfrey appeared in the Broadway revue Three to Make Ready, "offering monologues and serving as a kind of master of ceremonies." In 1965, he appeared as Harry Lambert in Never Too Late at the Playhouse Theatre, with Maureen O'Sullivan.

== Television ==
1953 portrait of Godfrey with ukulele

In 1948, Arthur Godfrey's Talent Scouts began to be simultaneously broadcast on radio and television, and by 1952, Arthur Godfrey Time also appeared on both media. The radio version ran an hour and a half; the TV version an hour, later expanded to an hour and a half. The Friday shows were heard on radio only, because at the end of the week, Godfrey traditionally broadcast his portion from a studio at his Virginia farm outside of Washington, D.C., and TV cameras were unable to transmit live pictures of him and his New York cast at the same time.

In 1949, Arthur Godfrey and His Friends, a weekly informal variety show, began on CBS-TV in prime time. His affable personality combined warmth, heart, and occasional bits of double entendre repartee, such as his remark when the show went on location: "Well, here we are in Miami Bitch. Heh-heh." Godfrey received adulation from fans who felt that despite his considerable wealth, he was really "one of them", his personality that of a friendly next-door neighbor.

== As commercial pitchman ==
Godfrey's skills as a commercial pitchman brought him a large number of loyal sponsors, including Lipton Tea, Frigidaire, Pillsbury cake mixes, and Liggett & Myers's Chesterfield cigarettes. His popularity and ability to sell brought a windfall to CBS, accounting for a significant percentage of its corporate profits. By 1959, total advertising billings from Godfrey's TV shows were estimated at an industry-high $150 million, almost double those of second-place Ed Sullivan.

Godfrey found that one way to enhance his sales pitches was to make fun of the sponsors, the sponsors' company executives, and advertising-agency types who wrote the scripted commercials that he regularly ignored. (If he read them at all, he ridiculed them or even crumpled the scripts and threw them aside in front of the cameras.) To the surprise of the advertising agencies and sponsors, Godfrey's flippancy during the commercials frequently enhanced the sales of the sponsor's products, as he never showed any disrespect for the products themselves. The sponsors sided with Godfrey, and the ad agencies were powerless to stop him.

His ability to sell products, insisting he would not promote any in which he did not personally believe, gave him a level of trust from his audience, a belief that "if Godfrey said it, it must be so." When he quit smoking after his 1953 hip surgery, he began speaking out on the air against smoking, to the displeasure of longtime sponsor Chesterfield. When he stood his ground, the company withdrew as a sponsor in early 1954. Godfrey shrugged off their departure since he knew other sponsors would easily fill the vacancy.

Godfrey's immense popularity and the trust placed in him by audiences was noticed not only by advertisers but also by his friend, President Dwight Eisenhower, who asked him to record a number of public service announcements to be played on American television in the case of nuclear war. It was thought that viewers would be reassured by Godfrey's grandfatherly tone and folksy manner. The existence of the PSA recordings was confirmed in 2004 by former CBS president Dr. Frank Stanton in an exchange with a writer with the website Conelrad.

== The Little Godfreys ==
Godfrey began to veer away from interviewing stars in favor of a small group of regular performers that became known as the "Little Godfreys". Many of these artists were relatively obscure, but were given colossal national exposure, some of them former Talent Scouts winners, including Hawaiian vocalist Haleloke, veteran Irish tenor Frank Parker, Marion Marlowe and Julius La Rosa, who was in the Navy when Godfrey, doing his annual Naval reserve duty, discovered the young singer. He subsequently invited him on the show as a guest, offering him a job upon his discharge. La Rosa joined the cast in 1951 and became a favorite with Godfrey's immense audience, who also saw him on the prime-time weekly show Arthur Godfrey and his Friends. Godfrey also had a regular announcer-foil on the show, Tony Marvin. Godfrey preferred his performers not to use personal managers or agents, but often had his staff represent the artists if they were doing personal appearances, which allowed him considerable control over their careers and incomes. In 1953, after La Rosa hired an agent, Godfrey was so angry that he fired him on the air.

== Racehorse owner ==
Arthur Godfrey was a fan of Thoroughbred horseracing which led to him becoming an owner of several racehorses. His best known was Lord Willin’ as a result of the horse having an important part in a nationally televised movie titled Post Time: U.S.A.

== Aviation ==
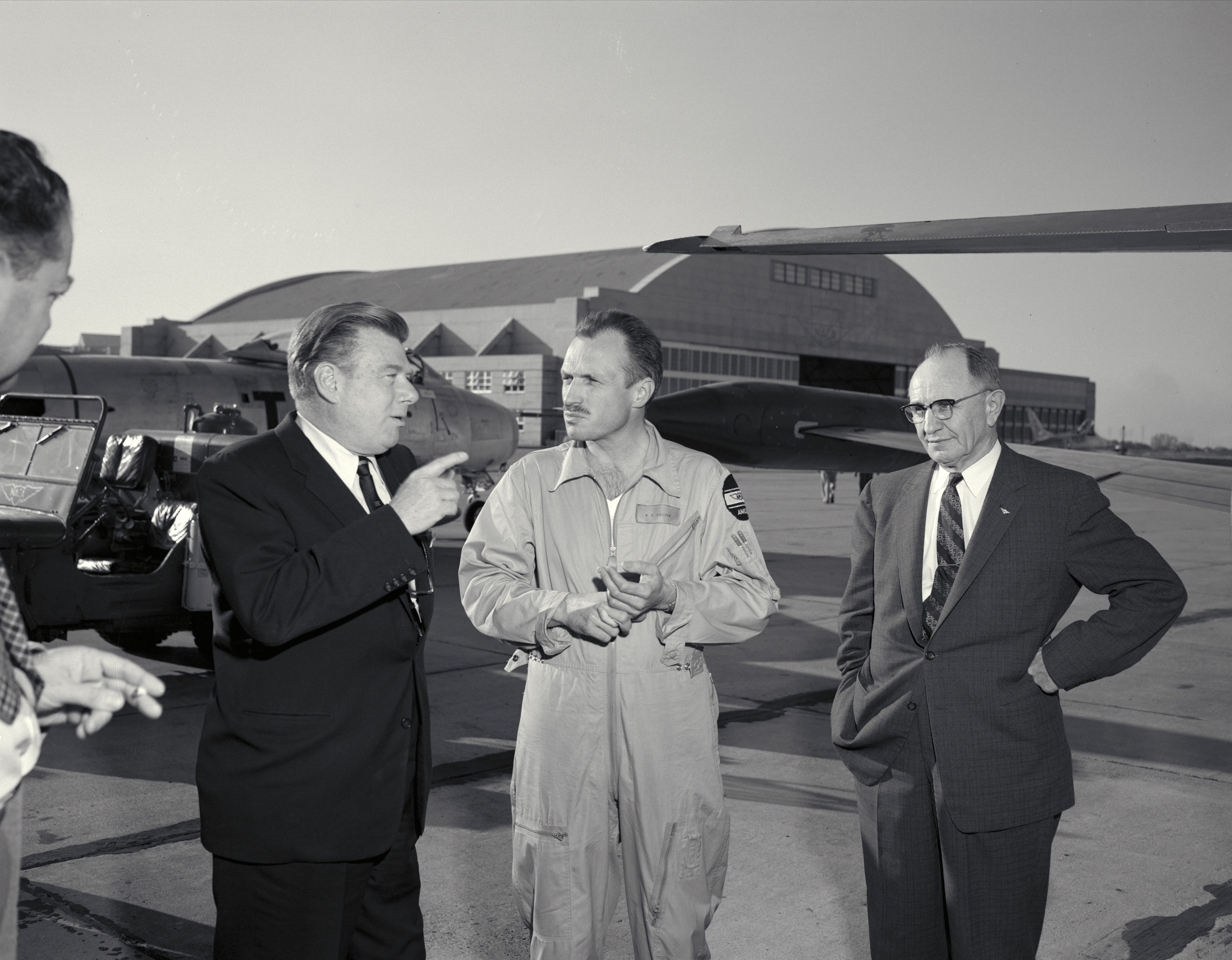
Godfrey (left) with NACA pilot George Cooper and Ames Research Center director Smith DeFrance

Godfrey learned to fly in 1929 while working in broadcast radio in the Washington, D.C., area, starting with gliders, then learning to fly airplanes. He was badly injured on his way to a flying lesson one afternoon in 1931 when an oncoming truck lost its left front wheel and hit him head on. Godfrey spent months recuperating, and the injury kept him from flying on active duty during World War II. He served in a public affairs role during the war as a reserve officer in the United States Navy.

Godfrey used his pervasive fame to advocate a strong anti-Communist stance and to pitch for enhanced strategic air power in the Cold War atmosphere. In addition to his advocacy for civil rights, he became a strong promoter of his middle-class fans' vacationing in Hawaii and Miami Beach, Florida, formerly enclaves for the wealthy. In Hawaii, he helped raise funds for the "Coronation" carillon installed at the National Memorial Cemetery of the Pacific in 1956.

He made a television movie in 1953, taking the controls of an Eastern Air Lines Lockheed Constellation airliner and flying to Miami, thus showing how safe airline travel had become. As a reserve officer, he used his public position to cajole the Navy into qualifying him as a Naval Aviator, and played that against the United States Air Force, who later successfully recruited him into the Air Force Reserve.

His continued unpaid promotion of Eastern Air Lines earned him the gratitude of Eddie Rickenbacker, World War I flying ace and president of the airline. Rickenbacker took a retiring Douglas DC-3, fitted it out with an executive interior and DC-4 engines, and presented it to Godfrey, who then used it to commute to the studios in New York City from his Leesburg, Virginia, farm every Sunday night.

=== Aviation incidents ===
In January 1954, Godfrey buzzed the control tower of Teterboro Airport in his DC-3. His certificate was suspended for six months. He claimed the windy conditions that day required him to turn immediately after takeoff, but in fact he was upset because the tower would not give him the runway he requested. He later recorded a satirical song about the incident called "Teterboro Tower", roughly to the tune of "Wabash Cannonball". A similar event occurred while he flew near Chicago in 1956, though no sanctions were imposed.

=== Leesburg airport ===
The original Leesburg airport, which Godfrey owned and referred to affectionately on his show as "The Old Cow Pasture", was less than a mile from the center of town, and local residents had come to expect rattling windows and crashing dishes every Sunday evening and Friday afternoon.

In 1960, Godfrey proposed building a new airport by selling the old field and donating a portion of the sale to a local group. Since Godfrey funded the majority of the airport, it is now known as Leesburg Executive Airport at Godfrey Field. He was also known for flying a North American/Ryan Navion, a smaller single-engined airplane, a Lockheed Jetstar, and in later years a Beech Baron and a Beech Duke, registration number N1M. In 1964, he became one of the founding members of the board of directors of Executive Jet Aviation Corporation.

== Later life ==
Godfrey was an avid hunter who teamed with professional guides to hunt big-game animals on safari in Africa.

In 1959, Godfrey began suffering chest pains. Examination by physicians revealed a mass in his chest that could have been lung cancer. Surgeons discovered cancer in one lung that spread to his aorta. One lung was removed. Yet, despite the disease's discouragingly high mortality rate, it became clear after radiation treatments that Godfrey had beaten the substantial odds against him. He returned to the air on a prime-time TV special but resumed the daily morning show on radio only, reverting to a format featuring guest stars such as ragtime pianist Max Morath and Irish vocalist Carmel Quinn, maintaining a live combo of first-rate Manhattan musicians (under the direction of Sy Mann) as he had done since the beginning. Godfrey also became a persuasive spokesman advocating regular medical checkups to detect cancer early, noting his cancer was cured only because it was discovered when still treatable.

Godfrey's initial return to television occurred in a TV special centered on his gratitude to have survived what was by 1959 standards, an almost-certain death sentence. He sang, danced, did commercials and announced that he'd make greater use of the new videotape technology for the future. Despite appearing healthy on the broadcast, Godfrey, fearing the after-effects of his illness would adversely affect his appearance, announced that he would resume the Monday–Friday Arthur Godfrey Time on radio only, ending the daily TV broadcasts.

Long-time announcer Tony Marvin, with Godfrey since the late 1940s, did not make the transition to the new program. Marvin was one of Godfrey's few associates who left on amicable terms, and went on to a career as a radio news anchor on the Mutual Broadcasting System. The Godfrey show was the last daily long-form entertainment program on American network radio when Godfrey and CBS agreed to end it in April 1972, when his 20-year contract with the network expired. Godfrey by then was a colonel in the United States Air Force Reserve and still an active pilot.

He appeared in the films 4 for Texas (1963), The Glass Bottom Boat (1966), and Where Angels Go, Trouble Follows (1968). He briefly co-hosted the 1960–61 debut season of Candid Camera with creator Allen Funt, but that relationship, like so many others, ended abruptly and acrimoniously; Godfrey hosted at least one broadcast without Funt. Godfrey also made various guest appearances, and he and Lucille Ball co-hosted the CBS special 50 Years of Television (1978). He also made a cameo appearance in the 1979 B-movie Angels Revenge.

=== Post-retirement ===
In retirement, Godfrey wanted to find ways back onto a regular TV schedule. He appeared on rock band Moby Grape's song "Just Like Gene Autry: A Foxtrot", a 1920s-pop-style piece from their album Wow.

Godfrey's political outlook was complex, and to some, contradictory; his lifelong admiration for Franklin Roosevelt combined with a powerful libertarian streak in his views and his open support for Dwight D. Eisenhower as president.

During his later years he became a powerful voice for the environmentalist movement who identified with the youth culture that irreverently opposed the "establishment", as he felt that he had done during his peak years. He renounced a lucrative endorsement deal with Colgate-Palmolive when it became clear to him that it clashed with his environmental principles. He had made commercials for Colgate toothpaste and the detergent Axion, only to repudiate the latter product when he found out that Axion contained phosphates, implicated in water pollution. He did far fewer commercials after that incident.

While Godfrey was a great fan of technology, including aviation and aerospace developments, he also found time for pursuits of an earlier era. He was a dedicated horseman and master at dressage and made charity appearances at horse shows.

He also found in later years that his enthusiasm for high-tech had its limits when he concluded that some technological developments posed the potential to threaten the environment. During one appearance on The Dick Cavett Show, Godfrey commented that the United States needed the supersonic transport (SST) "about as much as we need another bag of those clunkers from the moon." The concern that the SST contributed to noise pollution, an issue Godfrey was instrumental in raising in the United States, is considered to have effectively ended SST interest in the U.S., leaving it to Britain and France. (Cavett claims that Godfrey's statement also earned tax audits from the Richard Nixon-era Internal Revenue Service for the show's entire production staff.)

Although Godfrey's desire to remain in the public eye never faltered, his presence ebbed considerably over the next ten years, despite an HBO special and an appearance on a PBS salute to the 1950s. A 1981 attempt to reconcile him with La Rosa for a Godfrey show reunion record album, bringing together Godfrey and a number of the "Little Godfreys", collapsed. Godfrey had initially resisted the idea, floated by his agent, but finally relented. At an initially amicable meeting, Godfrey reasserted that La Rosa wanted out of his contract and asked why he had not explained that instead of insisting he was fired without warning. When La Rosa began reminding him of the dance lesson controversy, Godfrey, then in his late seventies, exploded and the meeting ended in shambles.

=== The Arthur Godfrey Collection ===
Toward the end of his life, Godfrey became a major supporter of public broadcasting, and left his large personal archive of papers and programs to public station WNET/Thirteen in New York. Godfrey biographer Arthur Singer helped to arrange a permanent home for the Godfrey material at the Broadcasting Archives at the University of Maryland in early 1998. The collection contains hundreds of kinescopes of Godfrey television programs, more than 4,000 audiotapes and wire recordings of his various radio shows, videotapes, and transcription discs. The collection also contains Godfrey's voluminous personal papers and business records, which cover his spectacular rise and precipitous fall in the industry over a period of more than 50 years.

== Personal life ==
Godfrey was married twice. He and his first wife, Catherine, had one child. He was next married to the former Mary Bourke from February 24, 1938, until their divorce in 1982, a year before his death. They had two children.

== Death ==
Godfrey began to suffer from emphysema, thought to have been caused by decades of smoking and the radiation treatments for his lung cancer, in the early 1980s. He died from it at Mount Sinai Hospital in Manhattan on March 16, 1983, at the age of 79, and was buried at Union Cemetery in Leesburg, Virginia, not far from his farm.

== Partial discography ==
- Arthur Godfrey's TV Calendar Show (1953)
- Christmas with Arthur Godfrey and All the Little Godfreys (1953)
- A Visit to New York with Arthur Godfrey and All the Little Godfreys (1955)
- Godfrey and His Friends (1956)

== Awards ==
- NBAA Meritorious Service to Aviation Award (1950)
- National Association of Broadcasters Hall of Fame (radio)
- National Aviation Hall of Fame (1987)
- Radio Hall of Fame (1988)
- Peabody Award (1971)
- Hollywood Walk of Fame ( Honored with three stars; Radio, TV, Recording)
- Ukulele Hall of Fame (2001)
- In 2002 Godfrey was one of only three people named on both of industry publication Talkers Magazine's 25 greatest radio, and 25 greatest television, talk show hosts of all time lists.
