= Wonderful Copenhagen =

Single by Danny Kaye

from the album Hans Christian Andersen
- B-side: "Anywhere I Wander"
- Released: 1953
- Genre: Film, waltz
- Label: Brunswick
- Songwriter: Frank Loesser

"Wonderful Copenhagen" is a song and single written by Frank Loesser performed by Danny Kaye with Gordon Jenkins and his orchestra and released in 1953.

It was taken from the 1952 film, Hans Christian Andersen and is considered to be the best known song in the film. It occurs in the film where Andersen, played by Kaye, is about to be expelled from Odense and his apprentice Peter advocates going to Copenhagen.

The single reached number five in the UK Singles Chart in 1953 during a 10-week stay on the chart.

== Legacy ==
Loesser had never visited Copenhagen when he wrote the song. The Danes took to the song and Loesser was greeted as a national hero when he subsequently visited Denmark. The song was used by the local tourist organisation but was not a hit in Denmark due to Kaye's pronunciation of "Copenhagen", which made the word sound German and thus neither English nor Danish.

After the film, The Copenhagen Tourist Organisation took the name "Wonderful Copenhagen".
