= Carmel Quinn =

Irish-American singer and actress (1925–2021)

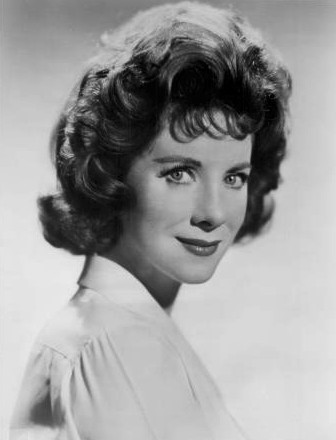
- Quinn in 1964

Background information
- Born: 31 July 1925; Dublin, Ireland
- Died: 6 March 2021 (aged 95) Leonia, New Jersey, United States
- Genres: Pop, musical theatre
- Occupations: Singer, entertainer
- Spouse: William Fuller

Carmel Quinn (31 July 1925 – 6 March 2021) was an Irish-American entertainer who appeared on Broadway, television and radio after immigrating to the United States in 1954.

== Biography ==
Quinn was born in July 1925 and educated in Dublin. Her father was a violinist and the family was musically inclined. She began her career in Dublin singing with local bands, the most prominent of which was the Johnny Devlin Orchestra in the Crystal Ballroom, although her singing had been recorded as early as 1942 when she was a teenager. She also sang at Dublin's Theatre Royal with the house orchestra and Jimmy Campbell. She was noted for one of her first songs, "The Isle of Innisfree".

After coming to the United States in 1954, she appeared on the Arthur Godfrey's Talent Scouts radio program in 1955 and won the contest. Her voice and performing style was compared to that of Judy Garland and other popular singers. She became a regular on the show, appearing daily, singing and telling funny anecdotes about her life. She went on to appear on the television version of Arthur Godfrey and His Friends. Unlike many of the so-called "Little Godfreys", whom Godfrey capriciously dismissed from his shows and left with bitter feelings, Quinn remained a frequent guest throughout Godfrey's television career and appeared on the CBS radio version of Arthur Godfrey Time, which he hosted until 1972. She continued to be a favourite with audiences and made guest appearances on The Pat Boone Chevy Showroom (three times between 1957 and 1960), The Ed Sullivan Show, The Joe Franklin Show, Match Game, Candid Camera, and other variety and talk shows.

She went on to appear in numerous musical roadshows, and starred in Wildcat, Finian's Rainbow and The Sound of Music. She performed for presidents John F. Kennedy and Lyndon B. Johnson. Her annual Saint Patrick's Day Concerts at Carnegie Hall sold out for more than two decades. She appeared in numerous television commercials and recorded many successful albums. She received a Grammy Award nomination for her children's recording of "Patrick Muldoon and his Magic Balloon". One of her biggest hits was "The Whistling Gypsy Rover".

She continued to record, and many of her early recordings have been reissued on CD. In 1991, she was the second woman to receive the John F. Kennedy Award for excellence in her field. She also continued to perform her cabaret show throughout the United States as well as maintaining a commitment to numerous American and Irish charities. Quinn was a longtime resident of Leonia, New Jersey, acquiring her first home there, after coming to the United States.

=== Personal life and death ===
Quinn was married to Irish businessman and impresario William "Bill" Fuller (1917–2008); the marriage eventually ended in divorce. Quinn never remarried. The couple had four children, Michael, Jane, Terry and Sean. Michael predeceased his parents, dying from an undiagnosed cardiac ailment in 1988, aged 31.

She died of pneumonia at her home in Leonia, on 6 March 2021, at the age of 95.

== Discography ==
- Patrick Muldoon and His Magic Balloon (1965), amazon.com. Retrieved 11 December 2014.
- Carmel Quinn's Ireland, regorecords.com. Retrieved 11 December 2014.
