= Frank Loesser =

American songwriter (1910–1969)

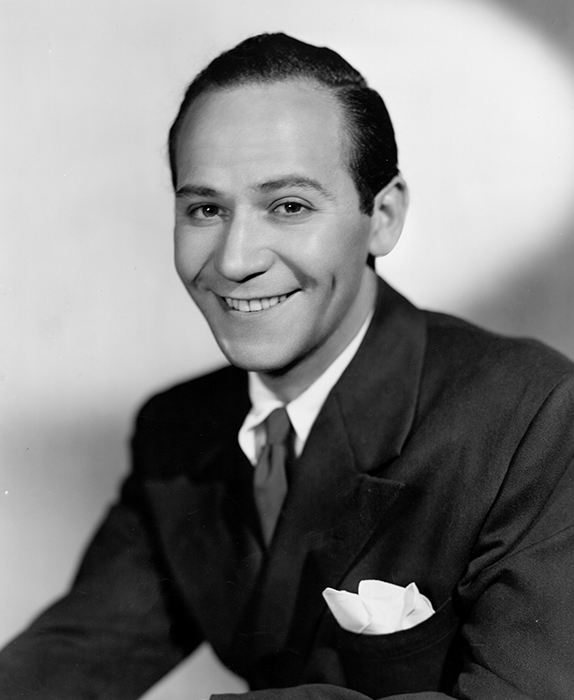
- Loesser in a 1936 Paramount studio headshot

Background information
- Born: Frank Henry Loesser; June 29, 1910; New York City, U.S.
- Died: July 28, 1969 (aged 59) New York City, U.S.
- Genre: Musical theatre
- Occupations: Composer, lyricist, librettist
- Years active: 1931–1968
- Spouses: Lynn Garland (m. 1936; div. 1957) Jo Sullivan (m. 1959)
- Website: frankloesser.com

Frank Henry Loesser (/ˈlɛsər/ "lesser"; June 29, 1910 – July 28, 1969) was an American songwriter who wrote music and lyrics for the Broadway musicals Guys and Dolls and How to Succeed in Business Without Really Trying, among others. He won a Tony Award for Guys and Dolls and shared the Pulitzer Prize for Drama for How to Succeed. He also wrote songs for over 60 Hollywood films and Tin Pan Alley, many of which have become standards, and was nominated for five Academy Awards for best song, winning once for "Baby, It's Cold Outside" (IPI name identifier 00018339583).

== Early years ==
Frank Henry Loesser was born to a Jewish family in New York City, the son of Henry Loesser, a pianist, and Julia Ehrlich. He grew up in a house on West 107th Street in Manhattan.

Henry had moved to America to avoid German military service and work in his family's banking business. He married Bertha Ehrlich; their son, Arthur Loesser, was born August 26, 1894. Bertha's younger sister Julia arrived in America in 1898, marrying Henry in 1907 after Bertha died in childbirth. Grace, their first child, was born in December of that year. Their son Frank was born June 29, 1910.

Loesser's parents, secular German Jews, prized high intellect and culture and educated him musically in the vein of European composers. Although Henry was a full-time piano teacher, he never taught Frank. In a 1914 letter to Arthur, Henry wrote that four-year-old Frank could play by ear "any tune he's heard and can spend an enormous amount of time at the piano." (Frank Loesser later collaborated with musical secretaries to ensure that his written scores reflected the music as he conceived it.)

Loesser disliked his father's refined taste in music, and resisted by writing his own music and taking up the harmonica. He was expelled from Townsend Harris High School; from there, he went to City College of New York, but was expelled in 1925 after one year for failing every subject except English and gym.

After his father died suddenly on July 20, 1926, Loesser was forced to work to support his family. His jobs included restaurant reviewer, process server, classified ad salesman for the New York Herald Tribune, political cartoonist for The Tuckahoe Record, sketch writer for Keith Vaudeville Circuit, knit-goods editor for Women's Wear Daily, press representative for a small movie company, and city editor for New Rochelle News, a short-lived newspaper in New Rochelle, New York.

== Early career as lyricist ==
Loesser's first song credit was "In Love with the Memory of You," with music by William Schuman, published in 1931. Other early lyrical credits included two hit songs of 1934, "Junk Man" and "I Wish I Were Twins," both with music by Joe Meyer and the latter with co-lyric credit to Eddie DeLange. "Junk Man" was first recorded that year by Benny Goodman with Mildred Bailey on vocals.

In the mid-1930s, Loesser (along with composer Irving Actman) performed at nightspot the Back Drop on East 52nd Street. By day, he worked at Leo Feist Inc. writing lyrics to Joseph Brandfon's music for $100 per week. However, after a year, Feist had not published any of the songs. Loesser fared only slightly better collaborating with future classical composer Schuman, selling their 1931 song (which unfortunately would flop) to Feist. Loesser described his early days of learning the craft as having "a rendezvous with failure." While he dabbled in other trades, he persistently returned to the music business.

Loesser's work at the Back Drop led to his first Broadway musical (which lasted only four nights), The Illustrator's Show, a 1936 revue written with Back Drop collaborator Actman. The previous year while performing at the Back Drop, Loesser met aspiring singer Lynn Garland (née Mary Alice Blankenbaker). He proposed marriage in a September 1936 letter that included money for a railroad ticket to Los Angeles, where Loesser's contract to Universal Pictures had just ended. The couple was married in a judge's office.

Loesser was offered a contract by Paramount Pictures. His first song credit there was "Moon of Manakoora," written with Alfred Newman for Dorothy Lamour for the film The Hurricane. He wrote lyrics for many popular songs during this period, including "Two Sleepy People" and "Heart and Soul" with Hoagy Carmichael and "I Hear Music" with Burton Lane. He also collaborated with the composers Arthur Schwartz and Joseph J. Lilley.

One of his notable efforts (with music by Friedrich Hollaender) was "See What the Boys in the Back Room Will Have," memorably sung by Marlene Dietrich in Destry Rides Again.

In 1941, Loesser wrote "I Don't Want to Walk Without You" with Jule Styne, included in the 1942 film Sweater Girl and sung by Betty Jane Rhodes. Irving Berlin was a huge fan of the song and once played it repeatedly, telling Loesser why he believed it was the greatest song he wished he'd written.

Members of the Western Writers of America chose the 1942 song "Jingle Jangle Jingle," for which Loesser wrote the lyrics, as one of the Top 100 Western songs of all time.

Loesser stayed in Hollywood until his enlistment during World War II.

== World War II era ==
Loesser enlisted in the Army Air Forces in October 1942; he continued to write lyrics for films and single songs. Loesser created the popular war song "Praise the Lord and Pass the Ammunition" (1942), inspired by the words of Navy chaplain Howell Forgy. Loesser wrote other songs at the request of the armed forces, including "What Do You Do in the Infantry?" and "The Ballad of Rodger Young" (1943). He also wrote "They're Either Too Young or Too Old" for the 1943 film Thank Your Lucky Stars.

In 1944, Loesser worked as the lyricist on the little-known musical Hi Yank!, performed by and for U.S. soldiers abroad, with music by Alex North. Hi Yank! was produced by the U.S. Army Office of Special Services (Note: "Special Services" historically refers to the entertainment and recreation branches of the military, and should not be confused with special operations.) as a "blueprint special" to boost the morale of soldiers located where USO shows could not visit. The "blueprint" was a book containing a musical script with instructions for staging the show using materials locally available to deployed soldiers. According to a document at the U.S. Army Centre for Military History, a touring company formed in Italy was slated to produce the musical. Hi Yank! was generally forgotten until 2008, when the PBS History Detectives researched the case of a long-saved radio transcription disc. The disc has two songs and a promotional announcement for the show's Fort Dix premiere in August 1944, when the disc was broadcast there.

== Broadway and later film career ==
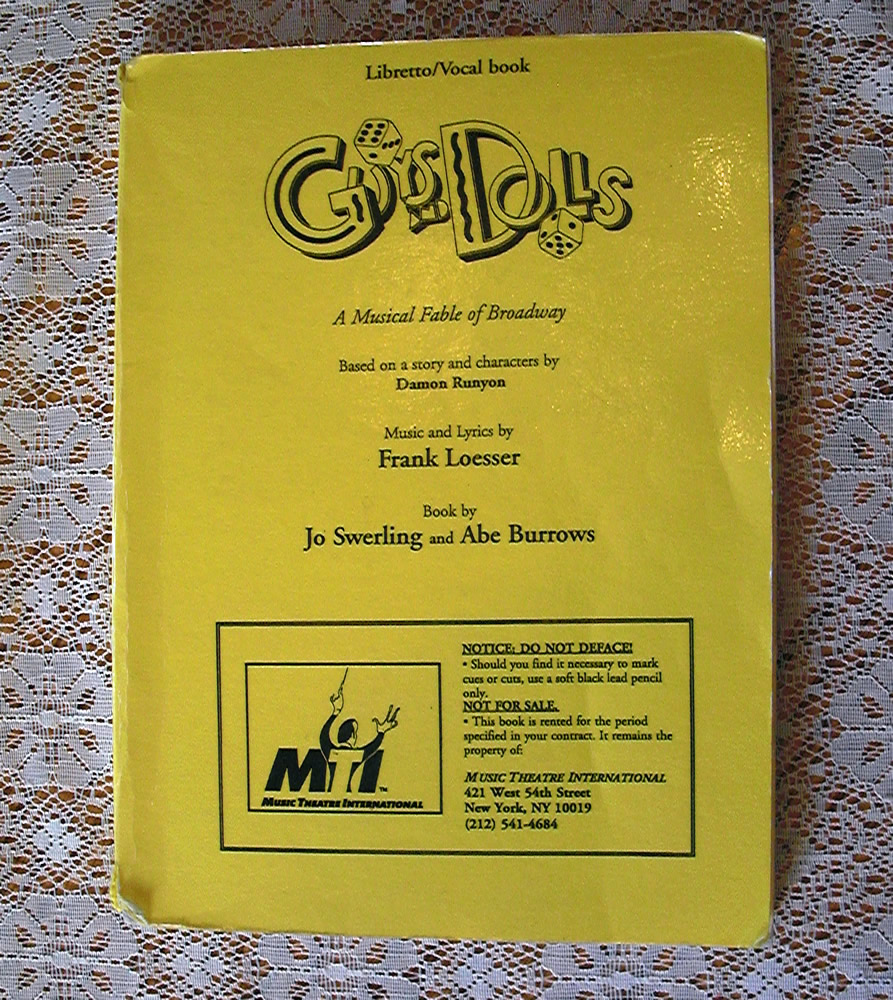
Guys and Dolls, Libretto and Vocal book, printed by Music Theatre International, 1978

In 1948, Broadway producers Cy Feuer and Ernest H. Martin asked Loesser to write music and lyrics to George Abbott's book for an adaptation of the Brandon Thomas play Charley's Aunt. The musical, Where's Charley? (1948), starred Ray Bolger (who performed one of the musical's more memorable songs, "Once In Love With Amy") and ran for 792 performances. A film version was released in 1952.

Also in 1948, Loesser sold to MGM the rights to "Baby, It's Cold Outside", a song he wrote in 1944 and performed informally at parties with his then-wife Lynn Garland. The studio included it in the 1949 movie Neptune's Daughter, and the song became a huge hit, with several recordings on the Billboard charts that year. Garland was upset at Loesser for selling what she considered "their song," but it won the Academy Award for Best Original Song.

His next musical, Guys and Dolls (1950), based on the stories of Damon Runyon, was again produced by Feuer and Martin. Guys and Dolls became a hit and earned Loesser a Tony Award. Bob Fosse called Guys and Dolls "the greatest American musical of all time". A 1955 film version starred Marlon Brando, Jean Simmons, Frank Sinatra, and Vivian Blaine.

In 1950, Loesser started Frank Music Corporation. Initially created as a means of controlling and publishing his work, the company eventually supported other writers, including Richard Adler, Jerry Ross, and Meredith Willson. Loesser also started the theatrical licensing company Music Theatre International (MTI) in 1952. Frank Music and MTI were sold to CBS Music in 1976. CBS in turn sold Frank Music to Paul McCartney's MPL Communications holding company in 1979.

Also in 1952, Loesser wrote the score for the film Hans Christian Andersen. The movie's songs, performed by leading man Danny Kaye and other cast members, include "Wonderful Copenhagen," "Anywhere I Wander," "Thumbelina," and "Inchworm."

Loesser wrote the book, music, and lyrics for his next two musicals, The Most Happy Fella (1956) and Greenwillow (1960). Around the beginning of 1957, Garland and Loesser divorced, and Loesser began a relationship with Jo Sullivan, who had played Rosabella in Fella. He wrote the music and lyrics for How to Succeed in Business Without Really Trying (1961), which ran for 1,417 performances, won the 1962 Pulitzer Prize for Drama, and received another Tony and a Grammy Award for Best Musical Theater Album.

Pleasures and Palaces (1965), the last Loesser musical produced during his lifetime, closed during out-of-town tryouts.

== Later life and death ==
From 1965 until 1968, Loesser was composing the book, music and lyrics for Señor Discretion Himself, a musical version of a Budd Schulberg short story.

When asked why he did not write more shows, Loesser responded, "I don't write slowly. It's just that I throw out fast." The New York Times confirmed his hard working habits and wrote that Loesser "was consumed by nervous energy and as a result slept only four hours a night, spending the rest of the time working."

A heavy cigarette smoker, Loesser died of lung cancer at age 59 on July 28, 1969, at the Mount Sinai Hospital in Manhattan's East Harlem neighborhood; he had requested that he be cremated, with his ashes scattered at sea.

A version of Señor Discretion Himself was presented in 1985 at the New York Musical Theatre Works. With the support of his widow, Jo Loesser, a completed version was presented at the Arena Stage, Washington, D.C., in 2004, reworked by the group Culture Clash and director Charles Randolph-Wright.

== Personal life ==
Lynn Garland and Frank Loesser divorced around the beginning of 1957 after 21 years of marriage. They had two children: John Loesser, who works in theatre administration, and Susan Loesser, an author who wrote her father's biography, A Most Remarkable Fella: Frank Loesser and the Guys and Dolls in His Life: A Portrait by His Daughter (1993, 2000, ISBN 0634009273).

Loesser married Jo Sullivan (born Elizabeth Josephine Sullivan) on April 29, 1959 after being introduced to her by Lynn. Frank and Jo had two daughters, Hannah and Emily. Emily is a performer who is married to actor Don Stephenson. Hannah was an artist in oils, pastels and mixed media; she died of cancer on January 25, 2007. Jo died on April 28, 2019, at age 91.

== Notable songs ==
The Ballad of Rodger Young
Performed by the West Point Cadet Glee Club, 1959.

Loesser was the lyricist of over 700 songs.

War songs

- "Praise the Lord and Pass the Ammunition" (1942)
- "The Ballad of Rodger Young" (1943)
- "What Do You Do in the Infantry" (1943)

Broadway musicals

- "A Bushel and a Peck", "Fugue for Tinhorns", "If I Were A Bell" (a favorite of Miles Davis, featured in recordings with John Coltrane), "Luck Be a Lady Tonight", "Sit Down, You're Rockin' the Boat," and "I'll Know" from Guys and Dolls
- "Standing on the Corner" and "Joey, Joey, Joey" from The Most Happy Fella
- "Never Will I Marry" from Greenwillow

Films and Tin Pan Alley

- "Baby, It's Cold Outside" from the M-G-M picture Neptune's Daughter (1949). Loesser had written this song in 1944 for a housewarming for himself and his wife, and the two went on to perform it occasionally at parties for the private entertainment of friends. They also recorded the song for Mercury Records. Under contract to Metro-Goldwyn-Mayer to supply a full score for Neptune's Daughter, Loesser included the song.
- "Heart and Soul" (from the Paramount short subject A Song is Born) – lyrics
- "I Don't Want to Walk Without You" from the Paramount picture Sweater Girl (1942), performed on screen by Betty Jane Rhodes
- "Let's Get Lost" from Happy Go Lucky (1943) This song inspired the title to the 1988 documentary film with the same title about jazz trumpeter and singer Chet Baker, who recorded it several times.
- "On a Slow Boat to China" (1948)
- "Spring Will Be a Little Late This Year" from the Universal picture Christmas Holiday (1944)
- "Inch Worm", "Thumbelina", "The Ugly Duckling," and "Wonderful Copenhagen" from the Samuel Goldwyn picture Hans Christian Andersen (1952)
- "Two Sleepy People" (music by Hoagy Carmichael) from the Paramount picture Thanks for the Memory (1938)
- "What Are You Doing New Year's Eve?" (written in 1947)

== Awards and legacy ==
Loesser received the 1951 Tony Award for Best Musical for his Guys and Dolls music and lyrics. He was nominated for the Tony Award for book, music and lyrics for The Most Happy Fella and as Best Composer for How to Succeed in Business Without Really Trying. Loesser was awarded a Grammy Award in 1962 for Best Original Cast Show Album for How to Succeed in Business Without Really Trying.

Loesser is regarded as one of the more talented writers of his era, noted for writing witty lyrics and clever musical devices. He also introduced a complex artistic style that challenged and shaped the compositional approach of Broadway musicals. He was also noted for using classical forms, such as imitative counterpoint (in the Fugue for Tinhorns in Guys and Dolls).

Loesser won the 1950 Academy Award for Best Original Song for "Baby, It's Cold Outside." He was nominated four more times:

"Dolores" from Las Vegas Nights (1941)
"They're Either Too Young or Too Old" from Thank Your Lucky Stars (1943)
"I Wish I Didn't Love You So" from The Perils of Pauline (1947) (a hit that year for both Vaughn Monroe and the film's star Betty Hutton)
"Thumbelina" from the movie musical Hans Christian Andersen (1953)

The PBS documentary Heart & Soul: The Life and Music of Frank Loesser was released in 2006.

42nd Street Moon's artistic director, Greg MacKellan, developed Once in Love with Loesser in 2013 as one of his musical tributes dedicated to exploring and celebrating the work of some of Broadway's great songwriters. The performance was built around the three stages of Loesser's career: Tin Pan Alley, Hollywood, and Broadway. Jason Graae performed "Once in Love with Amy" and "The King's New Clothes"; Emily Skinner sang Cleo's "Ooh! My Feet" and Rosabella's "Somebody, Somewhere" (from The Most Happy Fella); Ashley Jarrett performed "If I Were a Bell"; and Ian Leonard provided a tongue-in-cheek rendition of "Sing a Tropical Song".

Loesser, contrasted to his brother Arthur (1894-1969) in a humorous wordplay on the principle of "the lesser of two evils", was reportedly once referred to as "the evil of two Loessers". The two half-brothers died less than seven months apart in 1969.

== Sources ==
- Garraty, John A.; Carnes, Mark C., eds. (1988). Dictionary of American Biography, Supplement Eight: 1966–1970. ISBN 978-0684186184.
- Maiers, Claire D. (2009). Alfred W. Cramer (ed.). Musicians and Composers of the Twentieth Century. ISBN 978-1587655128.
