= Danny Kaye =

American actor and singer (1911–1987)

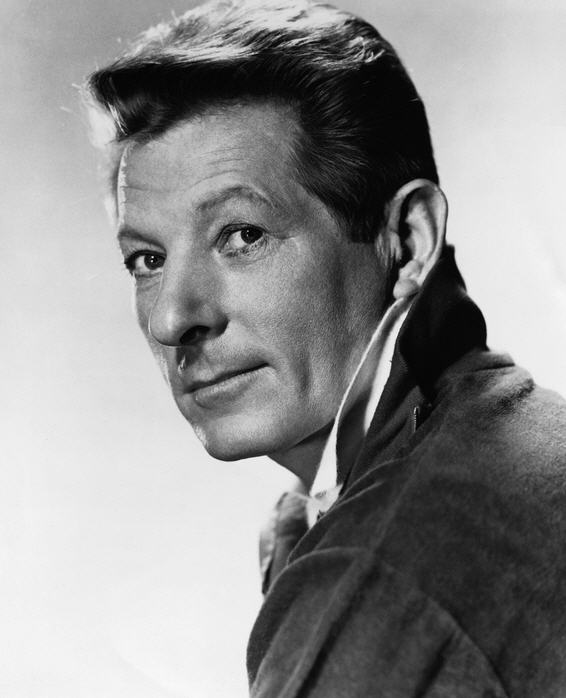
- Born: David Daniel Kaminsky; January 18, 1911; New York City, US
- Died: March 3, 1987 (aged 76); Los Angeles, California, US
- Occupations: Actor; comedian; singer; dancer; television presenter
- Years active: 1933–1987
- Spouse: Sylvia Fine (m. 1940)
- Children: 1

Danny Kaye (born David Daniel Kaminsky; January 18, 1911 – March 3, 1987) was an American actor, dancer, singer and comedian. His performances featured physical comedy, idiosyncratic pantomimes, and rapid-fire novelty songs.

Kaye starred in 23 films, notably Wonder Man (1945), The Kid from Brooklyn (1946), The Secret Life of Walter Mitty (1947), The Inspector General (1949), Hans Christian Andersen (1952), White Christmas (1954), and The Court Jester (1955). His films were popular, especially for his performances of patter songs and favorites such as "Inchworm" and "The Ugly Duckling".

He was the first ambassador-at-large of UNICEF in 1954 and received the French Legion of Honor in 1986 for his years of work with the organization.

== Early life and education ==
David Daniel Kaminsky was born in Brooklyn, New York, on January 18, 1911 (though he would later say 1913), to Russian Jewish immigrants Jacob and Clara (née Nemerovsky) Kaminsky. He was the youngest of three sons. His parents and older brothers Larry and Mac left Yekaterinoslav (present-day Dnipro, Ukraine) two years before Danny's birth; he was their only son born in the United States.

He attended Public School 149 in East New York, Brooklyn (eventually renamed to honor him), where he began entertaining his classmates with songs and jokes. He attended Thomas Jefferson High School in Brooklyn, but he did not graduate.

His mother died when he was in his early teens. Not long after, Kaye and his friend Louis ran away to Florida. Kaye sang while Louis played the guitar, and the pair eked out a living for a while. When Kaye returned to New York, his father did not pressure him to return to school or work, giving his son the chance to mature and discover his abilities. Kaye said that as a young boy, he had wanted to be a surgeon, but the family could not afford medical education.

After leaving school, he held a succession of jobs as a soda jerk, auto insurance investigator, and office clerk. Most ended with his being fired. He lost the insurance job when he made an error that cost the insurance company $40,000 (approximately $800,000 in 2026 adjusted for inflation). A dentist who hired him to look after his office over lunch and run errands fired him when he found Kaye using his dental drill on the office woodwork. In 1939, Kaye met the same dentist's daughter, Sylvia Fine, at an audition, and in 1940, they eloped. He learned his trade in his teenaged years in the Catskills as a tummler (master of ceremonies) in the Borscht Belt.

Kaye's first break came in 1933 when he joined the Three Terpsichoreans, a vaudeville dance act. They opened in Utica, New York, where he used the stage name Danny Kaye for the first time. The act toured the United States and in Asia with the show La Vie Paree. The troupe left for a six-month tour of Asia on February 8, 1934. During its stay in Osaka, Japan, a typhoon hit the city. The troupe's hotel suffered heavy damage. The strong wind hurled a piece of the hotel's cornice into Kaye's room. By evening's performance time, the city was in the grip of the storm. With no power, the audience became restless and nervous. To calm them, Kaye went on stage holding a flashlight to illuminate his face and sang every song he could recall as loudly as he was able.

The experience of trying to entertain audiences who did not speak English inspired him to do the pantomime gestures, songs, and facial expressions that eventually made his reputation. Sometimes, he found them necessary when ordering a meal. Kaye's daughter Dena relates a story her father told about being in a restaurant in China and trying to order chicken. Kaye flapped his arms and clucked, giving the waiter an imitation of a chicken. The waiter nodded in understanding, bringing Kaye two eggs. His interest in cooking began on the tour.

Jobs were in short supply when Kaye returned to the United States, and he struggled for bookings. One job was working in a burlesque revue with fan dancer Sally Rand. After the dancer dropped a fan while trying to chase away a fly, Kaye was hired to watch the fans, so they were always held in front of her. By 1937 he was working in the Catskills under the name Danny Kolbin.

== Comedy star ==
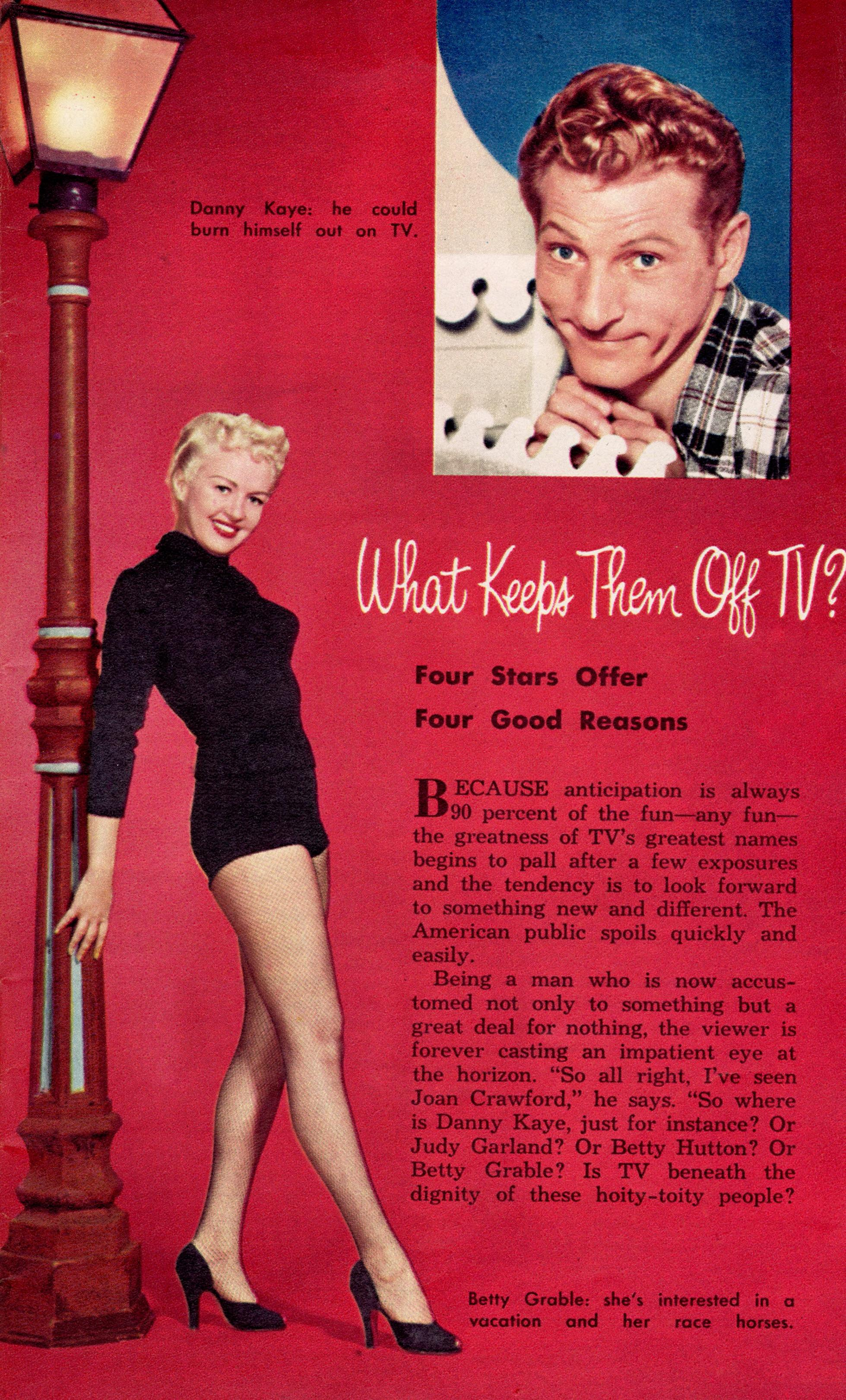
Kaye and Betty Grable in TV Guide, October 23, 1953

=== Educational Pictures ===
In 1937 Danny Kaye signed with New York-based Educational Pictures for a series of two-reel comedies. Now billed as "Danny Kaye", he established himself in support of character comic Imogene Coca. He was then elevated to co-starring roles (opposite mild-mannered comic Charles Kemper) and then starring roles, sometimes playing a manic, dark-haired, fast-talking Russian. One of his leading ladies at Educational was the young June Allyson. The Kaye series ended abruptly when the studio shut down production at the end of 1937; Kaye had already left the studio behind when his last two shorts, Cupid Takes a Holiday and Money on Your Life, were released in 1938. Years later, after Kaye became a major comedy star, producer Robert M. Savini cashed in by compiling three of Kaye's Educational shorts into a four-reel featurette, The Birth of a Star (1944).

=== Return to the stage ===
His next venture was a short-lived Broadway show with Sylvia Fine as the pianist, lyricist, and composer. The Straw Hat Revue opened on September 29, 1939, and closed after 10 weeks, but critics noticed Kaye's work. The reviews brought an offer for both Kaye and his bride Sylvia to work at La Martinique, a New York City nightclub. Kaye performed with Sylvia as his accompanist. At La Martinique, playwright Moss Hart saw Danny perform, and that led to Hart's casting him in his hit Broadway comedy Lady in the Dark.

In 1941, aged 30, Kaye scored a triumph playing Russell Paxton in Lady in the Dark, starring Gertrude Lawrence. His show-stopping number was "Tschaikowsky (and Other Russians)" by Kurt Weill and Ira Gershwin in which he sang the names of a string of Russian composers at breakneck speed, seemingly without taking a breath. In the next Broadway season, he was the star of a show about a young man who is drafted called Let's Face It!.

=== Hollywood fame ===
His feature-film début was in producer Samuel Goldwyn's Technicolor 1944 comedy Up in Arms, a remake of Goldwyn's Eddie Cantor comedy Whoopee! (1930). Studio mogul Goldwyn wanted Kaye's prominent nose fixed to look less Jewish; Kaye refused, but he did allow his red hair to be bleached blond, apparently because it looked better in Technicolor.

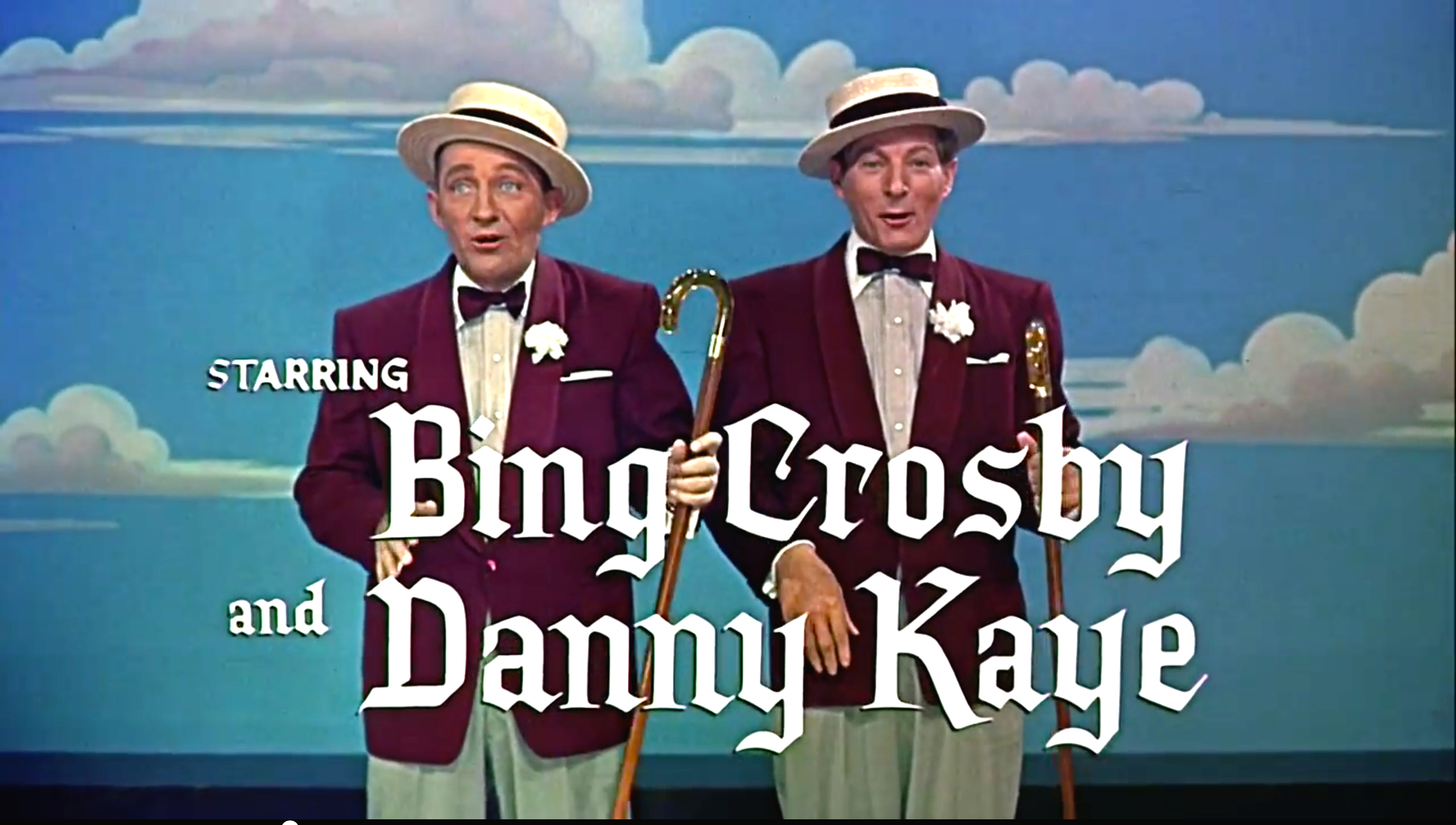
White Christmas trailer

Kaye starred in a radio program, The Danny Kaye Show, on CBS from 1945 to 1946. The program's popularity rose quickly. Within a year, he tied with Jimmy Durante for fifth place in the Radio Daily popularity poll. Kaye was asked to participate in a USO tour following the end of World War II. It meant that he would be absent from his radio show for nearly two months at the beginning of the season. Kaye's friends filled in with a different guest host each week. Kaye was the first American actor to visit postwar Tokyo. He had toured there some ten years before with the vaudeville troupe. When Kaye asked to be released from his radio contract in mid-1946, he agreed not to accept a regular radio show for one year and only limited guest appearances on other radio programs. Many of the show's episodes survive today, notable for Kaye's opening signature patter ("Git gat gittle, giddle-di-ap, giddle-de-tommy, riddle de biddle de roop, da-reep, fa-san, skeedle de woo-da, fiddle de wada, reep!").

Kaye starred in several movies with actress Virginia Mayo in the 1940s, and is known for films such as The Secret Life of Walter Mitty (1947), The Inspector General (1949), On the Riviera (1951) co-starring Gene Tierney, Knock on Wood (1954), White Christmas (1954), The Court Jester (1956), Me and the Colonel (1958), and Merry Andrew (1958). Kaye starred in two pictures based on biographies, Hans Christian Andersen (1952) about the Danish storyteller and The Five Pennies (1959) about jazz pioneer Red Nichols. His wife, writer/lyricist Sylvia Fine, wrote many of the tongue-twisting songs for which Kaye became famous. She was also an associate film producer. Some of Kaye's films included the theme of doubles, two people who look identical (both played by him) being mistaken for each other to comic effect.

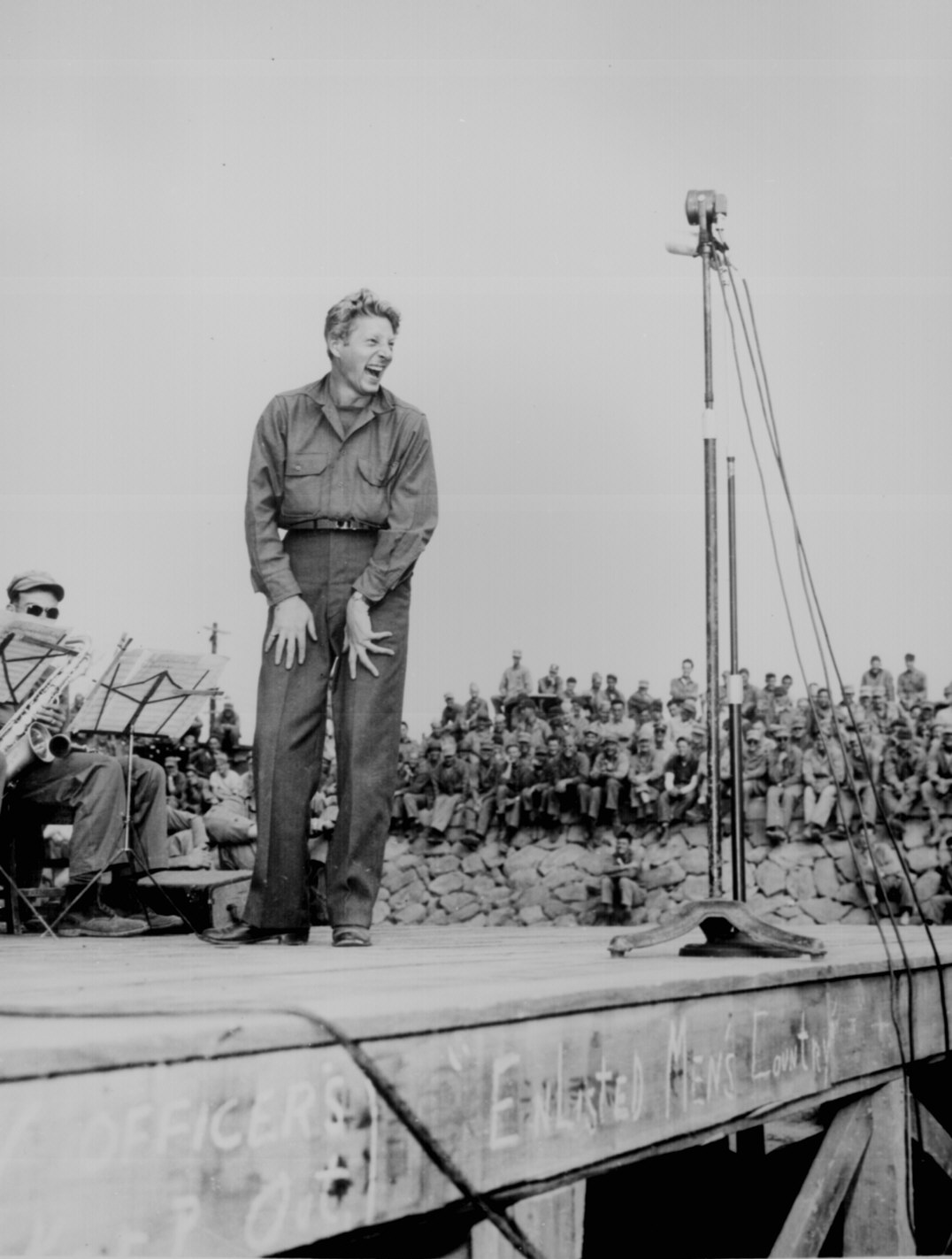
Danny Kaye on USO tour at Sasebo, Japan, October 25, 1945. Kaye and his friend, Dodgers manager Leo Durocher, made the trip.

While his wife wrote most of Kaye's material, he created much of it himself, often while performing. Kaye had one character he never shared with the public; Kaplan, the owner of a rubber company, came to life only for family and friends. His wife, Sylvia, described the Kaplan character:

He doesn't have any first name. Even his wife calls him just Kaplan. He's an illiterate, pompous character who advertises his philanthropies. Jack Benny or Dore Schary might say, "Kaplan, why do you hate unions so?" If Danny feels like doing Kaplan that night, he might be off on Kaplan for two hours.

When he appeared at the London Palladium in 1948, he "roused the Royal family to laughter and was the first of many performers who have turned British variety into an American preserve." Life described his reception as "worshipful hysteria" and noted that the royal family, for the first time, left the royal box to watch from the front row of the orchestra. He related that he had no idea of the familial connections when the Marquess of Milford Haven introduced himself after a show and said he would like his cousins to see Kaye perform. Kaye stated he never returned to the venue because no way existed to recreate the magic of that time. Kaye had an invitation to return to London for a Royal Variety Performance in November of the same year. When the invitation arrived, Kaye was busy with The Inspector General (which had a working title of Happy Times). Warner Bros. stopped the film to allow their star to attend. When his Decca labelmates The Andrews Sisters began their engagement at the London Palladium on the heels of Kaye's successful 1948 appearance there, the trio was well received and David Lewin of the Daily Express declared: "The audience gave the Andrews Sisters the Danny Kaye roar!"

He hosted the 24th Academy Awards in 1952. The program was broadcast on radio; telecasts of the Oscar ceremony started the very following year, in 1953. During the 1950s, Kaye visited Australia, where he played Buttons in a production of Cinderella in Sydney. In 1953, Kaye started a production company, Dena Pictures, named for his daughter. Knock on Wood was the first film produced by his firm. The firm expanded into television in 1960 under the name Belmont Television.

=== Television ===
Kaye entered television in 1956, on the CBS show See It Now with Edward R. Murrow. The Secret Life of Danny Kaye combined his 50,000-mile, ten-country tour as UNICEF ambassador with music and humor. His first solo effort was in 1960 with a one-hour special produced by Sylvia and sponsored by General Motors, with similar specials in 1961 and 1962.

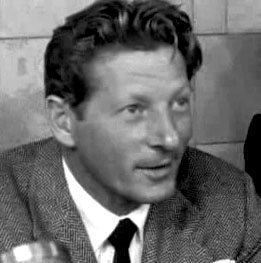
Kaye at Schiphol on October 5, 1955

He hosted The Danny Kaye Show from 1963 to 1967; it won four Emmy awards and a Peabody award. His last cinematic starring role came in 1963's The Man from the Diners' Club.

Beginning in 1964, he acted as television host to the CBS telecasts of MGM's The Wizard of Oz. Kaye did a stint as a What's My Line? mystery guest on the Sunday-night CBS-TV quiz program. Kaye was later a guest panelist on that show. He also appeared on the interview program Here's Hollywood. In the 1970s, Kaye tore a ligament in his leg during the run of the Richard Rodgers musical Two by Two, but went on with the show, appearing with his leg in a cast and cavorting on stage in a wheelchair. He had done much the same on his television show in 1964, when his right leg and foot were burned from a cooking accident. Camera shots were planned so television viewers did not see Kaye in his wheelchair.

In 1976, he played Geppetto in a television musical adaptation of Pinocchio with Sandy Duncan in the title role. Kaye portrayed Captain Hook opposite Mia Farrow in a musical version of Peter Pan featuring songs by Anthony Newley and Leslie Bricusse. He later guest-starred in episodes of The Muppet Show and The Cosby Show, and in the 1980s revival The Twilight Zone.

In many films, as well as on stage, Kaye proved to be an able actor, singer, dancer, and comedian. He showed his serious side as ambassador for UNICEF and in his dramatic role in the memorable TV film Skokie, when he played a Holocaust survivor. Kaye conducted an orchestra during a comical series of concerts organized for UNICEF fundraising.

In 1980, Kaye hosted and sang in the 25th anniversary of Disneyland celebration and hosted the opening celebration for Epcot in 1982 (EPCOT Center at the time). Both were aired on primetime television in the United States.

=== Career in music ===
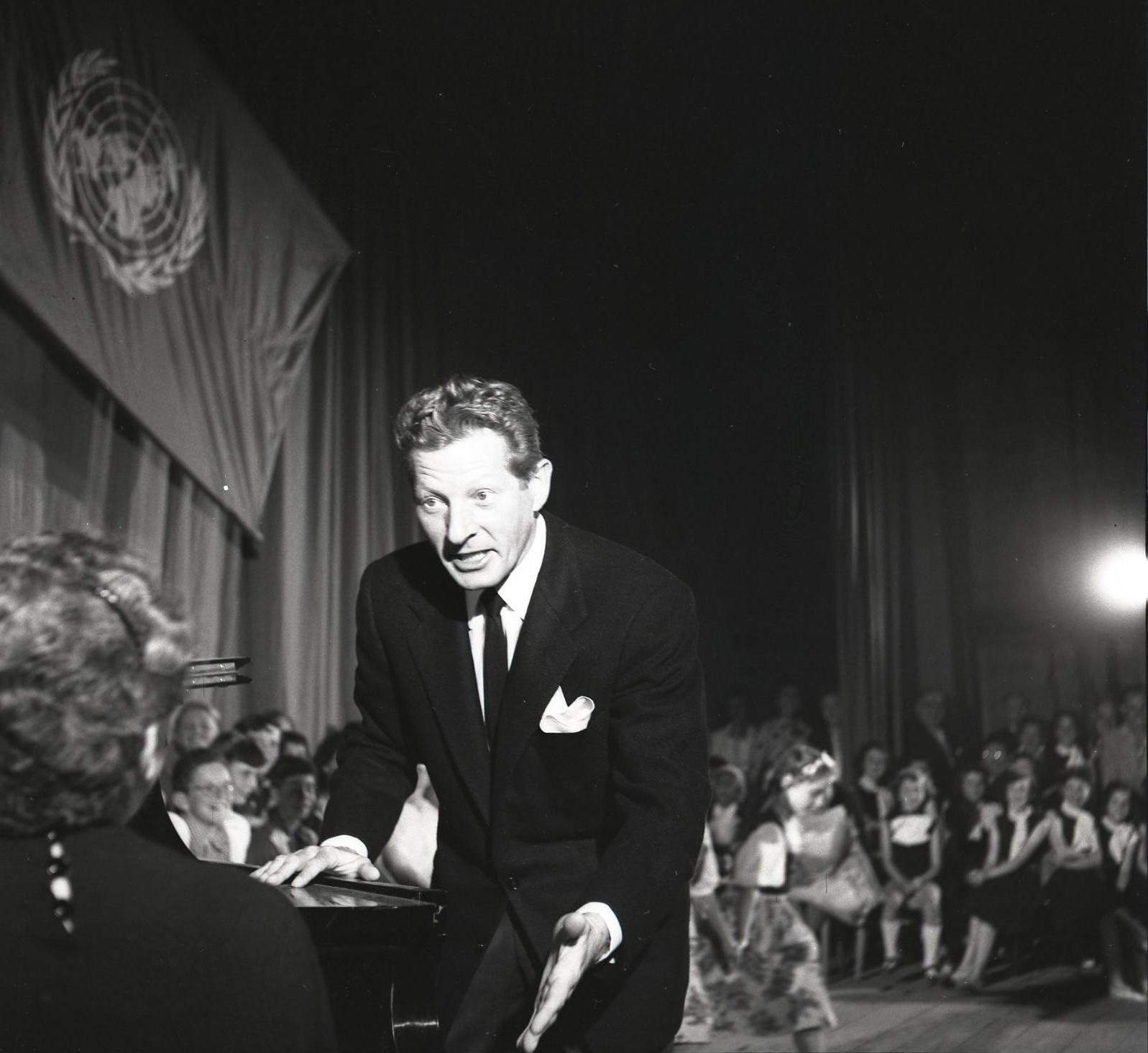
Kaye during his visit to Israel, 1956, Boris Carmi, Meitar collection, National Library of Israel

While Kaye claimed he could not read music, he was said to have perfect pitch. A flamboyant performer with his own distinctive style, "easily adapting from outrageous novelty songs to tender ballads" (according to critic Jason Ankeny), in 1945, Kaye began hosting his own CBS radio program, in which he performed a number of hit songs, including "Dinah" and "Minnie the Moocher".

In 1947, Kaye teamed up with The Andrews Sisters (Patty, Maxene, and LaVerne) on Decca Records, producing the number-three Billboard hit "Civilization (Bongo, Bongo, Bongo)". The success of the pairing prompted both acts to record through 1950, producing such rhythmically comical fare as "The Woody Woodpecker Song" (based on the bird from the Walter Lantz cartoons and a Billboard hit for the quartet), "Put 'em in a Box, Tie 'em with a Ribbon (And Throw 'em in the Deep Blue Sea)", "The Big Brass Band from Brazil", "It's a Quiet Town (In Crossbone County)", "Amelia Cordelia McHugh (Mc Who?)", "Ching-a-ra-sa-sa", and a duet by Danny and Patty Andrews of "Orange Colored Sky". The acts teamed for two yuletide favorites—a frantic, harmonic rendition of "A Merry Christmas at Grandmother's House (Over the River and Through the Woods)" and a duet by Danny and Patty, "All I Want for Christmas Is My Two Front Teeth".

Kaye's début album, Columbia Presents Danny Kaye, had been released in 1942 by Columbia Records with songs performed to the accompaniment of Maurice Abravanel and Johnny Green. The album was reissued as a Columbia LP in 1949 and is described by the critic Bruce Eder as "a bit tamer than some of the stuff that Kaye hit with later in the '40s and in the '50s, and for reasons best understood by the public, doesn't attract nearly the interest of his kids' records and overt comedy routines".

In 1950, a Decca single, "I've Got a Lovely Bunch of Coconuts", was released, and became another chart hit for him. His second Columbia LP album Danny Kaye Entertains (1953, Columbia) included five songs recorded in 1941 from his Broadway musical Lady in the Dark, most notably "Tschaikowsky (and Other Russians)".

Following the success of the film Hans Christian Andersen (1952), two of its songs written by Frank Loesser and sung by Kaye, "Thumbelina" and "Wonderful Copenhagen", reached the charts; the former title became a minor US hit, and the latter reached number five on the UK singles chart. In 1953, Decca released Danny at the Palace, a live recording made at the New York Palace Theater, followed by Knock On Wood (Decca, 1954) a set of songs from the movie of the same name sung by Kaye, accompanied by Victor Young and His Singing Strings.

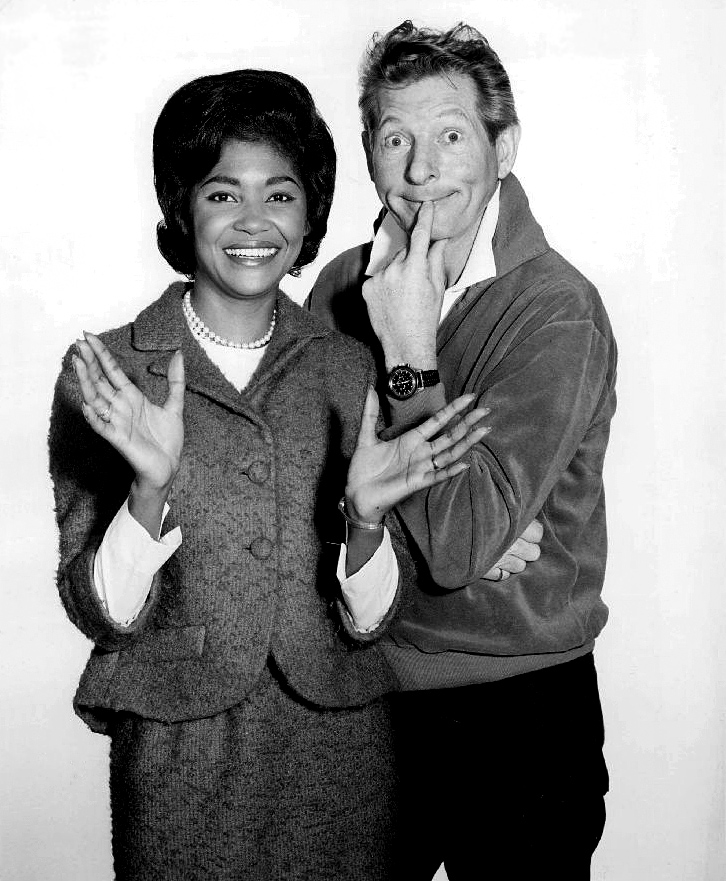
Singer Nancy Wilson appearing on his show in 1965

In 1956, Kaye signed a three-year recording contract with Capitol Records, which released his single "Love Me Do" in December of that year. The B-side, "Ciu Ciu Bella", with lyrics written by Sylvia Fine, was inspired by an episode in Rome when Kaye, on a mission for UNICEF, befriended a 7-year-old child with polio in a children's hospital, who sang this song for him in Italian.

In 1958, Saul Chaplin and Johnny Mercer wrote songs for Merry Andrew, a film starring Kaye as a British teacher attracted to the circus. The score added up to six numbers, all sung by Kaye; conductor Billy May's 1950 composition "Bozo's Circus Band" (renamed "Music of the Big Top Circus Band") was deposited on the second side of the Merry Andrew soundtrack, released in 1958. A year later, another soundtrack came out, for The Five Pennies (in which Kaye starred as 1920s cornet player Red Nichols), featuring Louis Armstrong.

In the 1960s and 1970s, Kaye regularly conducted world-famous orchestras, although he had to learn the scores by ear. Kaye's style, even if accompanied by unpredictable antics (he once traded the baton for a flyswatter to conduct "The Flight of the Bumblebee") was praised by the likes of Zubin Mehta, who once stated that Kaye "has a very efficient conducting style". His ability with an orchestra was mentioned by Dimitri Mitropoulos, then conductor of the New York Philharmonic Orchestra. After Kaye's appearance, Mitropoulos remarked, "Here is a man who is not musically trained, who cannot even read music and he gets more out of my orchestra than I have." Kaye was invited to conduct symphonies as charity fundraisers and was the conductor of the all-city marching band at the season opener of the Los Angeles Dodgers in 1984. Over his career, he raised over US$5 million in support of musician pension funds.

=== Recognition ===
Kaye received two Academy Awards – an Academy Honorary Award in 1955 and the Jean Hersholt Humanitarian Award in 1982. That year, he received the Screen Actors Guild annual award.

=== Imitations ===
Kaye was sufficiently popular to inspire imitations:

- The 1946 Warner Bros. cartoon Book Revue had a sequence with Daffy Duck wearing a blond wig and impersonating Kaye.
- Satirical songwriter Tom Lehrer's 1953 song "Lobachevsky" was based on a number that Kaye had done, about the Russian director Constantin Stanislavski, with the affected Russian accent. Lehrer mentioned Kaye in an opening monologue, citing him as an "idol since childbirth".
- Superman creators Jerry Siegel and Joe Shuster fashioned a short-lived superhero title, Funnyman, taking inspiration from Kaye's persona.

== Other endeavors ==
=== Cooking ===
Kaye was a skilled chef, specializing in Chinese and Italian cooking. A custom-made Chinese restaurant was built in the rear of his house with a professional kitchen attached to it. The stove that Kaye used for his Chinese dishes was fitted with metal rings for the burners to allow the heat to be highly concentrated, and a trough with circulating ice water cooled the area to keep the intense heat tolerable for those who were cooking. He learned "at Johnny Kan's restaurant in San Francisco and with Cecilia Chang at her Mandarin restaurants in San Francisco and Los Angeles". He taught Chinese cooking classes at a San Francisco Chinese restaurant in the 1970s. The theatre and demonstration kitchen under the library at the Hyde Park, New York, campus of the Culinary Institute of America is named for him.

Kaye referred to his kitchen as "Ying's Thing". While filming The Madwoman of Chaillot in France, he phoned home to ask his family if they would like to eat at Ying's Thing that evening; Kaye flew home for dinner. Not all of his efforts in the kitchen went well. After flying to San Francisco for a recipe for sourdough bread, he came home and spent hours preparing loaves. When his daughter asked about the bread, Kaye hit the bread on the kitchen table; his bread was hard enough to chip it. Kaye approached kitchen work with enthusiasm, making sausages and other foods needed for his cuisine. Though it is often claimed that he was a Meilleur Ouvrier de France (MOF), this is not true, as the MOF is restricted to French professionals. Rather, he had cooked for several famous French chefs at his house (all of them MOFs), and they signed an "honorary" Meilleur Ouvrier de France diploma for him.

=== Flying ===
Kaye was an aviation enthusiast and licensed pilot. His interest in flying was sparked by his longtime friend choreographer Michael Kidd, who at the time had recently earned his private pilot's license. Kaye was also an enthusiastic and accomplished golfer, but reduced his golf activities in favor of flying and began training for his license in 1959. The first plane Kaye owned was a Piper Aztec. After this, he became qualified for many types of aircraft, from single-engined light aircraft to multiengine jets.

Kaye received a type rating in a Learjet, and he was named an honorary vice president of the Learjet Company by Bill Lear (he had no line responsibility at the company). He supported many flying projects; in 1968, Kaye was named honorary chairman of the Las Vegas International Exposition of Flight, a show that used many facets of the city's entertainment industry while presenting an air show. The operational show chairman was well-known aviation figure Lynn Garrison. Kaye flew a Learjet to 65 cities in five days on a mission to help UNICEF.

=== Business ventures ===
In 1958, Kaye and partner Lester Smith formed Kaye–Smith Enterprises. The company owned a chain of radio stations, mostly in the Pacific Northwest. Other Kaye–Smith divisions included a concert-promotion company, a video-production company, and a recording studio.

=== Baseball ===
A lifelong Dodgers fan, Kaye recorded a song called "D-O-D-G-E-R-S (Oh, Really? No, O'Malley!)", describing a fictitious encounter with the San Francisco Giants, a hit during the real-life pennant chase of 1962. That song is included on Baseball's Greatest Hits compact discs. A good friend of Leo Durocher's, he often traveled with the team. He also possessed an encyclopedic knowledge of the game and was an accomplished second baseman.

Kaye and his business partner Lester Smith also led an investment group, which was awarded the American League's 13th franchise, which became the Seattle Mariners for US$6.2 million on February 7, 1976. After four season, the ownership percentages of Kaye, Smith, and two other remaining original investors were reduced to 5% each when George Argyros purchased 80% of the Mariners for $10.4 million on January 30, 1981. Kaye sold all of his business interests to Smith's family in 1985. The Mariners never had a winning record while Kaye owned a stake in the club.

=== Medicine ===
Kaye was an honorary member of the American College of Surgeons and the American Academy of Pediatrics.

=== Charity ===
Danny Kaye on a promotion tour for UNICEF in the Netherlands, 1955

Working alongside UNICEF's Halloween fundraiser founder, Ward Simon Kimball Jr., Kaye educated the public on impoverished children in deplorable living conditions overseas, and assisted in the distribution of donated goods and funds. His involvement with UNICEF came about in an unusual way. Kaye was flying home from London in 1949 when one of the plane's four engines lost its propeller and caught fire. The problem was initially thought serious enough that it might make an ocean landing; life jackets and life rafts were made ready. The plane was able to head back over 500 miles (804.67 km) to land at Shannon Airport, Ireland. On the way back to Shannon, the head of the Children's Fund, Maurice Pate, had the seat next to Danny Kaye and spoke at length about the need for recognition for the fund. Their discussion continued on the flight from Shannon to New York; it was the beginning of the actor's long association with UNICEF.

"For all of his success as a performer (...) his greatest legacy remains his tireless humanitarian work—so close were his ties to the United Nations International Children's Emergency Fund (UNICEF) that when the organization received the Nobel Peace Prize, Kaye was tapped to accept it", according to music critic Jason Ankeny.

Proud of his Jewish heritage, he frequently visited Israel as part of tribute and solidarity missions. During the Yom Kippur War in 1973, he visited many wounded Israeli soldiers in hospitals. He also conducted the Israeli Philharmonic Orchestra several times in charity concerts.

== Personal life ==
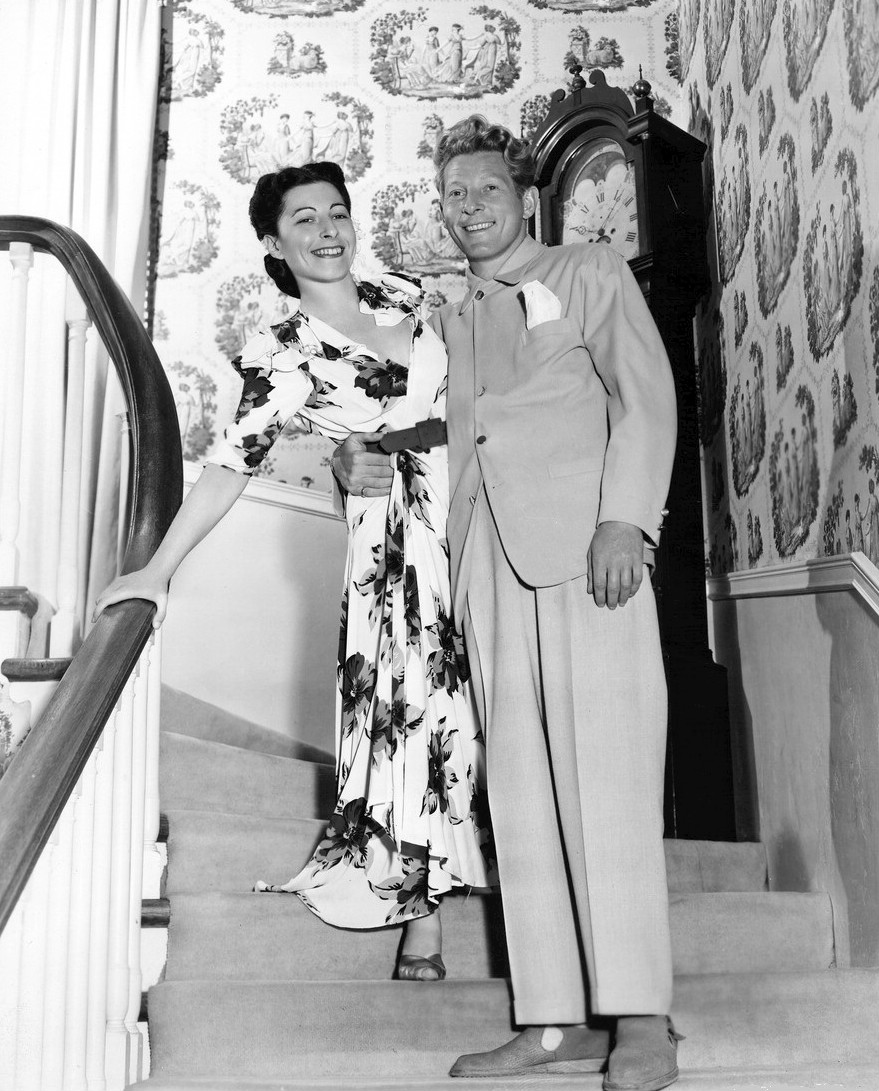
Sylvia and Kaye, 1945

Kaye and Sylvia Fine grew up in Brooklyn, living a few blocks apart, but they did not meet until they were working on an off-Broadway show in 1939. Sylvia was an audition pianist.

Sylvia discovered that Kaye had worked for her father Samuel Fine, a dentist. Kaye, working in Florida, proposed on the telephone; they were married in Fort Lauderdale on January 3, 1940. They were married until Kaye's death in 1987, except for a separation in 1947 and 1948, when Kaye was involved in an affair with actress Eve Arden.

The couple's only child, daughter Dena, was born on December 17, 1946. When she was very young, Dena did not like seeing her father perform because she did not understand why people were laughing at what he did. Kaye said in a 1954 interview, "Whatever she wants to be she will be without interference from her mother nor from me." Dena grew up to become a journalist.

Donald Spoto, the author of Laurence Olivier (HarperCollins), made an unsubstantiated claim that Kaye had a 10-year secret affair with Laurence Olivier. Despite rumors and speculation on social media since that book's publication, no evidence has been published. English journalist Terry Coleman, who spent four years studying Olivier's archive of letters and memorabilia, could not find evidence of such an affair between Kaye and Olivier. Coleman observed, "I did check it and talked to a number of people. In this mountain of material in the archives, I could not find a hint of an affair with Danny Kaye."

On January 18, 2013, during a 24-hour salute to Kaye on Turner Classic Movies in celebration of what TCM thought was his 100th birthday, Kaye's daughter Dena revealed to TCM host Ben Mankiewicz that Kaye's stated birth year of 1913 was incorrect, and that he was actually born in 1911.

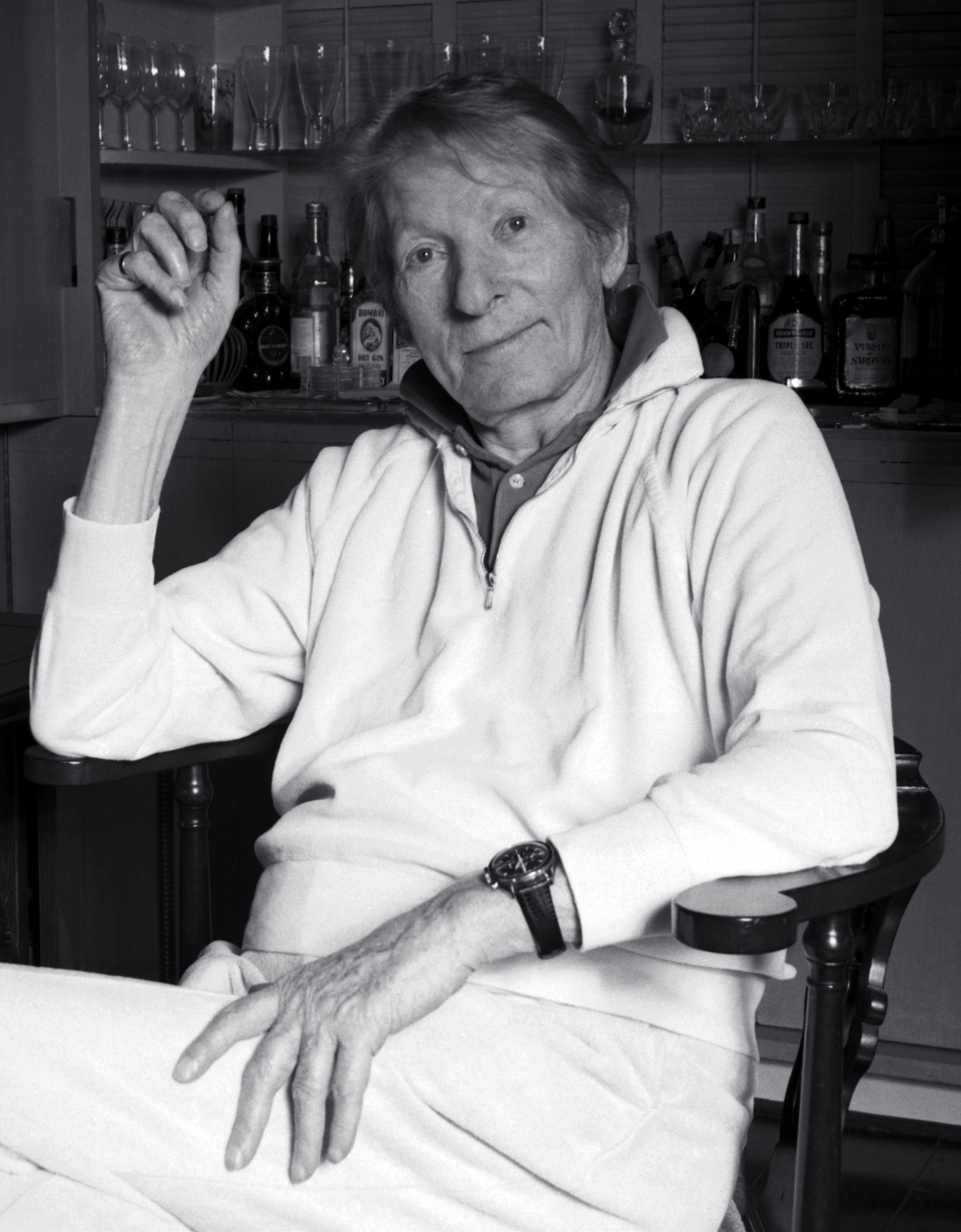
Kaye in 1986 by Allan Warren

Kaye was the godfather of actress Mary Louise Weller.

=== Health and death ===
In 1983, Kaye had quadruple bypass heart surgery and contracted hepatitis C from a blood transfusion. He died at Cedars-Sinai Medical Center in the early morning hours of March 3, 1987, aged 76, from complications of heart failure, internal bleeding, and hepatitis C.

== Legacy ==
Kaye's body was cremated and his ashes were interred in the foundation of a bench in Kensico Cemetery in Valhalla, New York. His grave is adorned with a bench that contains friezes of a baseball and bat, an aircraft, a piano, a flowerpot, musical notes, and a chef's toque. His name and birth and death dates are inscribed on the toque. The United Nations held a memorial tribute to him at its New York headquarters on the evening of October 21, 1987.

The Sylvia and Danny Kaye Playhouse at Hunter College in New York was opened in 1988, with a $1 million gift from Sylvia Kaye.

David Koenig reflects, "His legacy has dimmed with the passage of time. His greatest works [...] endure today only as memories in the minds of aging members of his audiences [...] much of his TV work has not aged particularly well. Whimsy was of another time." However, Koenig sees Kaye's film work in a different light, "History has smiled on individual pictures—in particular the holiday staple of White Christmas and The Court Jester... the medieval romp has steadily gained a reputation as one of the greatest comedies of all time."

Comedian George Carlin idolized Kaye and wanted to be just like him, and although he eventually realized he wasn't as good an actor as Kaye was, he constantly referred to his sad realization of not being able to attain his boyhood dream of being like Kaye. But near the end of his life, he took more acting roles as he never really gave up on the dream.

== Honors ==

- Kaye was knighted by Queen Margrethe II of Denmark on November 10, 1983. He was awarded the cross of the Knight of the Dannebrog, 1st Class, for his work with UNICEF and longstanding ties with Denmark. Kaye portrayed Hans Christian Andersen in the 1952 film of the same name.
- Chevalier of the French Legion of Honor on February 24, 1986, for his work for UNICEF.
- On June 23, 1987, Kaye was posthumously presented with the Presidential Medal of Freedom by President Ronald Reagan. The award was received by his daughter Dena.
- In 1988, Kaye was posthumously inducted into the American Theater Hall of Fame.
- UNICEF created the Danny Kaye International Children's Award in his honor, a children's European singing competition shown every year between 1988 and 1992 hosted by Audrey Hepburn and Roger Moore.

=== Awards and other recognition ===
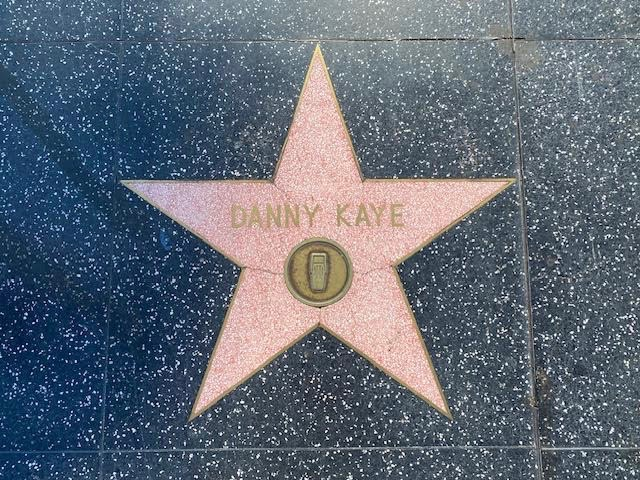
Kaye's star on the Hollywood Walk of Fame for his achievements in radio

- Golden Globe Award for Best Actor – Motion Picture Musical or Comedy in 1951, for On the Riviera
- Special Tony Award (1953).
- Received an honorary Academy Award Oscar in 1955 "for his unique talents, his service to the Academy, the motion picture industry, and the American people".
- Golden Globe Award for Best Actor – Motion Picture Musical or Comedy in 1958, for Me and the Colonel
- Lions Clubs International The first recipient of the Lions Clubs International Foundation's Humanitarian Award. (1973–74)
- Jean Hersholt Humanitarian Award (1981)
- Asteroid 6546 Kaye
- Three stars on the Hollywood Walk of Fame; for his work in music, radio, and films
- Kennedy Center Honor (1984)
- Grand marshal of the Tournament of Roses Parade (1984)
- The song "I Wish I Was Danny Kaye" on Miracle Legion's 1996 album Portrait of a Damaged Family
- UNICEF's New York Visitor's Centre is named to honor Danny Kaye.
- In December 1996, the PBS series American Masters aired a special on Kaye's life.
- In San Antonio, Texas named a street in the neighborhood Oak Hills Terrace (located in the city's northwest) is named for Danny Kaye near streets bearing other familiar names from TV and movies. The neighborhood was established in the late 1960s.
- The careers of Kaye and Fine are immortalized in The Danny Kaye and Sylvia Fine Collection at the Library of Congress. The materials preserved in the collection include manuscripts, scores, scripts, photographs, sound recordings, and video clips.
- On June 9, 1986, Kaye was crowned King of Brooklyn at the Back to Brooklyn Day Festival. Kaye was there to accept his crown.

== Filmography ==
=== Film ===
Title	Year	Role	Director	Co-stars	Filmed in
Dime a Dance	1937	Eddie	Al Christie	Imogene Coca, June Allyson	Black and white short subjects for Educational Pictures
Getting an Eyeful	1938	Russian	Al Christie	Charles Kemper, Sally Starr	Black and white short subjects for Educational Pictures
Cupid Takes a Holiday	1938	Nikolai Nikolaevich	William Watson	Douglas Leavitt, Estelle Jayne	Black and white short subjects for Educational Pictures
Money on Your Life	1938	Nikolai Nikolaevich	William Watson	Charles Kemper, Sally Starr	Black and white short subjects for Educational Pictures
Up in Arms	1944	Danny Weems	Elliott Nugent	Dinah Shore, Dana Andrews	Technicolor, for Samuel Goldwyn
I Am an American	1944	Himself	Crane Wilbur	Humphrey Bogart, Gary Gray, Dick Haymes, Joan Leslie, Dennis Morgan, Knute Rockne, Jay Silverheels	Black and white short subject for Warner Bros.
Wonder Man	1945	Edwin Dingle/Buzzy Bellew	H. Bruce Humberstone	Virginia Mayo, Vera-Ellen, Steve Cochran	Technicolor, for Samuel Goldwyn
The Kid from Brooklyn	1946	Burleigh Hubert Sullivan	Norman Z. McLeod	Virginia Mayo, Vera-Ellen, Steve Cochran, Eve Arden	Technicolor, for Samuel Goldwyn
The Secret Life of Walter Mitty	1947	Walter Mitty	Norman Z. McLeod	Virginia Mayo, Boris Karloff, Fay Bainter, Ann Rutherford	Technicolor, for Samuel Goldwyn
A Song Is Born	1948	Professor Hobart Frisbee	Howard Hawks	Virginia Mayo, Benny Goodman, Hugh Herbert, Steve Cochran	Technicolor, for Samuel Goldwyn
It's a Great Feeling	1949	Himself	David Butler	Dennis Morgan, Doris Day, Jack Carson	Technicolor, for Warner Bros.
The Inspector General	1949	Georgi	Henry Koster	Walter Slezak, Barbara Bates, Elsa Lanchester, Gene Lockhart	Technicolor, for Warner Bros.
On the Riviera	1951	Jack Martin/Henri Duran	Walter Lang	Gene Tierney, Corinne Calvet	Technicolor, for 20th Century-Fox
Hans Christian Andersen	1952	Hans Christian Andersen	Charles Vidor	Farley Granger, Zizi Jeanmaire	Technicolor, for Goldwyn
Knock on Wood	1954	Jerry Morgan/Papa Morgan	Norman Panama; Melvin Frank	Mai Zetterling, Torin Thatcher	Technicolor, for Paramount Pictures
White Christmas	1954	Phil Davis	Michael Curtiz	Bing Crosby, Rosemary Clooney, Vera-Ellen, Dean Jagger	VistaVision and Technicolor, for Paramount
The Court Jester	1956	Hubert Hawkins	Norman Panama; Melvin Frank	Glynis Johns, Basil Rathbone, Angela Lansbury	VistaVision and Technicolor, for Paramount
Merry Andrew	1958	Andrew Larabee	Michael Kidd	Salvatore Baccaloni, Pier Angeli	CinemaScope and Metrocolor, for Metro-Goldwyn-Mayer
Me and the Colonel	1958	Samuel L. Jacobowsky	Peter Glenville	Curt Jürgens, Nicole Maurey, Françoise Rosay, Akim Tamiroff	Black and white, for Columbia Pictures
The Five Pennies	1959	Red Nichols	Melville Shavelson	Barbara Bel Geddes, Louis Armstrong, Tuesday Weld	VistaVision and Technicolor, for Paramount
On the Double	1961	Private First Class Ernie Williams/General Sir Lawrence MacKenzie-Smith	Melville Shavelson	Dana Wynter, Margaret Rutherford, Diana Dors	Panavision and Technicolor, for Paramount
The Man from the Diners' Club	1963	Ernest Klenk	Frank Tashlin	Cara Williams, Martha Hyer	Black and white, for Columbia
The Madwoman of Chaillot	1969	The Ragpicker	Bryan Forbes	Katharine Hepburn, Charles Boyer	Technicolor, for Warner Bros.

=== Television ===
- Autumn Laughter (1938) (experimental telecast)
- The Secret Life of Danny Kaye (1956) (See It Now special)
- What's My Line? (1960) (celebrity mystery guest)
- An Hour With Danny Kaye (1960 and 1961) (specials)
- The Danny Kaye Show with Lucille Ball (1962) (special)
- The Danny Kaye Show (1963–1967) (series)
- The Lucy Show: "Lucy Meets Danny Kaye" (1964) (guest appearance)
- Rowan & Martin's Laugh-In (1970)
- Here Comes Peter Cottontail (1971) (voice)
- The Dick Cavett Show (1971) (interview guest)
- The Enchanted World of Danny Kaye: The Emperor's New Clothes (1972) (special)
- An Evening with John Denver (1975) (special)
- Pinocchio (1976) (CBS special); live-action television musical adaptation starring Kaye as Gepetto and Sandy Duncan in the title role
- Peter Pan (1976) (NBC special); live-action television musical adaptation starring Mia Farrow in the title role, and Kaye as Captain Hook
- The Muppet Show (1978) (guest appearance)
- Disneyland's 25th Anniversary (1980) (special guest appearance)
- An Evening with Danny Kaye (1981) (special)
- Skokie (1981) (television movie)
- "Epcot Center: The Opening Celebration" television special (1982) (host and conductor)
- The Twilight Zone: "Paladin of the Lost Hour" (1985) (guest appearance)
- The Cosby Show: "The Dentist" (1986) (guest appearance) (final role)

== Stage work ==
- The Straw Hat Revue (1939)
- Lady in the Dark (1941)
- Let's Face It! (1941)
- Two by Two (1970)

== Selected discography ==
=== Studio albums ===
- Danny Kaye (Decca, 1949)
- Gilbert And Sullivan And Danny Kaye (Decca, 1949)
- Danny Kaye Entertains (Columbia, 1950)
- Mommy, Gimme a Drinka Water (Orchestration by Gordon Jenkins) (Capitol, 1958)
- The Five Pennies (with Louis Armstrong, London, 1959)

=== Soundtracks ===
- Hans Christian Andersen (1952)
- Knock on Wood (Decca, 1954)
- Court Jester (Brunswick, 1956)
- Merry Andrew (1958)

=== Spoken word ===
- Danny Kaye for Children (Coral, 1959)
- Danny Kaye Tells 6 Stories from Faraway Places (Golden, 1960)

=== Compilations ===
- Selections from Irving Berlin's White Christmas (1954)
- The Best of Danny Kaye (Decca, 1965)
- Two by Two (Columbia, 1970)
- The Very Best of Danny Kaye (20 Golden Greats) (MCA, 1987)

=== Charting singles ===
- "Bloop Bleep" (With Orchestra Directed by Billy May, Decca) US No. 21, 1947
- "Civilization (Bongo, Bongo, Bongo)" from the Broadway musical Angel in the Wings (Danny Kaye – Andrews Sisters, with Vic Schoen and His Orchestra, Decca) US No. 3, 1947
- "The Woody Woodpecker" (Danny Kaye – Andrews Sisters, With The Harmonica Gentlemen, Decca) US No. 18, 1948
- "I've Got a Lovely Bunch of Coconuts" (With The Harmonaires And Orchestra Directed By Vic Schoen, Decca) US No. 26, 1950
- "C'est Si Bon (It's So Good)" (With Lee Gordon Singers And Vic Schoen And His Orchestra, Decca) US No. 21, 1950
- "Black Strap Molasses" (Danny Kaye – Jimmy Durante – Jane Wyman – Groucho Marx with 4 Hits and A Miss and Orchestra Directed by Sonny Burke, Decca) US No. 29, 1951
- "Thumbelina" (Danny Kaye and Gordon Jenkins and his Chorus and Orchestra, Decca) US No. 28, 1952
- "Wonderful Copenhagen" (Danny Kaye and Gordon Jenkins and his Chorus and Orchestra, Decca) UK No. 5, 1953
- "Little Child (Daddy Dear)" with Dena Kaye (Decca, 1956) US Cash Box No. 25
- "Ciu Ciu Bella" (Capitol, 1956) US Music Vendor No. 76
- "Lullaby in Ragtime" with Eileen Wilson (Dot, 1959) US Music Vendor No. 116
- "D-O-D-G-E-R-S Song (Oh, Really? No, O'Malley)" (Reprise, 1962) US Cash Box No. 113

== Sources ==
- , June 23, 1987. Retrieved March 9, 2015.
