= List of prime ministers of Canada by military service =

There are seven prime ministers of Canada with military service. Four prime ministers served with the sedentary militias or active militias of the Province of Canada, or the succeeding Canadian Confederation during the 19th century. Two served with the Canadian Expeditionary Force (CEF) during First World War. The last prime minister to serve in the military was Pierre Trudeau, who joined the Canadian Officers' Training Corps during the Second World War.

The prime ministers with military experience have only served with the land forces of Canada, the active militias/Canadian Army, (Note: The active militias refers to the regular army of the Province of Canada and Canada after confederation. In 1940, the active militias was renamed as the Canadian Army through an Order in Council.) or the CEF. No prime minister has served in the other branches of the Canadian Armed Forces: the Royal Canadian Air Force and Royal Canadian Navy. Lester B. Pearson is the only prime minister to serve in the British Army, having transferred to the Royal Flying Corps from the CEF.

In addition to military service, two prime ministers served as a defence minister prior to their premiership. Although John A. Macdonald was the first prime minister of confederated Canada, he previously served as the minister of militia and defence for the Province of Canada. Kim Campbell is the only prime minister to serve as prime minister, and simultaneously hold the defence portfolio (as the minister of national defence). (Note: The Department of National Defence absorbed the Department of Militia and Defence in 1921.)

The prime minister is not commander-in-chief of the Canadian Armed Forces, rather the role is held by the monarch of Canada and is held on behalf of the monarch by the governor general of Canada.

Prime Minister	Service	Rank	Active service
Sir John A. Macdonald	Sedentary militia	Private	Kingston during Upper Canada Rebellion 1837; Minister of Militia and Defence 1860-1867
Alexander Mackenzie	Active militia	Major	Fenian Raids; member of militia in Lambton, Ontario (1866–1874)
Sir John Joseph Caldwell Abbott	Active Militia	commanding officer (Lieutenant Colonel?)	Fenian Raids; officer of 11th Argenteuil Battalion militia in Montreal area (1866-1874?)
Sir John Sparrow David Thompson	none	none	none
Sir Mackenzie Bowell	Active militia	Lieutenant Colonel	Canadian militia posted along the border during the American Civil War and Fenian Raids; member of 49th (Hastings) Battalion of Rifles militia unit in North Hastings, Ontario (1867–1872); Minister of Militia and Defence 1892 and 1896 (acting)
Sir Charles Tupper	none	none	none
Sir Wilfrid Laurier	Active Militia	Ensign	Fenian Raids; Arthabaskaville Infantry Company
Sir Robert Laird Borden	none	none	none
Arthur Meighen	none	none	none
William Lyon Mackenzie King	none	none	none
Richard Bedford Bennett	none	none	none
Louis St. Laurent	none	none	none
John Diefenbaker	Canadian Expeditionary Force (Note: The Canadian Expeditionary Force (CEF) was constituted as a distinct force from the Canadian Militia. The Otter Commission established after the First World War, created links of perpetuation between the units of the CEF, and the units of the active militias.)	Lieutenant	Served during World War I (1916–1917) in Britain as member of 196th Battalion (Western Universities), CEF
Lester Bowles Pearson	Canadian Expeditionary Force	Lieutenant	Served during World War I in Greece and Egypt as member of Canadian Army Medical Corps and later in the Royal Flying Corps as Pilot (1915–1918) in Britain
Pierre Trudeau	Canadian Army	Officer cadet	None; Served in Canadian Officers' Training Corps from 1943 to 1945 in Montreal during World War II, but never deployed overseas
Joe Clark	none	none	none
John Turner	none	none	none
Brian Mulroney	none	none	none
Kim Campbell	none	none	none; Minister of National Defence 1993
Jean Chrétien	none	none	none
Paul Martin	none	none	none
Stephen Harper	none	none	none
Justin Trudeau	none	none	none
Mark Carney	none	none	none

== See also ==
- List of members of the Canadian House of Commons with military service
