= Haleloke Kahauolopua =

Hawaiian singer (1923–2004)

- Born: 1923; Hilo, Hawaii
- Died: 2004 (aged 80–81); Union City, Indiana

Haleloke Kahauolopua (1923–2004) was a 20th-century Hawaiian singer. She was sometimes billed under just her first name, Haleloke.

== Biography ==
Kahauolopua was born on February 2, 1923, in Hilo, Territory of Hawaii, into a musical family, her mother being active in Hilo music circles. She sang in glee clubs in high school but her studies at the University of Hawaii were cut short by World War II.

Kahauolopua was a featured vocalist on the radio show Hawaii Calls, hosted by Webley Edwards, from 1945 to 1950. Kahauolopua then came to the attention of Arthur Godfrey who brought her to New York, where she appeared frequently on his shows, dancing the hula as well as singing, and in a number of Hawaiian extravaganzas staged by Godfrey. In contrast to the typical Hawaiian falsetto voice (Hawaiian: ha'i) used by many Hawaiian singers of the time, Kahauolopua sang in a husky alto.

Kahauolopua cut a number of records, usually accompanied by Godfrey and his ukulele and the Archie Bleyer Orchestra, and sometimes by The Mariners vocal group. She was the only Hawaiian musician on her album Hawaiian Blossoms.

Godfrey became infamous for peremptorily firing employees, such as Julius LaRosa, fired on the air, and in April 1955 he fired Kahauolopua (along with Marion Marlowe, The Mariners, and three writers). This occasioned some criticism in the press.

Kahauolopua then retired from show business at a fairly young age, to the small rural town of Union City, Indiana to live with her friends, the Paul Keck family. She died in her adopted town on December 16, 2004.

== Discography ==
=== Singles ===
- "Ke Kal Nei Au (Wedding Song Of Hawaii) / Lovely Hula Hands" (Columbia CO 46446)
- "Lei Aloha / White Ginger Blossoms"
- "The Haole Hula" (1950, Presto)
- "Yaaka Hula Hickey Dula"

=== Albums ===
- Hawaiian Blossoms (with Arthur Godfrey; 1951, Columbia CL 6190)

Compilations

- Christmas with Arthur Godfrey and All the Little Godfreys (1953, Columbia B-348; Kahauolopua sings Mele Kalikimaka)
- Al Kealoha Perry & His Singing Surfriders: Aloha, Hula Hawaiian Style (1996, Hana Ola Records. Perry was musical director of Hawaii Calls 1937–1967, and all the artists on this record were from that show. Kahauolopua (billed as "Haleloke") sings "Alekoki", "Kolopa", and "Pua O Ka Makahala")
- My Isle of Golden Dreams (2003; Kahauolopua (billed as "Haleloke") sings "Pua O Ka Makahala")
