= Don Wright (composer) =

Canadian composer, musician, educator and philanthropist

Don Wright CM
- Born: Donald John Alexander Wright; September 6, 1908; Strathroy, Ontario
- Died: June 27, 2006 (aged 97); Toronto, Ontario
- Education: BA (1933), honorary DMus (1986), honorary LMus (1987)
- Alma mater: University of Western Ontario
- Occupations: Musician, Composer, Arranger, Educator, Philanthropist
- Known for: Canadian music composition and education
- Spouse: Lillian Meighen Wright (m. 1950; died 1993)

Don Wright, CM (September 6, 1908 - June 27, 2006) was a Canadian composer, musician, educator and philanthropist. He was a successful Canadian musician and popular music composer during his career from the 1930s to the 1960s and later became known for his large charitable donations and projects to fund music education in Canada.

== Early life ==
Wright was born in Strathroy, Ontario, in 1908. His father, James Wright, was a known business man in the area who started the Wright Piano Co., which produced and sold upright and grand pianos. At an early age, Wright began studying the cello and trumpet and quickly started to show talent, winning a national gold medal for trumpet performance at age 14.

== Wright Brothers' Orchestra ==
With three of his brothers (Clark on Alto Sax, Ernest on Banjo, and William on Drums) Don organized the Wright Brothers' Orchestra, which performed jazz and swing music from 1922 to 1935 in dance halls across Ontario.

The band played three summers from 1922 to 1925 at Brights Grove Pavilion in Sarnia, Ontario, and during this time Don was beginning to display his talents as arranger and finding out how to produce big band sounds with smaller instrumentation.

During the summers of 1926, 1927 and 1928, the band played at the Port Elgin Casino. The group was in high demand in the winters and since the brothers were all attending the University of Western Ontario, the band became associated with the school. From 1929 they toured, playing in Hamilton, Oshawa and Peterborough. In 1930, the group was booked for the whole season at the Embassy, a prominent night club in Toronto at the time. Further engagements followed at the Brant Inn (1931-1932) and the Terrace (1932 - 1934) in Burlington, Ontario.

At the end of the summer of 1934, the group disbanded and each of the brothers went on to develop their own careers.

== University of Western Ontario ==
Wright attended the University of Western Ontario and was involved with a number of organizations. He was a member of the Delta Upsilon fraternity and became a successful athlete as a sprinter, high hurdler and long jumper. Wright received his Bachelor of Arts in Honours Classics in 1933.

=== The COTC and the Western Mustang Band ===
For the main article see Western Mustang Band

While he was at university, he joined the Canadian Officers' Training Corps (COTC) as a Second Lieutenant and joined the COTC Band on campus. Wright started in the band playing trumpet while getting his undergraduate degree in the early 1930s. In his last year of his undergraduate degree, he became bandleader in 1933. After he finished his degree however, he was asked in 1935 to come back and direct the band again.

While under his direction, the band started to develop, with formal and strict rehearsals and drill planning. With his developing skills, Wright arranged all the music for the band, tailoring the music properly to the instrumentation of the band.

Wright added new instrumentation to the band by placing three Herald trumpets at the front of the parade block. Wright arranged fanfares for these trumpets to play to announce the entry of the band into the stadium as well as add flourishes to songs. Wright arranged full band instrumentation. Flutes, clarinets, saxophones, as well as all brass along with snare drums and a bass drum. Many of the arrangements he wrote for the band were based on his previous arrangements for the Wright Brothers' Orchestra. These short jazz arrangements deviated from the traditional marching band repertoire and became very popular at the football games, and gained positive response from the press.

When Wright came back to the band in 1935, he sought opportunity to delineate the band from the official government-run COTC unit and establish a group specifically targeted towards the school's needs. This would eliminate the involvement or need of official approval from the Canadian government for all the band's activities, and allow the group to be more involved in university activities such as pep rallies and football games.

In 1936, the University Student Council at Western put on a drive for funds to support the purchase of new uniforms. At this point, the COTC Band became the Western Mustang Band. The band debuted on October 2, 1937, during the Western Mustangs vs. Sarnia Imperials football game. As part of the new band, Wright appointed Beth Forbes, a first-year student as the Drum Major. Forbes became the first woman drum major in Canada.

After World War II broke out in September 1939, all extra-curricular activities at the university ceased. As a result, the band was put on an undetermined hiatus. Wright left the group to pursue help with the war.

== Career ==
After graduating university, Wright stayed in London, Ontario, and taught at Sir Adam Beck Collegiate as a music, history, Latin and Greek teacher.

After teaching at Beck, Wright became Director of Music for the London Board of Education in 1940. During this time, he tried to enlist to help the Canadian military for World War II. He was appointed Captain and returned to Western University to organize musical units and troop shows to entertain the services. Here he composed all the music and organized and trained all the Air Cadet Bands in London's secondary schools, where he held the rank of Flying Officer in the Royal Canadian Air Force (RCAF).

In 1946, he was asked to become station manager of local radio station CFPL. At CFPL, he interacted with Canadian talents such as Max Ferguson, Ward Cornell and Tommy Hunter. A Couple years later, he created the Don Wright Chorus in the early 1949. The chorus was a 14-voice choir who recorded popular and light classical music. They received widespread airplay on the Dominion Network in Canada and the Mutual Broadcasting System and NBC Radio in the United States.

He was married to Lillian Meighen Wright, the daughter of former Canadian Prime Minister Arthur Meighen. Their daughter Priscilla sang on a rendition of Warwick Webster's "The Man in the Raincoat", arranged by Don, which was an international hit and resulted in Priscilla performing the song on The Ed Sullivan Show on July 23, 1955.

Wright moved to Toronto in 1955, where he composed scores for films and TV and published a number of choral and popular songbooks for use in school music programs. He was the musical director for the Denny Vaughn Show, Wayne and Schuster, and Holiday Ranch. Most of Wright's success came from this era where he earned the nickname of "The Jingle King". He acted as musical director for several Canadian Broadcasting Corporation (CBC) Documentaries. During this time, he formed the Don Wright Singers in 1957. In 1961, Don suffered a heart attack.

Wright was commissioned to produce a choral work called Proudly We Praise and it was performed on Canada Day of 1967 for the Centennial celebration. During this time, he was presented the Centennial medal from Queen Elizabeth II.

In 2001, Wright was appointed as a Member of the Order of Canada.

After a short illness, Wright died at 97 years old on June 27, 2006, in Toronto, Ontario.

== Philanthropy ==
In 1966, the Don Wright Charitable Foundation was founded. Wright funded this endowment to provide 34 music scholarships in thirteen different universities across Canada, including the University of Victoria, the University of Toronto, and his own alma mater, Western University.

In 1993 following his wife's death, Wright became the heir to the estate of the Right Hon. Arthur Meighen. This estate, coupled with the large amount of royalties and performance fees Wright was earning at the time, allowed him to actively donate to charitable causes which promoted music education in Canada. That same year, he endowed a maternity department at Toronto's St. Michael's Hospital in his late wife's honour.

Wright donated $3,000,000 to Western University in 2002 and the university renamed its music faculty, the Don Wright Faculty of Music.

Wright also donated $1,000,000 to the University of Victoria to develop a music education wing in 2004.

The Wright Family Performing Arts and Entertainment Centre Foundation was established in 2014 by Don Wright's sister, Dr. Mary J. Wright and provides bursaries for charitable arts groups.
