= The Look of Love =

The Look of Love may refer to:

== Songs ==
- "The Look of Love" (1967 song), a popular song written by Burt Bacharach and Hal David
- "The Look of Love" (ABC song), 1982
- "The Look of Love" (Madonna song), 1987
- "Look of Love" (Lesley Gore song), 1964
- "The Look of Love", a song by Frank Sinatra from Softly, as I Leave You

== Albums ==
- The Look of Love (Claudine Longet album), 1967
- The Look of Love (Diana Krall album), 2001
- The Look of Love (Dusty Springfield album), 1967
- The Look of Love (Stanley Turrentine album), 1968
- The Look of Love (Trijntje Oosterhuis album), 2006
- Look of Love: The Very Best of ABC, a 2001 compilation album by ABC
- The Look of Love (Vivian Dandridge album), by Vivian Dandridge

== Other ==
- The Look of Love (musical), a musical revue featuring Bacharach-David songs
- The Look of Love (film), a 2013 UK film starring Steve Coogan
- The Look of Love was the working title of the 2013 film The Face of Love, starring Annette Bening and Ed Harris
