= Priscilla Wright =

Priscilla Wright may refer to:

- Priscilla Wright (born 1943), Playboy's Playmate of the Month in March 1966
- Priscilla Wright (singer) (born 1940), Canadian singer
