= Claudine =

Claudine may refer to:

== Name ==
- Claudine (given name), a feminine given name of French origin

== Culture ==
- Claudine (film), a 1974 American film by John Berry
  - Claudine (soundtrack), its soundtrack album. Music by Curtis Mayfield and Gladis Knight & the Pips
- Claudine (Claudine Longet album)
- Claudine (book series), the protagonist of a series of novels by Colette
- Claudine (TV series), a 2010 Philippine television series
- Claudine (manga), a 1978 Japanese manga series

== Others ==
- Claudine (1811 ship)
- Prince Claudin or Claudine, son of the Frankish King Claudas in the Arthurian legend
