= XI Canadian Field Ambulance (Western Universities) =

- Active: 1916–1919
- Country: Canada
- Branch: Canadian Expeditionary Force
- Type: Field Ambulance
- Garrison/HQ: Winnipeg
- Motto(s): In arduis fidelis 'faithful in adversity'
- Engagements: Battle of the Somme, Battle of Vimy Ridge, Hundred Days' Offensive

XI Canadian Field Ambulance (Western Universities) was a field ambulance unit in the Canadian Expeditionary Force during the First World War. Recruitment for the unit began during the winter of 1915/16 in universities throughout western Canada. After arriving in France in August 1916, XI Canadian Field Ambulance treated casualties at a number of major engagements, including the Battle of Vimy Ridge and the Hundred Days Offensive. It arrived back in Canada in 1919, and demobilized in May of that year.

== History ==
During the First World War, university staff and students from across western Canada wanted the opportunity to serve in the military while retaining their collective university identities. In December 1915, the University of Manitoba branch of the Canadian Officers' Training Corps sent two representatives to the University of British Columbia, University of Alberta, and University of Saskatchewan to lobby for these schools to agree on forming such a unit. This proposition was well received by these schools, along with Brandon College (now Brandon University), who sent representatives to a conference in Edmonton, Alberta, on 15 January 1916. There, it was unanimously agreed to apply for permission from the Minister of Militia and Defence to create two units: XI Canadian Field Ambulance (Western Universities), and the 196th (Western Universities) Battalion.

Canada approved the creation of these two units on 25 January 1916, and an organizing committee for XI Canadian Field Ambulance, led by the University of Alberta's President Henry Marshall Tory, was soon formed. The committee chose Major John Douglas McQueen, of Winnipeg, to lead the new unit; Edmonton's Dr. Heber Havelock Moshier became the second-in-command. McQueen, a surgeon, had previously served in France for a year with 3 Canadian Field Ambulance. Moshier was a professor of physiology at the University of Alberta, but had been the medical officer of 103rd Regiment (Calgary Rifles) until moving to Edmonton in 1914. Moshier chose John Ralph Hammond to be the unit's sergeant; Hammond had been a second-year medical student until becoming the hospital sergeant of 66th Battalion (Edmonton Guards) in July 1915, and transferred to 8 Canadian Field Ambulance in February 1916.

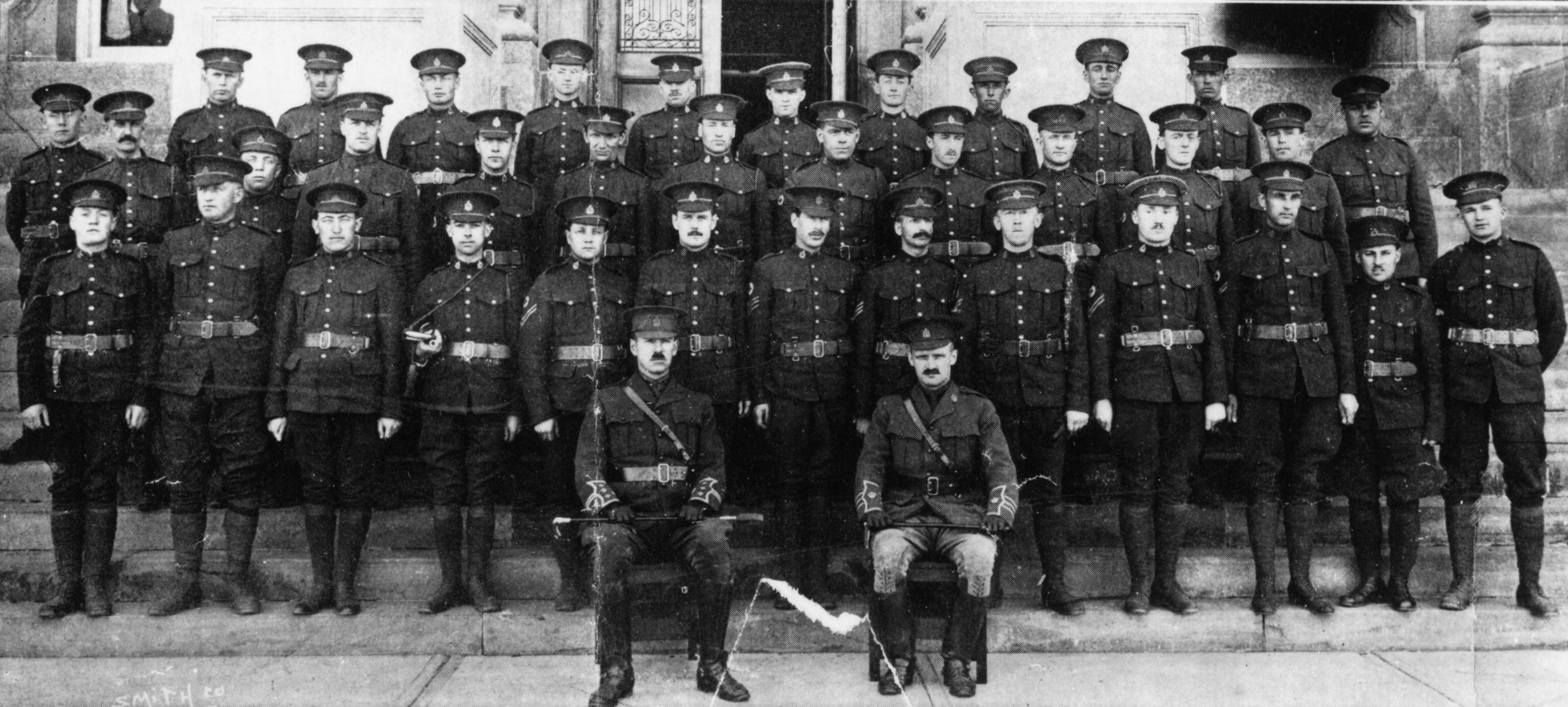
University of Alberta staff and students who joined XI Canadian Field Ambulance

After undergoing preliminary military training at their respective universities, the companies of XI Canadian Field Ambulance met together in Winnipeg, Manitoba, near the end of March 1916. They billeted initially at Manitoba Agricultural College, and underwent basic medic and soldier training such as stretcher handling, first aid, drill and marching, and rifle drills (although they were not armed while overseas). The unit departed Winnipeg on May 14, 1916, and embarked from Halifax on May 18 aboard the SS Adriatic. XI Canadian Field Ambulance underwent more training in England, and sailed for France in August 1916 aboard the SS Princess Clementine.

While overseas, XI Canadian Field Ambulance (Western Universities) supported 4th Canadian Division during its engagements. Some of these engagements included the Battle of the Somme, the Battle of Vimy Ridge, and the Hundred Days Offensive. Staff Sergeant John Ralph Hammond died on June 26, 1917, after a German shell exploded nearby while he was leading stretcher bearers from another section to relieve his men. He was posthumously mentioned in dispatches by Sir Douglas Haig on November 7, 1917. Lieutenant Colonel Mqueen was transferred to England in September 1917, at which point the unit's second-in-command, Major Moshier, took over as commander of the unit and received a promotion to acting lieutenant colonel. The unit's drum and fife band, which formed in June 1917, was forced to dissolve in October due to the large number of casualties among its members. However, the unit was able to form a bugle band in April 1918. Acting Lieutenant Colonel Moshier was killed by a shell on August 29, 1918, while attempting to find a way for his unit to safely bypass the French town of Wancourt, which was under fire from German artillery.

After hostilities ended on November 11, 1918, XI Canadian Field Ambulance spent time in various Belgian villages. Between January and April 1919, they stayed in Notre-Dame-au-Bois, a small village 14 km (9 mi) outside of Brussels. During this time, the Spanish flu tore through the region and killed two members of XI Canadian Field Ambulance. Both of these men were drivers in the unit's horse transport section, and had served with XI Canadian Field Ambulance since its inception in 1916. They were buried at a cemetery in Namur, Belgium. In order to combat the spread of the influenza, social events such as concerts and dances were cancelled – aggravating the soldiers who were getting restless while waiting to demobilize. The unit finally left Notre-Dame-au-Bois on April 24, after being seen off by most of the villagers. They arrived in Canada in May, and shortly thereafter demobilized in Toronto, Ontario.

== Battles ==
- Battle of the Somme (1916)
- Battle of Vimy Ridge (1917)
- Hundred Days' Offensive (1918)

== See also ==
- 196th Battalion (Western Universities)
