= The Man in the Raincoat (song) =

Single by Priscilla Wright with Don Wright and The Septette
- B-side: "Please Have Mercy"
- Released: April 1955
- Genre: Traditional pop
- Length: 2:53
- Label: Sparton
- Songwriter: Warwick Webster

Priscilla Wright singles chronology
| "The Man in the Raincoat" (1955) | "Midnight Train" (1955) |

"The Man in the Raincoat" is a song written by Warwick Webster, which was first released by Priscilla Wright in April 1955, and became a hit in the United States. Another hit version was released by Marion Marlowe later that year.

== Priscilla Wright versions ==
Priscilla Wright's original version was recorded at the studios of CFPL, where Don Wright was station manager. The song was originally recorded for the Canadian Sparton label, and was released in the United States on the Unique label. Wright was 14 at the time the song was released, and was the daughter of Don Wright, who was the arranger on the recording. Priscilla Wright performed the song on Ed Sullivan's Toast of the Town on July 3, 1955.

Priscilla Wright re-recorded the song in 1988. This version reached No. 8 on RPM's Adult Contemporary chart.

== Chart performance ==
The song reached No. 12 on the Cash Box Top 50 Best Selling Records chart, in a tandem ranking of Priscilla Wright, Marion Marlowe, Karen Chandler, and Lita Roza's versions, with Priscilla Wright and Marion Marlowe's versions marked as bestsellers, while reaching No. 10 on Cash Box's chart of records disk jockeys played most, in a tandem ranking of Priscilla Wright and Marion Marlowe's versions, and No. 11 on Cash Box's chart of "The Nation's Top Ten Juke Box Tunes". The song also reached No. 11 on Billboard's Honor Roll of Hits.

The song was ranked No. 50 on Billboard's ranking of "1955's Top Tunes", based on the Honor Roll of Hits.

=== Priscilla Wright version ===
| Chart (1955) | Peak position |
|---|---|
| US Billboard Best Sellers in Stores | 18 |
| US Billboard Most Played by Jockeys | 16 |
| US Billboard Most Played in Juke Boxes | 20 |

=== Marion Marlowe version ===
| Chart (1955) | Peak position |
|---|---|
| US Billboard Most Played by Jockeys | 14 |
| US Billboard Most Played in Juke Boxes | 18 |

== Claudine Longet version ==
In 1967, Claudine Longet released a version of the song as the B-side of "Small Talk" and on the album The Look of Love.
