= 196th Battalion (Western Universities), CEF =

196th (Western Universities) Battalion
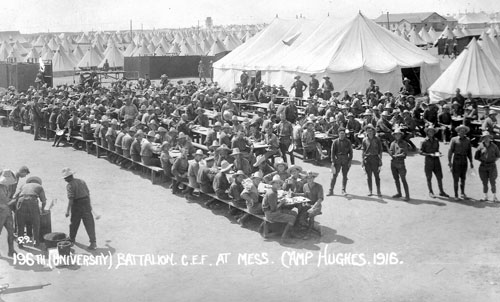
- The battalion at mess, in Camp Hughes, 1916
- Active: 1916–1917
- Country: Canada
- Branch: Canadian Expeditionary Force
- Type: Infantry
- Mobilization headquarters: Winnipeg
- Nicknames: WUBians; Little Grey Devils
- Battle honours: The Great War, 1916–17

Commanders
- Officer Commanding: Lt. Col. Daniel Sayre MacKay

The 196th (Western Universities) Battalion, CEF was a numbered battalion in the Canadian Expeditionary Force during the First World War. Based in Winnipeg, Manitoba, the unit began recruiting during the winter of 1915/16 in universities throughout western Canada. After sailing to England in November 1916, the battalion was absorbed into the 19th Reserve Battalion on January 2, 1917, and its members were later dispersed across a number of different units.

== History ==
=== Creation ===
During the First World War, university staff and students from across western Canada wanted the opportunity to serve in the military while retaining their collective university identities. In December 1915, the University of Manitoba branch of the Canadian Officers' Training Corps sent two representatives to the University of British Columbia, University of Alberta, and University of Saskatchewan to lobby for these schools to agree on forming such a unit. This proposition was well received by these schools, along with Brandon College (now Brandon University), who sent representatives to a conference in Edmonton, Alberta, on 15 January 1916. Here, it was unanimously agreed to apply for permission from the Minister of Militia and Defence to create two units: The 196th (Western Universities) Battalion, and XI Canadian Field Ambulance (Western Universities).

Canada approved the creation of these two units on 25 January 1916, and an organizing committee for the 196th Battalion was soon formed. The committee, which was led by University of Alberta President Henry Marshall Tory, first met on 7 February in Winnipeg, Manitoba. It was agreed that each of the four universities would raise one company of four platoons for the battalion. The University of Saskatchewan was an exception; it would raise a company of three platoons, with Brandon College forming the fourth.

The organizing committee was also responsible for choosing the battalion's officers. The committee chose Lieutenant-Colonel Daniel Sayre MacKay, who was second-in-command of the 27th Battalion in France and a prewar physician and surgeon, to be the 196th Battalion's commanding officer. His second-in-command was Major Reginald Walter Brock, who was a geologist and Dean of the University of British Columbia's Faculty of Engineering who previously served with the 72nd Battalion (Seaforth Highlanders of Canada). After the core battalion was formed, each institution was responsible for organizing its respective company.

=== Training ===
All battalions arrived in Camp Hughes by the end of June, 1916. There, it underwent a twelve-week training course, which included digging and maintaining part of the camp's trench system (which is now among the only surviving trenches from the First World War); some men specialized in trades such as machine gunning and signaling, and many officers attended specialty schools to learn bombing (grenade throwing), musketry, and other specialized tasks. During their time in Camp Hughes, the men of the 196th Battalion developed a strong bond over their shared identities. They called themselves "WUBians" (short for Western Universities Battalion), and the "Little Grey Devils" — which stemmed from the grey breeches they were made to wear. One volume of a battalion newspaper was published on 21 October 1916. The battalion departed Camp Hughes on 26 October 1916, and inspected by Prime Minister Robert Bordon and Minister of Defence and Militia Sam Hughes on 29 October. They embarked for England on 1 November, aboard the SS Southland and reached Liverpool on 16 November.

=== Disbandment ===
Upon arrival in England, the 196th Battalion was billeted at Seaford. Brigadier-General J.P. Landry, Commander of the Canadian troops stationed there, wrote that the 196th Battalion was:

"... well officered, well organized and well disciplined and undoubtedly one of the best sent over from Canada ... and would it not be in the best interests of the service to keep it as a reserve for officers to be taken from as needs arose. There are at present 202 Other Ranks recommended by the C.O. as be available for appointment to commissioned ranks."

On 16 December, an order was issued to halt all drafts of manpower from the 196th while the army decided what to do with its men, due to how many of them were considered to be officer-material. During this time, the battalion's companies were dispersed among a large area and mixed with other units, diminishing its officers' ability to maintain control over the battalion as a whole. The men of the battalion began a 14-week training period, because Canada's domestic training was seen by the English to be sub-par. The four companies of the 196th were reunited on 31 December 1916, and two days later merged with the 222nd Battalion to form the 19th Reserve Battalion. In early 1917, the 19th Reserve Battalion was dissolved and its men sent to a number of different units, including the 46th "suicide" battalion, the 1st Battalion, Canadian Mounted Rifles, and the Canadian Machine Gun Corps.

In 1929, the battalion was awarded the theatre of war honour The Great War, 1916–17.

Canada did not assemble a 'universities battalion' during the Second World War in-part due to lessons learned from the 196th Battalion. Government, military, and university officials became reluctant to "waste" people with special skills and knowledge who could become officers or conduct important research instead of enrolling in combat roles that did not utilize their education.

== Companies ==
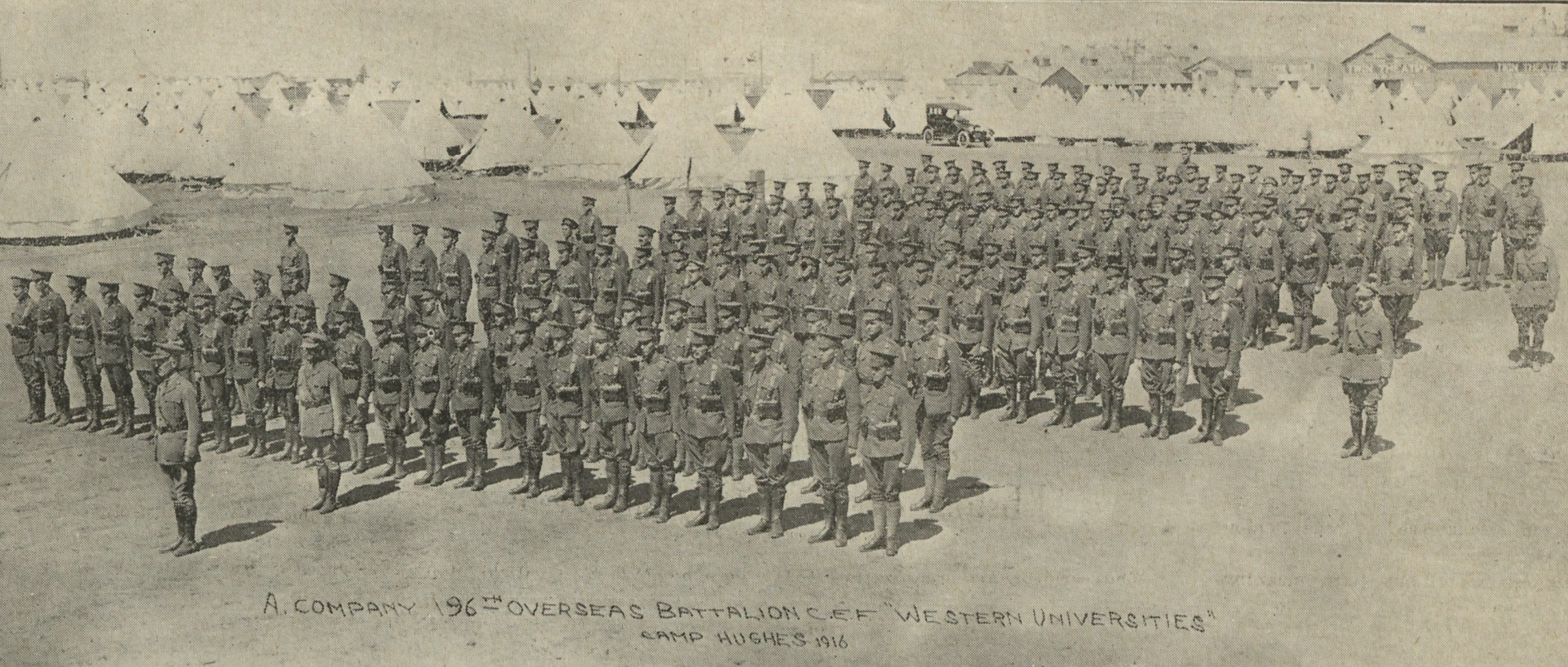
A Company at Camp Hughes, 1916

=== "A" Company (Manitoba) ===
Source:

=== "B" Company (Saskatchewan) ===
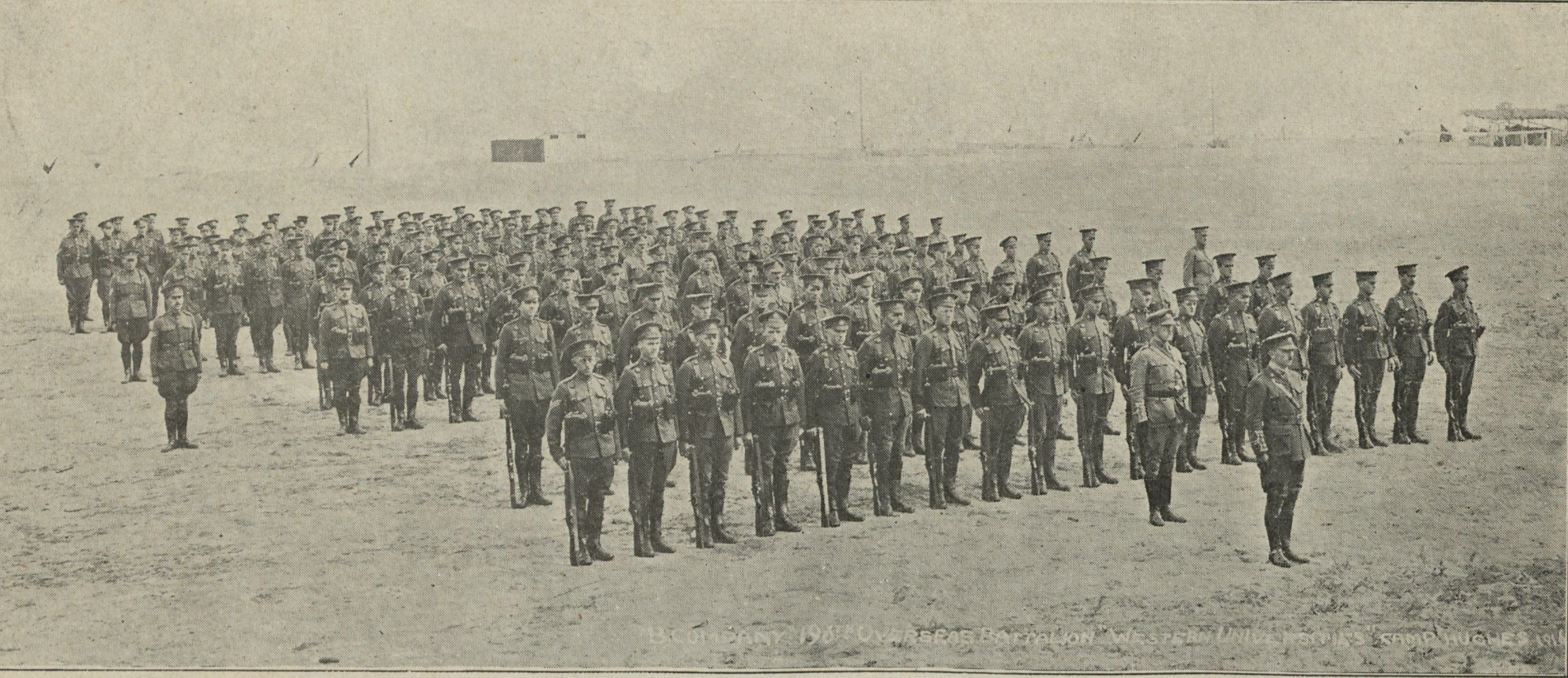
B Company at Camp Hughes in 1916

This company was primarily composed of students from the University of Saskatchewan and Brandon College. After the President of the University of Saskatchewan approved the formation of "B" Company in January 1916, a recruiting office was opened in the student residence Qu'Appelle Hall. By 1 May 1916, the three platoons from the University of Saskatchewan were filled. Meanwhile, recruiting for Brandon College's platoon began in early March and was led by Lieutenant Evans, who was Principal of the school's academic department.

Initial training took place on their respective school grounds, following a syllabus outlined by battalion headquarters staff in Winnipeg. In May 1916, the men of "B" Company were gathered in the University of Saskatchewan's Convocation Hall and informed that Sergeant Bateman, who was deployed "somewhere in France" with the 28th battalion, would return to Canada and be promoted to major to become their company's commanding officer. Bateman was previously a professor of English at the University of Saskatchewan, but left his job in 1914 to enlist in the army. "B" Company arrived in Camp Hughes on 4 and 5 June 1916.

=== "C" Company (Alberta) ===
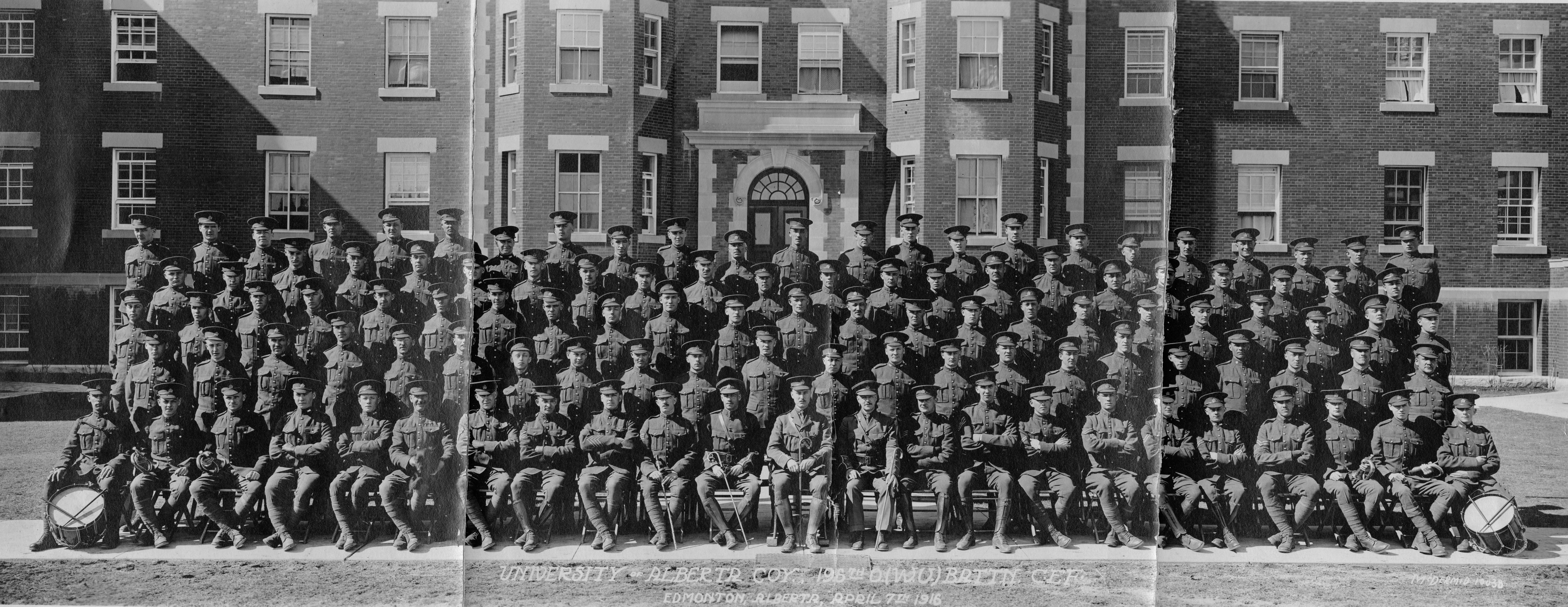
C Company at the University of Alberta, before departing for Camp Hughes.

Recruiting for "C" Company began on 14 February 1916, when 20 men enlisted. Due to the school's small size, with less than 500 students and staff altogether as of 1914, the University of Alberta looked beyond its students and staff for potential recruits. Advertisements were placed in newspapers across Alberta advertising the chance for professionals to enlist in "C" Company; aside from students and staff from the university, it also attracted engineers, bank clerks, students from Camrose Normal School, and other educated professionals. Students in grade 12 could receive a full year's credit by enlisting, so long as their teacher recommended them.

Soon before they left the University of Alberta in spring 1916, the men of "C" Company filled the school's Convocation Hall to see their captain, H.J. Macleod, who was formerly a member of the school's Physics Department, receive his Master's in Science. During this ceremony, they were given parting speeches from some school administrators. "C" Company arrived in Camp Hughes on 24 June 1916. Between 1917 and 1918, 240 former members of "C" Company were killed or wounded on the Western Front.

=== "D" Company (British Columbia) ===
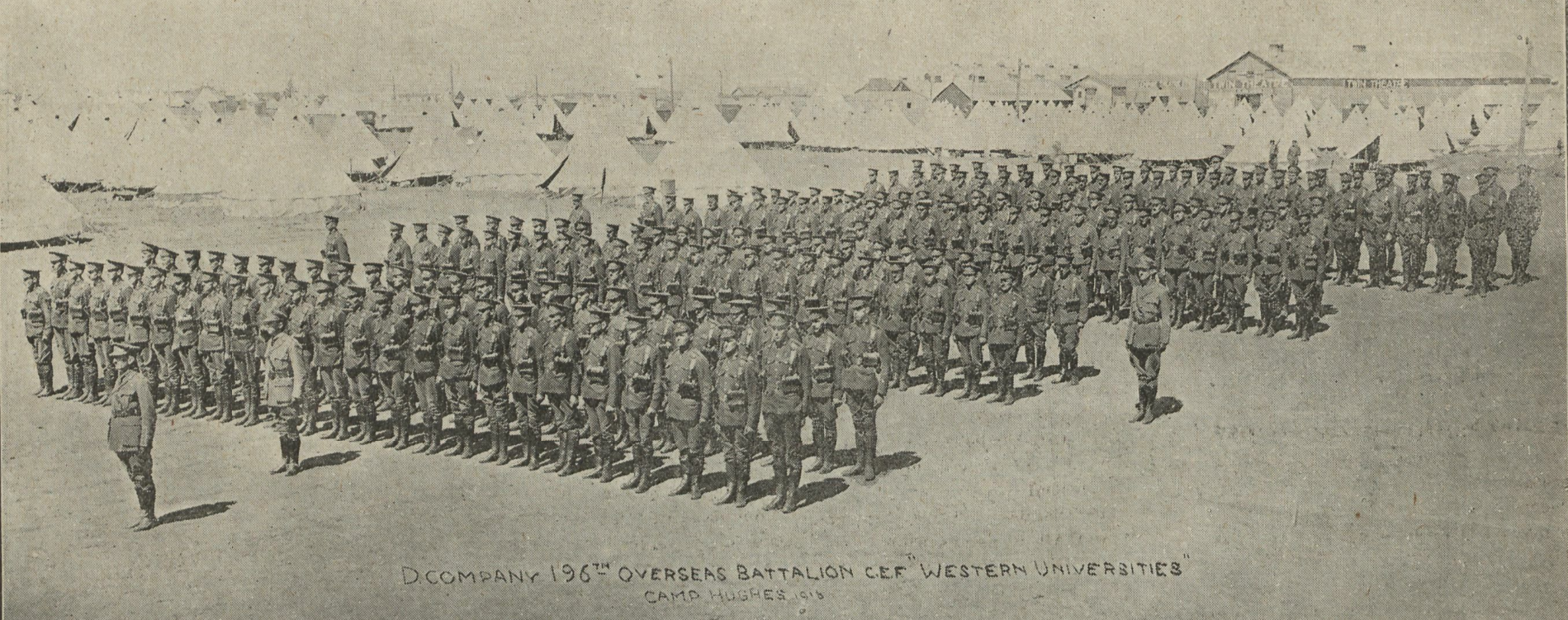
D Company at Camp Hughes, 1916

The recruits for "D" Company were billeted at the University of British Columbia, in a building where the Vancouver General Hospital now sits. Their preliminary training took place on the grounds of King Edwards High School. "D" Company was the last company of the 196th Battalion to arrive at Camp Hughes, with their train pulling into the station on 29 June 1916.

== Notable members ==
- Future Prime Minister John Diefenbaker was a lieutenant in the battalion 1916–1917.
- The battalion chaplain was the distinguished theologian and principal of St Andrew's College, Saskatoon, Edmund Henry Oliver.
- Future Major-General Harry Letson.

== See also ==
- XI Canadian Field Ambulance (Western Universities)
