= Archie Bleyer =

American song arranger, bandleader, and record company executive (1909–1989)

- Born: June 12, 1909; New York City, New York, U.S.
- Died: March 20, 1989 (aged 79); Sheboygan, Wisconsin, U.S.
- Occupations: Arranger, bandleader, record company executive

Archibald Martin Bleyer (June 12, 1909 – March 20, 1989) was an American song arranger, bandleader, and record company executive.

== Early life ==
Bleyer was born in the Corona section of the New York City borough of Queens. His father was a well-known trumpet player who had played with the Metropolitan Opera. The younger Bleyer began playing the piano when he was only seven years old. In 1927, he attended Columbia College, intending to become an electrical engineer, but as a sophomore switched to a music major. Without graduating, he left to become an arranger. In the early 1930s, Bleyer wrote a number of songs that were recorded, all 'hot' novelty numbers, including "Mouthful O'Jam", "Business In F" and "Business In Q".

In 1934, he began to lead his own band at Earl Carroll's club in Hollywood, California. Bleyer's orchestra recorded for Vocalion Records in 1934 and in 1935 moved to the ARC group of labels (Melotone, Perfect, Romeo, Oriole). One of the vocalists who worked with this orchestra was Johnny Mercer, who later became known as a songwriter and co-founder of Capitol Records.

In 1945, Bleyer began a collaboration on the CBS radio network as the orchestra conductor for the popular Gordon MacRae Show. Included among the instrumentalist who appeared with his orchestra was John Serry Sr., who emerged in later years as a leading orchestral accordionist.

== Godfrey years ==
Bleyer became Arthur Godfrey's musical director in 1946, remaining in this role until 1953. Many close to Godfrey considered Bleyer's creativity and understanding of music to be pivotal to the success of Godfrey's radio and TV programs. And while Godfrey was known to be short-fused and controlling, he often deferred to Bleyer's judgment in the areas of presentation and production.

Bleyer founded Cadence Records in 1952. The label's first artist was Julius La Rosa, a member of the Godfrey cast, which also included vocalists Janette Davis, Frank Parker, Marion Marlowe, and the racially integrated vocal group The Mariners. At the time, La Rosa was the show's most popular cast member. Bleyer had several instrumental hit singles of his own, and signed other artists who had performed on Godfrey's programs, including The Chordettes, one of whose members, Janet Ertel, became his wife in 1954.

In the fall of 1953, Godfrey dismissed La Rosa on the air and later claimed the young singer "lacked humility", which diminished Godfrey's popularity. La Rosa had hired a personal manager, going against an unofficial Godfrey policy. That same day, Godfrey fired Bleyer, apparently offended when Bleyer recorded spoken recitations by Chicago radio personality Don McNeill, host of Don McNeill's Breakfast Club. This long-running Godfrey-like show was based in Chicago and broadcast nationally, but its popularity was mainly in the Midwest and tailored to that audience. Always insecure, Godfrey felt McNeill, whose show had once been a competitor, was still in competition though Godfrey was the dominant personality of his generation. Godfrey later claimed when he confronted Bleyer and threatened to fire him from at least one of the three shows Godfrey hosted, the conductor shrugged and told him to do what he had to do.

Radio historian John Dunning has suggested, in On the Air: The Encyclopedia of Old-Time Radio, that Bleyer's relationship with Janet Ertel was also a factor in Godfrey's decision to fire him; Godfrey tried to enforce a no-dating policy among his cast and fired several who dated each other. Bleyer never made a public comment about his days with Godfrey. The public furor that surrounded LaRosa's firing and, to a lesser extent, Bleyer's, began the slow unraveling of Godfrey's seemingly unstoppable dominance of radio and TV, just as Bleyer's career was beginning to blossom. The loss of Bleyer's expertise in staging and production matters, where he served as an informal mentor to Godfrey despite their age differences, was detrimental to Godfrey's programs.

== Cadence Records ==
While LaRosa was unable to sustain his early successes, later Cadence artists included Andy Williams and the label's biggest act of all, The Everly Brothers, whose hits such as "Bye Bye Love" and "Wake Up Little Susie" were produced by Bleyer in Nashville with country studio musicians led by Chet Atkins. Bleyer was also the step father-in-law of Phil Everly. (In 1963, Everly married Jacqueline Alice Ertel, daughter of Bleyer's wife, Janet. They divorced in 1970.) Don Shirley appeared on the label in 1955 with "Tonal Expressions". It became a Top 15 album in the spring of that year, reportedly selling more than 20,000 copies, a respectable debut for a jazz artist. It was the only chart album Shirley was to enjoy, but his sales remained steady enough that he was with the label until it closed in 1964, recording more than a dozen long-play releases.

Bleyer also had limits to his tolerance for rock and roll. While he clearly, and correctly, viewed the Everlys as a commercially appealing, clean-cut act whose country-influenced harmonies could reach a vast following, he was not as tolerant of pioneer garage-rock guitarist Link Wray. In 1957, Bleyer reluctantly agreed to release Wray's no-frills, roaring instrumental "Rumble," in part due to his daughter's fascination with the song. Wray had a contract with Cadence, but in 1958 after he submitted a newly recorded album of similarly raw material recorded in Nashville, Bleyer was convinced the instrumental music was morally and musically inappropriate. He shelved the album and canceled Wray's contract. The material would not be released for decades until it was acquired by the British Rollercoaster label.

Cadence had a short-lived jazz subsidiary, Candid, which lasted for about a year from 1960 (it was reactivated under new owners several decades later).

Cadence had another major hit in 1962 with comic Vaughn Meader's album The First Family, which featured Meader's comedic sketches and his peerless impersonations of President John F. Kennedy. The album was an enormous seller, as was a follow-up, until Kennedy was assassinated in 1963.

Cadence always maintained a small roster of artists. Other Cadence hits included 14 chart hits by Johnny Tillotson, ten by The Chordettes, four by Lenny Welch, and two by Don Shirley. In 1964, Bleyer, who was unable to accept the changing pop music market at the dawn of the British Invasion, sold the Cadence label and all its recordings (except for certain material which he kept to himself, like the Link Wray album). The buyer was Cadence artist Andy Williams, who formed Barnaby Records to manage the Cadence catalog.

Bleyer moved with his wife Janet to her hometown of Sheboygan, Wisconsin, where he died in 1989 of the effects of Parkinson's disease, less than a year after his wife.

Bleyer was a freemason, and a member of St. Cecile Lodge No. 568, New York City.

== Selected records ==
- "Amber", first instrumental (1954)
- "Hernando's Hideaway" (1954)
- "The Naughty Lady of Shady Lane" (1954)
