= Marion Marlowe =

American singer and actress (1929 - 2012)

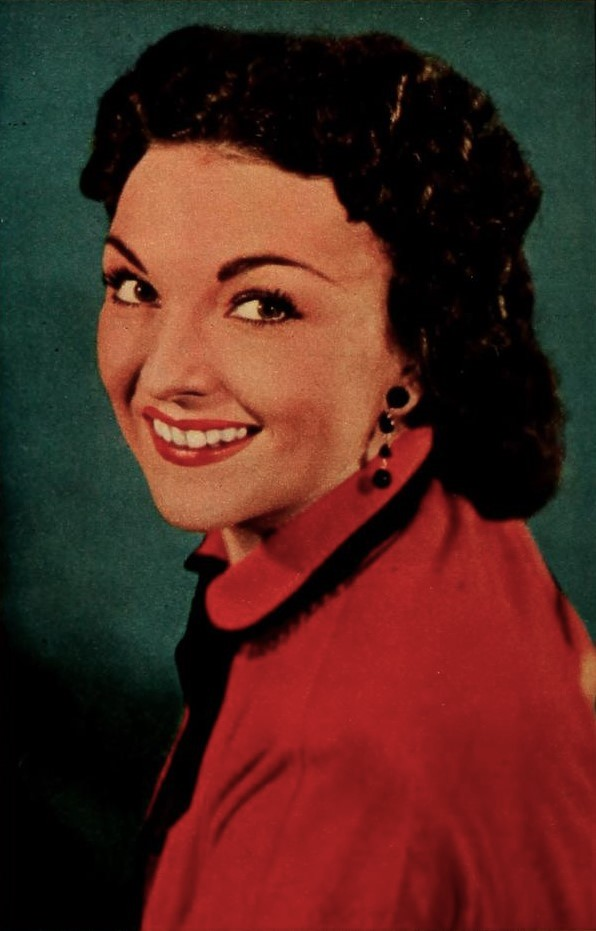
- Marlowe in 1953
- Born: Marion Townsend; March 7, 1929; St. Louis, Missouri, U.S.
- Died: March 24, 2012 (aged 83); Tucson, Arizona, U.S.
- Occupations: Actress, singer
- Years active: 1946–1963

Marion Marlowe (born Marion Townsend; March 7, 1929 – March 24, 2012) was an American singer and actress. She is best known for her recordings of "The Man in the Raincoat" and "Heartbeat". Marlowe worked with Frank Parker ("Moonlight and Roses") and was married to the television producer Larry Puck.

== Early years ==
Marlowe was born in St. Louis, Missouri, and her father died several years later. At that point Marlowe and her mother (a ballerina who had danced with the Metropolitan Opera) moved in with her grandparents. Her initial public performance came at age 5 when she sang Ave Maria at the Moolah Temple in St. Louis. She had her own quarter-hour weekly radio program from age 9 until she was 13.

According to Richard Lamparksi's 1975 book Whatever Became of...?, Marlowe began taking vocal lessons when she was 12 years old and studied at London's Royal Conservatory under Sir Thomas Beecham. Later, she roomed with Marilyn Monroe at Hollywood's Studio Club while being coached by Sigmund Romberg.

== Career ==
=== Television ===
Marlowe is best known for her performances on the television variety series Arthur Godfrey and His Friends from 1950 to 1955, in which she sang duets with Frank Parker as the "Jeanette MacDonald and Nelson Eddy of the 1950s."

In April 1955, she was dropped from CBS's roster, and the same month she was fired by Arthur Godfrey from his show along with fellow cast members Haleloke and the Mariners. After being fired by Godfrey, she was signed by Ed Sullivan to make six appearances on his Toast of the Town program. Her contract with Sullivan provided $18,000 for the six appearances, compared to $1,500 per week for six shows with Godfrey.

=== Recording ===
She recorded for Columbia Records, then Cadence Records in the mid-1950s, and had a hit single with "The Man in the Raincoat", which reached no. 14 on Billboard's chart of "Most Played by Jockeys" in 1955.

=== Stage ===
Marlowe later pursued a career as a stage actress, most notably as the Baroness, Elsa Schraeder, in the original production of The Sound of Music, from 1959 to 1963. In 1964 she starred in the Off-Broadway flop The Athenian Touch.

== Personal life ==
On May 6, 1955, Marlowe married television producer Larry Puck, who also had been fired by Godfrey.

== Death ==
Marlowe died of natural causes in Tucson, Arizona on March 24, 2012, aged 83.

== Partial discography ==
- Romance (with Frank Parker—1953, Columbia CL 6267)
- Whatever Happens/Where Flamingos Fly (1956, Cadence 1300)
- Sweethearts (with Frank Parker—1957, Harmony HL 7022)
