= Don Wright Faculty of Music =

Faculty of the University of Western Ontario, Canada

- Former names: Conservatory of London; Western Ontario Conservatory of Music; College of Music
- Type: Public music school
- Established: 1968; 58 years ago
- Parent institution: University of Western Ontario
- Budget: CA$10,626,544 (2019–20)
- Dean: Sophie Roland
- Undergraduates: 465
- Postgraduates: 125
- Location: London, Ontario, Canada; 43°00′26″N 81°16′14″W
- Website: www.music.uwo.ca

The Don Wright Faculty of Music is the faculty of music at the University of Western Ontario in London, Ontario, Canada. The faculty was founded in 1968. Originally known as just the Faculty of Music, it was renamed in 2002 in honour of Don Wright after a significant donation.

The faculty is situated Western's main campus in Talbot College and the Music Building and offers undergraduate and postgraduate degrees. As of 2020, there are ca. 610 students enrolled in the faculty. The current dean is Michael Kim, who has been in the position since August 2021. Current associate deans are John Cuciurean (Undergraduate Admissions & Programs) and Kevin Mooney (Graduate Studies).

== History ==
=== Early history ===
The University of Western Ontario (originally known as The Western University of London) was founded in 1878 and the current campus of the university was developed in 1923.

The London Conservatory of Music (founded 1892) and the London Institute of Musical Art (founded 1919) were two private music schools operating out of London, Ontario that contributed to the formation of the current faculty. In 1922, London Institute of Musical Art absorbed the London Conservatory of Music and fell under the affiliation of the Toronto Conservatory of Music. This stayed until the formation of the Western Ontario Conservatory of Music in 1934. In 1938 the conservatory's principal was appointed director of music for the university, and the offices were moved from downtown London to the McIntosh Gallery on the university campus in 1942.

A Music Teacher's College was established in 1945, changing its name to College of Music in 1961 and becoming part of the Faculty of Arts and Science.

=== Faculty of Music ===
On July 1, 1968, the college became the Faculty of Music with Clifford von Kuster as the first Dean. Following rapid expansion, a new music building was officially opened in 1972. Hugh McLean was dean of the Faculty of Music from 1973 to 1980, followed by Jack Behrens from 1980 to 1986 and Jeffrey Stokes from 1986 to 2000. Robert Wood was appointed dean in 2001, followed by Betty Anne Younker, the Faculty of Music's first female dean from 2011 to 2021.

In 2002, the faculty was renamed the Don Wright Faculty of Music after a CA$3,000,000 donation by Canadian composer, musician and educator Donald J. Wright.

Renovations to Talbot Theatre were completed in August 2009, and the hall was renamed in honour of retiring University president Paul Davenport. Talbot College and the Music Building underwent extensive renovations and additions which were completed in 2018.

== Departments ==
The Don Wright Faculty of Music has three departments:

- Department of Music Education
- Department of Music Research and Composition
- Department of Music Performance Studies

== Degrees offered ==
=== Undergraduate degrees ===
Degrees offered in the faculty include the Bachelor of Music with Honours in general music, music education, performance, music research, or composition; the Bachelor of Music in general music studies; and the Bachelor of Arts with Majors in music (Honours), music administrative studies or popular music studies, as well as Minors in music or dance.

Since 2013, the Don Wright Faculty of Music and the Richard Ivey School of Business offer a concurrent five-year program with a Bachelor of Music (general music studies) or Bachelor of Arts (Music) and a Bachelor of Arts in Honours Business Administration (HBA).

=== Postgraduate degrees ===
Graduate degrees include the Master of Music in composition, theory, music education, literature and performance; the Master of Arts in musicology, theory, and popular music and culture; the PhD in musicology, theory, composition, music education; and the DMA (Doctor of Musical Arts) in performance studies.

=== Diplomas ===
The Faculty also offers a music performance diploma in conjunction with another area of study at the university and a one-year artist diploma in performance.

Since 2012, the faculty has offered an integrated Music Recording Arts (MRA) program in collaboration with Fanshawe College. Graduates of the program will receive a Bachelor of Music (general music studies) degree as well as an Ontario College Diploma in Music Industry Arts (MIA).

== Other programs ==
The Don Wright Faculty of Music offers certificate and extra-curricular programs for community members and students.

The faculty operates the Canadian Operatic Arts Academy and the Accademia Europea Dell’Opera. These programs are designed for opera performers to further their skills and participants learn about skills such as vocal health, audition preparation and performance exercises. The Canadian Operatic Arts Academy is offered on the Western university campus in London, Ontario while the Accademia Europea Dell’Opera program runs internationally in collaboration with the Centro Studi Opera Omnia Luigi Boccherini in Italy.

The faculty also participates in the New Horizons Adult Band program. Originally created at the Eastman School of Music, the program was brought to Western in 1999. This concert band was created to allow adults to learn an instrument and play in a group with others of similar beginner skill level.

== Ensembles ==
2019–2020 ensembles and directors:

- Western University Symphony Orchestra – Simone Luti
- Western University Wind Ensemble – Colleen Richardson, DMA
- Western University Symphonic Band – Shawn Chabot
- Western University Jazz Ensemble – Kevin Watson, DME
- Western University Singers – Mark Ramsay, DMA
- St. Cecilia Singers – Gloria Gassi
- Chorale – Patrick Murray
- Les Choristes – Janet Loo
- Opera – Theodore Baerg
- Percussion Ensemble – Jill Ball, DMA
- Early Music Studio – Joseph Lanza
- Contemporary Music Studio – Patricia Green & Paul Frehner, DMus

== Performance venues ==
=== Paul Davenport Theatre ===
The Paul Davenport Theatre is located in Talbot College and seats 400. It usually hosts over 200 performances per year. The theatre is the main performance venue for the large ensembles such as the symphony orchestra, jazz band and wind ensemble.

In 2009, the theatre received a CA$5,000,000 renovation with half the cost being offset by fundraising campaigns. During this time, it was renamed to honour former university president, Paul Davenport.

=== von Kuster Hall ===
The von Kuster Recital Hall is a small, 232 seat performance hall located in the Music Building. The hall is primarily used as a venue for the performance of chamber music, small ensembles and recitals. The hall also is used as a recording venue. The hall is named after the first dean of the Faculty of Music, Clifford von Kuster.

=== Moscovich Recital Hall ===
Moscovich Recital Hall (formerly Studio 242) is a smaller scale hall used for recitals and classes, located in room 242 of the music building. It also serves as a smaller recording studio.

=== Alumni Hall ===
Alumni Hall was built as a multi-purpose hall in the late 1960s and is mainly used today for convocation ceremonies, basketball, volleyball and other indoor events.

Prior to the renovation of the Paul Davenport Theatre, Western's symphony orchestra used the 2,300-seat auditorium as a performance space.
