= Michael Kim (pianist) =

Canadian concert pianist and professor (born 1968)

Michael Kim (born 1968) is a Canadian concert pianist and professor. He is currently the Dean of the Don Wright Faculty of Music at Western University in London, Ontario and has held the position since August 2021. He was also Dean of the School of Music at Brandon University and earlier Chair of the Keyboard Department, and faculty associate to the President at Lawrence University, Wisconsin.

== Early life ==
Kim was born in Quebec City, Quebec. Discouraged by his father (a professional orchestra musician) from entering the music field early on, Dr. Kim began piano lessons at age 11, and made his professional debut at age 15, performing Rachmaninov's first piano concerto with the Calgary Philharmonic at the Banff Festival of the Arts.

Kim graduated from the Academy of Music at Mount Royal University and the University of Calgary where he studied under Marilyn Engle. He also holds Master of Music and Doctor of Musical Arts degrees from the Juilliard School.

== Career ==
Kim toured extensively as a recitalist and chamber musician throughout North America, South America, the United Kingdom and Korea, also performing as concerto soloist with the Boston and Cincinnati Pops, the Royal Scottish National Orchestra, and many major Canadian orchestras.

In 2001, while faculty member at Lawrence University, Kim married fellow pianist Kyung Kim (Park) who was also a piano faculty member there.

In 2008, Kim was appointed Dean of the School of Music at Brandon University, a position he held until 2015.

Kim has won grand prizes in the CBC National Radio Competition for Young Performers and the Canadian Music Competition, Canada Council for the Arts, and prizes in the Scottish, Leeds, and Ivo Pogorelich International Piano Competitions.

In 2010, Kim provided classical accompaniment to the play The Schumann Letters in Toronto. He also continued to perform solo recitals.

In 2015, Kim was hired as director of the University of Minnesota School of Music.

Michael and Kyung Kim collaborate frequently as a duo, especially in one piano four hand repertoire. In 2017 the couple performed with the St. Paul Chamber Orchestra. That year Kim also performed as part of the play Nadia, in which he emulated various composers who had been students of Nadia Boulanger.

== Discography ==
- Ballads of Grieg and Chopin Orpheum Masters KSP840
- Live in Recital (works by Chopin, Stravinsky & Mussorgsky) Orpheum Masters KSP850
- Music of Franz Liszt Orpheum Masters KSP880
- Chamber Works – Camille Saint-Saëns with the Banff Camerata Summit Records DCD 157
- A La Par with the Lawrence Conservatory Contemporary Music Ensemble CRI CD 823
- Wednesdays at Winspear Arktos Recordings Limited W@W200402

== See also ==
- Canadian classical music
- List of Canadian musicians
- Music of Canada
