= Claudine Longet =

French singer (1942–2026)

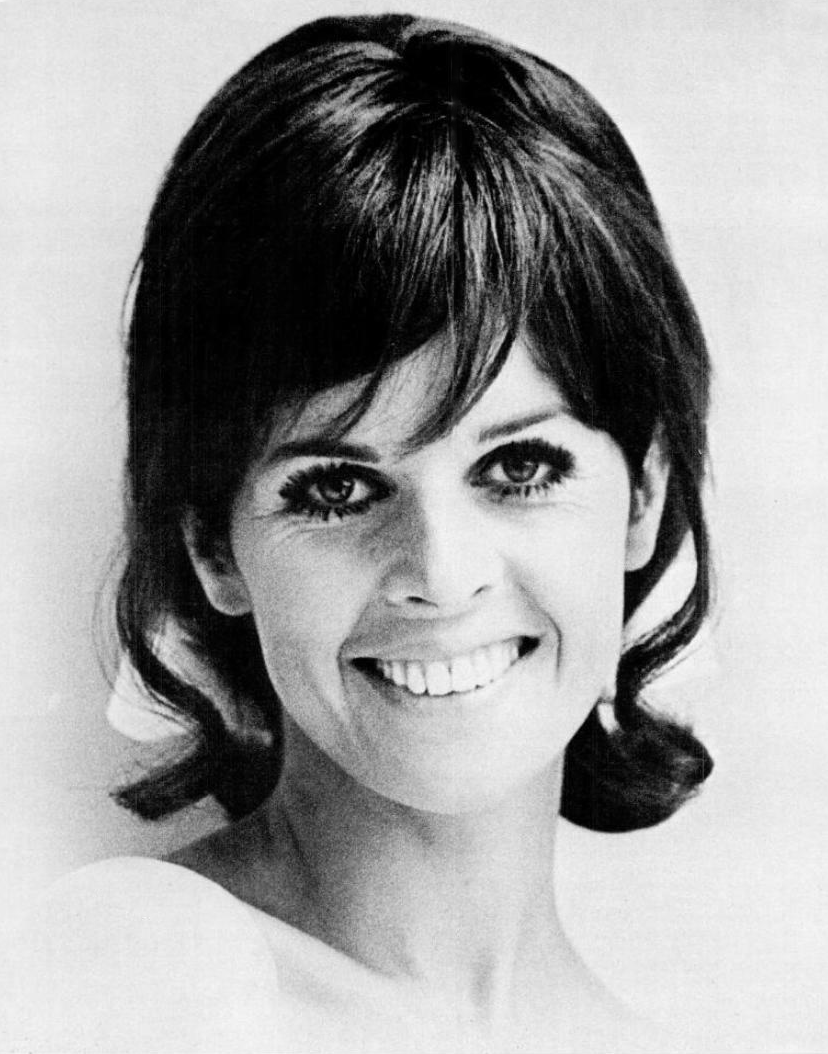
- Longet in 1969

Background information
- Born: Claudine Georgette Longet; January 29, 1942; Paris, German-occupied France
- Died: May 14, 2026 (aged 84) Aspen, Colorado, U.S.
- Genres: Pop; Bossa nova; French pop; Standards; Soft rock
- Occupations: Singer; actress
- Instruments: Vocals; guitar
- Years active: 1963–1975
- Labels: A&M; Barnaby
- Spouses: Andy Williams (m. 1961; div. 1975) Ronald D. Austin (m. 1985)
- Children: 3

Claudine Georgette Longet (January 29, 1942 – May 14, 2026) was a French singer and actress who was popular during the 1960s and 1970s.

Longet was married to American singer and television entertainer Andy Williams from 1961 until 1975. She maintained a private profile from 1977, following her conviction for negligent homicide in connection with the shooting death of her boyfriend, Olympic skier Spider Sabich.

== Early life and career ==
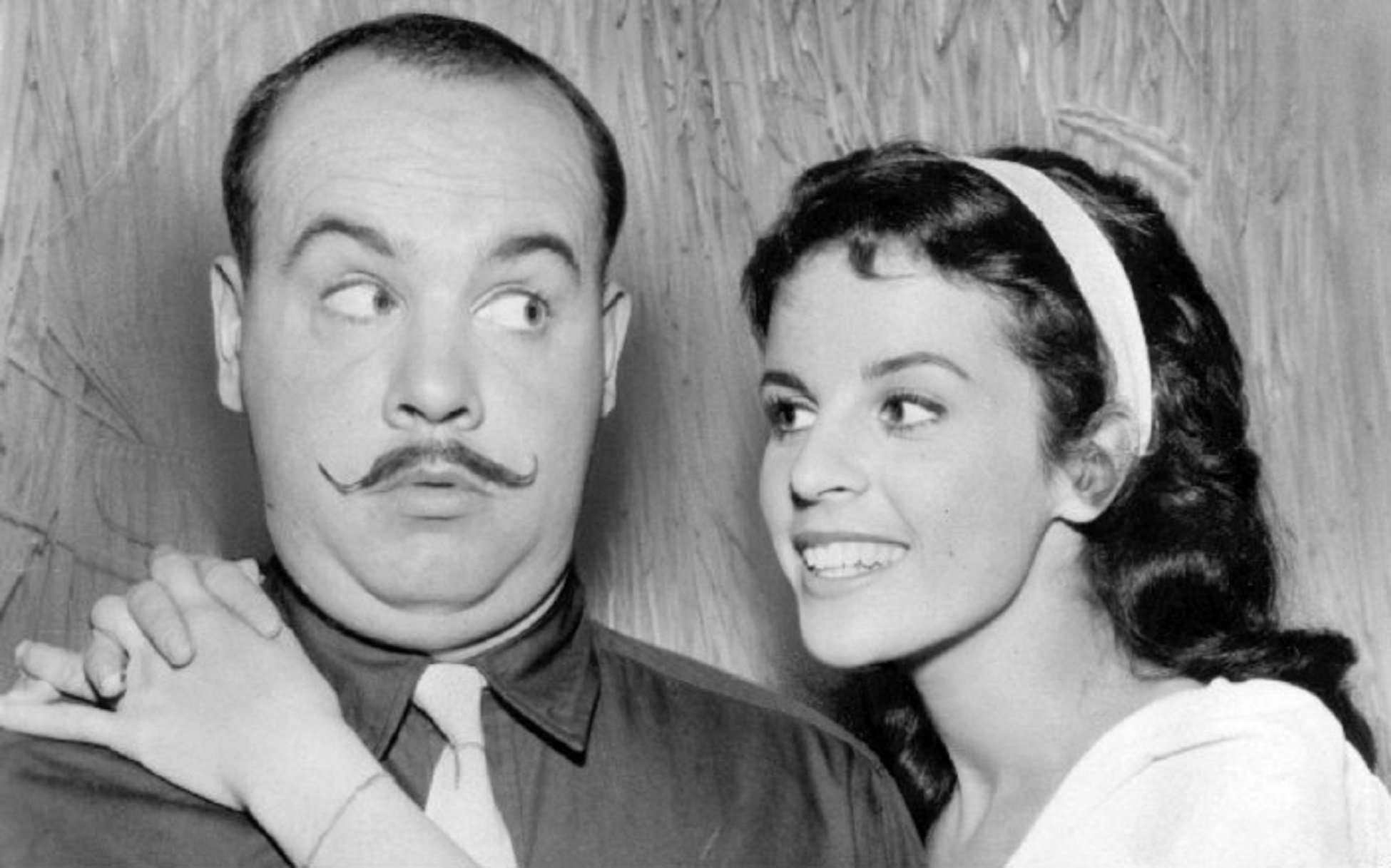
Tim Conway and Longet on TV's McHale's Navy (1963)

Claudine Georgette Longet was born in Paris, France, on January 29, 1942.

Her first appearances as an actress on television were in two 1963 episodes of McHale's Navy. She acted in the 1964 theatrical feature film of the same title. Many of her acting roles during the 1960s were in episodes of television adventure series that included Twelve O'Clock High, Combat!, The Name of the Game, The Rat Patrol, Hogan's Heroes, and Alias Smith and Jones. Longet was cast as Sharhri Javid in the 1965 episode "The Silent Dissuaders" of the NBC education drama series, Mr. Novak, starring James Franciscus.

She appeared many times on The Andy Williams Show series and specials. She occasionally appeared as a singer on other variety and music programs, including those of singers Bobby Darin and Tom Jones. Williams described Longet as "a beautiful, athletic, slender, petite brunette with large doe eyes—my favorite French singer."

== Career breakthrough and music ==
Her career breakthrough occurred in 1966. She guest-starred in the season-one finale of the series Run for Your Life starring Ben Gazzara. In the episode "The Sadness of a Happy Time", she performed her English-French bilingual rendition of Antônio Carlos Jobim's bossa nova song "Meditation" ("Meditação"). The episode was broadcast on May 16, 1966.

A&M Records cofounder Herb Alpert was among the viewers whom Longet charmed with her performance of "Meditation". When Alpert met Longet at a club in New Orleans in 1966, he offered her a recording contract with his company. Longet recorded singles, and five albums, for A&M Records between 1966 and 1970.

"Meditation" was Longet's first single release for A&M. Other Jobim compositions that she has recorded include "A Felicidade", "How Insensitive" ("Insensatez"), and "Dindi".

In 1968, Longet co-starred with Peter Sellers, Steve Franken, Gavin MacLeod, Denny Miller, along with Carol Wayne' in The Party, a box-office hit Blake Edwards wrote, produced, and directed. Longet sang the Henry Mancini and Don Black song "Nothing to Lose" in the film.

In 1971, she joined Williams's Barnaby Records label. She released singles and two albums for Barnaby: We've Only Just Begun in 1971 and Let's Spend the Night Together in 1972. She also recorded songs for a projected third album for Barnaby that went unreleased. Many of the songs for the planned third album appeared on the 1993 CD titled Sugar Me, after the Lynsey de Paul song that Longet recorded in the early 1970s, but the masters for some of the other songs are missing and presumed lost.

In 1975, she appeared as the Flower (a non-singing role) on the children's album The Little Prince, based on the novel by Antoine de Saint-Exupéry. The album won the Grammy Award for Best Album for Children in 1976.

She enjoyed some chart success. Her 1967 debut album, Claudine, peaked at number 11 on the Billboard pop albums chart in the United States. Claudine became a RIAA-certified gold album, selling more than 500,000 copies. Subsequent Longet albums The Look of Love peaked at number 33 in 1967 and Love Is Blue peaked at number 29 in 1968 on the Billboard pop albums chart in the U.S.

Longet's musical cohort on her charting albums was arranger Nick DeCaro. He also arranged her other two albums on A&M, Colours (1968) and Run Wild, Run Free (1970), as well as We've Only Just Begun (1971) on Barnaby.

She had hit singles in America on the Billboard Adult Contemporary chart. Her charting singles include her version of "Here, There and Everywhere" (music and lyrics by John Lennon and Paul McCartney), "Hello, Hello" (composed by Terry MacNeil and Peter Kraemer), "Good Day Sunshine" (composed by John Lennon and Paul McCartney), "Small Talk" (music and lyrics by Garry Bonner and Alan Gordon), and "Love is Blue" (music by André Popp and English lyrics by Marty Robbins). "Love is Blue" is a cover version of the original French song "L'amour est bleu" (French lyrics by Pierre Cour). It was sung by Vicky Leandros representing Luxembourg at the Eurovision Song Contest 1967. Another Longet track, "Wanderlove" (music and lyrics by Mason Williams), went to number seven on the singles charts in Singapore. She remains popular in Japan, where all of her original albums were reissued on CD.

== Marriage to Andy Williams ==
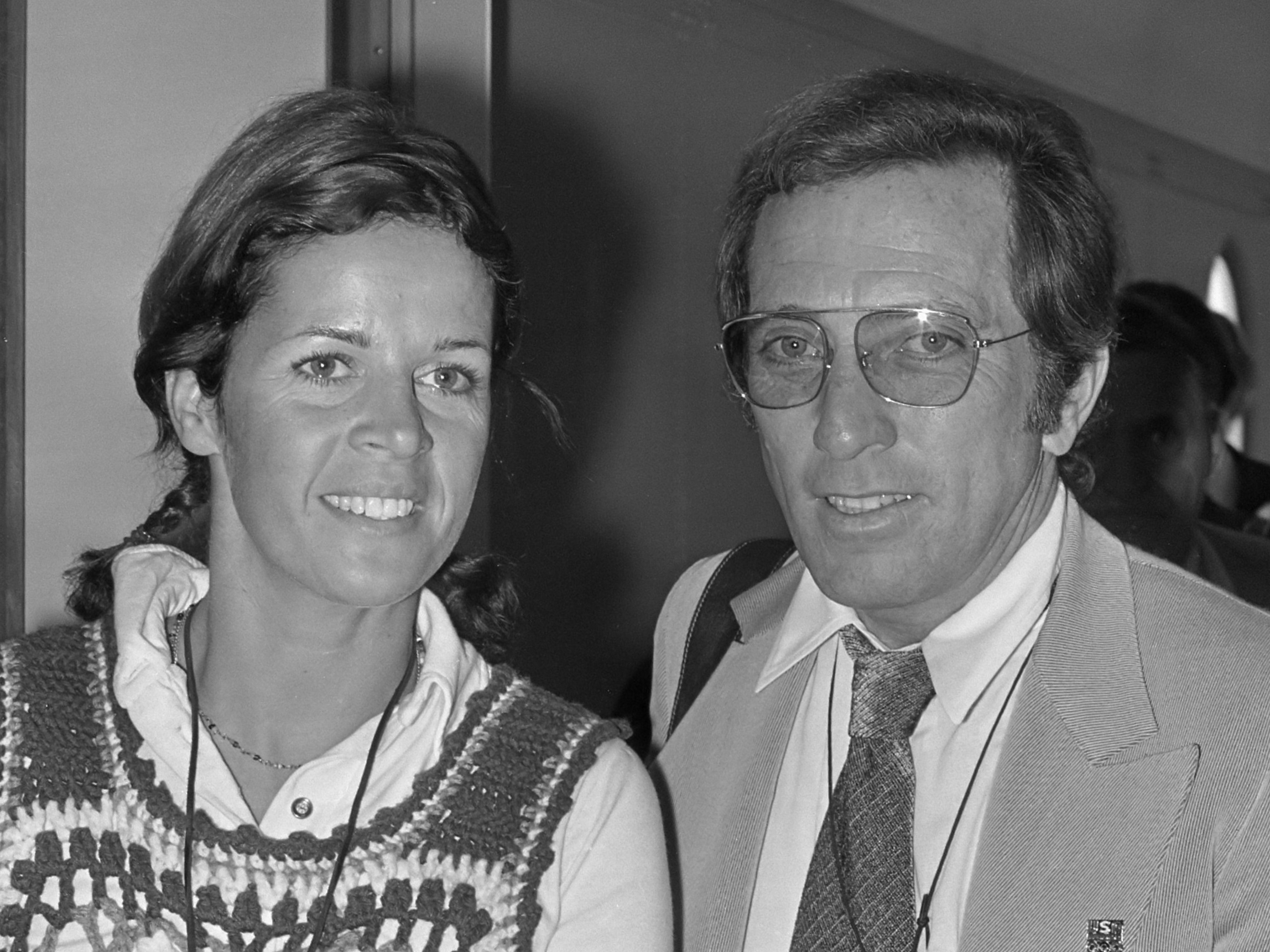
Longet and Williams in 1972

Longet and Williams met in Las Vegas in 1960 while she was a dancing lead in the Folies Bergère revue at the Tropicana Resort & Casino. Longet was having trouble with her car and had pulled over to the side of the road. Driving by, Williams stopped to offer assistance. She was 18 and he was 32. They married on December 15, 1961, in Los Angeles and had three children. They legally separated in 1970 and divorced in January 1975. According to Williams, they remained "very good friends".

== Friendship with Robert F. and Ethel Kennedy ==
Longet and Andy Williams were close friends of Senator Robert F. Kennedy and his wife, Ethel Kennedy. During the mid-1960s, the couple hosted the Kennedys at their residences in Bel Air, California, and Palm Springs, California, and spent time at the Kennedy residences at Hickory Hill and New York City. They took summer cruises together on the Salmon River in central Idaho and on the Colorado River.

On June 4, 1968, the day of the 1968 Democratic Party presidential primary in California, Kennedy—a contending Democratic presidential candidate—and his wife made tentative arrangements with Williams and Longet to visit Los Angeles's The Factory nightclub. According to Williams, Robert Kennedy told them that he would make a hand signal at the conclusion of his televised speech at the Ambassador Hotel to confirm their get-together.

Shortly after midnight on June 5, Longet and Williams were watching Senator Kennedy's televised primary victory speech in Kennedy's suite at The Ambassador. When Williams rushed down to the hotel ballroom, he heard loud noises in the hallway and learned that Kennedy had been shot. Longet and Williams eventually joined Kennedy's family and friends at Good Samaritan Hospital, where doctors labored to save the senator's life. They stayed at the hospital for 24 hours. Kennedy was pronounced dead afterwards.

Longet and Williams attended Kennedy's funeral at St. Patrick's Cathedral in New York City on June 8. A television camera captured Williams consoling a sobbing Longet during the funeral Mass. After the Mass, Longet and Williams accompanied Ethel Kennedy, Ted Kennedy, and other Kennedy family members on the 21-car funeral train that took Senator Kennedy's body to Washington, D.C., and Arlington National Cemetery for burial. The front page of the June 9, 1968, edition of the Washington Post featured a large photograph of Ted Kennedy and Longet standing together on the rear platform as the train passed through North Philadelphia.

Longet and Williams also named their son after Robert F. Kennedy.

== Arrest and trial ==
Longet was arrested and charged with fatally shooting her boyfriend, Olympic skier Vladimir "Spider" Sabich, at his home in Aspen, Colorado, on March 21, 1976. At her trial, Longet claimed the gun accidentally discharged as Sabich was showing her how it worked. Williams publicly supported Longet throughout the trial, paid for her legal defense team, and escorted her to and from the courthouse. Asked later about his unwavering support of his ex-wife, Williams said, "She is the mother of my children and we never stopped being friends. We just didn't want to be married anymore."

The Pitkin County Sheriff's Office and 9th Colorado Judicial district's investigative office made two procedural errors that aided Longet's defense: They both took a blood sample from her and seized her diary without first obtaining a warrant. According to prosecutors, the sample showed the presence of cocaine in her blood, and her diary reportedly contradicted her claim that her relationship with Sabich had not soured. To further muddle the prosecution's case, the gun was mishandled by weapons non-experts. As they were unable to cite any of the disallowed material, prosecutors used the autopsy report to suggest that when Sabich was shot, he was bent over, facing away, and at least 1.80 metres (5 ft 11 in) from Longet, which would be inconsistent with the position and relative distance of someone who is demonstrating the operation of a firearm.

The jury convicted her of negligent homicide and sentenced her to pay a small fine and spend 30 days in jail. The trial judge, George E. Lohr, allowed Longet to choose the days to be served, believing this arrangement would allow her to spend time with her children. She decided to serve most of her sentence on weekends, and her spell in Pitkin County Jail coincided with that of serial killer Ted Bundy. Critical reaction to the verdict and sentencing was exacerbated when she subsequently vacationed with her then-married defense attorney, Ronald D. Austin. Longet and Austin later married. As of 2023, they still lived in Aspen.

After the criminal trial, the Sabich family initiated civil proceedings to sue Longet. The case eventually was resolved out of court, with the provision that Longet never discuss or write about the killing or the settlement.

== Death ==
Longet died on May 14, 2026 in Aspen, Colorado at the age of 84; a cause of death was not disclosed.

== Discography ==
=== U.S. albums ===
Year	Title	Label & No.	Billboard Top LPs chart peak position	Cash Box Top Pop Albums chart peak position	Notes
1964	The Wonderful World of Andy Williams	Columbia CL 2137/ CS 8937	#9	#8	Andy Williams' album; Longet appears only on "Let It Be Me" ("Je t'Appartiens") (duet with Andy Williams); RIAA-certified gold album
1967	Claudine	A&M SP 4121	#11	#9	RIAA-certified gold album
1967	The Look of Love	A&M SP 4129	#33	#23	
1968	Love Is Blue	A&M SP 4142	#29	#31	
1968	Colours	A&M SP 4163	#155	#80	
1970	Run Wild, Run Free	A&M SP 4232			
1971	We've Only Just Begun	Barnaby/ CBS Z 30377			
1972	Let's Spend the Night Together	Barnaby/ MGM BR-15001			
1975	The Little Prince	Warner Brothers			Spoken word children's album with music score
2000	The Very Best of Claudine Longet	Varèse Vintage 302 066 118 2			Compilation

=== Selected foreign albums ===
Year	Title	Label & No.	Notes
1993	Sugar Me	Vivid M131538	Japanese issue (includes singles and previously unreleased Barnaby recordings)
1998	A&M Digitally Remastered Best	A&M/ Polydor POCM-1573	Japanese issue (compilation of key A&M recordings and a few hard-to-find singles)
2003	Cuddle Up with Claudine Longet	Munster 002	Spanish issue (2-disc compilation of Barnaby recordings)
2003	The Party	BMG France RCA Victor Gold Series 82876524862	French reissue of 1968 motion picture soundtrack (RCA Victor LSP-3997) (includes Longet's 45 rpm single version of "Nothing to Lose" as a bonus track)
2005	Hello Hello: The Best of Claudine Longet	Rev-Ola CR REV 119	British issue (compilation of key recordings for A&M Records)

=== Charting singles ===
Year	Single	Chart Positions					Label & No.
Year	Single	U.S. Hot 100	U.S. AC	Christmas Singles	Can.	Can. AC	Label & No.
1966	"Meditation (Meditação)" / "Sunrise, Sunset"	98/-	-/-	-/-	-/-	-/-	A&M 817
1967	"A Man and a Woman (Un homme et une femme)" / "Here, There and Everywhere"	-/126	-/19	-/-	-/-	-/-	A&M 832
1967	"Hello, Hello" / "Wanderlove"	91/-	8/-	-/-	93/-	-/-	A&M 846
1967	"Good Day Sunshine" / "The Look of Love"	100/-	36/-	-/-	-/-	-/-	A&M 864
1967	"Small Talk" / "Man in a Raincoat"	-/-	12/-	-/-	-/-	-/-	A&M 877
1967	"I Don't Intend to Spend Christmas Without You" / "Snow"	-/-	-/-	-/30	-/-	-/-	A&M 895
1968	"Love Is Blue" / "Think of Rain"	71/-	28/-	-/-	-/-	-/-	A&M 909
1968	"Nothing to Lose" / "White Horses"	-/-	-/30	-/-	-/-	-/-	A&M 936
1968	"Who Needs You" / "Walk in the Park" (with Tommy LiPuma)	-/-	-/23	-/-	-/97	-/-	A&M 967
1968	"Am I Blue?" / "A Flea in Her Ear"	-/-	-/28	-/-	-/-	-/-	A&M 1002
1969	"Hurry on Down" / "I Think It's Going to Rain Today"	-/-	30/-	-/-	-/-	-/-	A&M 1024
1974	"Who Broke Your Heart..." / "Goodbye Jimmy, Goodbye"	-/-	-/-	-/-	-/-	27/-	Barnaby 1190–603

== Filmography ==
- 1963: McHale's Navy (TV series), season 1, episode 17, "The Big Raffle", and episode 24, "One Enchanted Weekend", both as Yevette Gerard
- 1964: McHale's Navy (film) as Andrea Bouchard
- 1964: Combat!, season 3, episode 5, "Silver Service" as Claudette
- 1965: Twelve O'Clock High, season 2, episode 1, "The Loneliest Place in the World," as Suzanne
- 1966: Twelve O'Clock High, season 2, episode 18, "Underground," as Liane Golet
- 1966: The Rat Patrol, season 1, episode 15, "The last harbor raid" as Marianne (one of three episodes that were also shown as a film, Massacre Harbor)
- 1966: Hogan's Heroes, "It Takes A Thief... Sometimes", season 1, episode 20 as Michelle
- 1966: Combat!, season 5, episode 25, "The Partisan" as Babette
- 1968: The Party, film, as Michele Monet
- 1970: Love American Style, "Love and the Minister", season 1, episode 24 as Susan
- 1971: How to Steal an Airplane (NBC TV movie), as Michelle Chivot
- 1973: Streets of San Francisco, season 1, episode 16, "The Set-Up" as Michelle Carl

== In popular culture ==
=== In music ===
- In 1980, Mick Jagger and Keith Richards wrote a song about Spider Sabich's death that was intended to be on The Rolling Stones album Emotional Rescue. The song, titled "Claudine", had lyrics that painted a graphic picture of some of the more salacious aspects of the affair and killing. It was deemed too controversial and was removed, although it was included on several bootleg Rolling Stones albums. In November 2011, the track "Claudine" was released on the deluxe reissue of their album Some Girls.
- The Geraldine Fibbers recorded a song called "Claudine" on their 1997 album Butch. Although an instrumental, the credits show vocals courtesy of the Spider Sabich Memorial Choir.

=== In television ===
- 1976: season 1, episode 18 of Saturday Night Live featured a Weekend Update segment about "The Claudine Longet Invitational Ski Championship." It showed skiers making runs down the slopes until they are "accidentally" shot by Longet, resulting in abrupt wipeouts. Longet's attorneys wrote a cease-and-desist letter to Lorne Michaels and an apology was given in the next week's show.
- 2001: Gilmore Girls episode 1.12, "Double Date" (January 18, 2001), references Longet in a conversation between Rory, Lane, and Lorelai while her music plays in the background.
- 2003: City Confidential episode 4.13, "Aspen: Murder on the Slopes" (July 29, 2003), featured the city of Aspen and the case.
- 2018: Revue Starlight character Saijou Claudine was named after Claudine Longet. Scriptwriter Tatsuto Higuchi took inspiration for her name from the French actress. He stated that the power in her eyes resembled Claudine. He was looking for long foreign names and was looking at people named Claudine, and then was shocked when she resembled her.

=== In art ===
- 2012: Artist Josh Agle created a piece titled "Love, Spider" for the Denver Modernism Show depicting a Colorado scene with a brunette in the foreground wearing a cast signed with a heart by "Spider".
