= Claudine (Claudine Longet album) =

Studio album by Claudine Longet
- Released: April 1967
- Recorded: 1967
- Genres: Pop; Bossa nova French pop Standards
- Label: A&M
- Producer: Tommy LiPuma

Claudine Longet chronology
Claudine (1967)	The Look of Love (1967)

Professional ratings
Review scores
Source	Rating
Allmusic	link

Claudine is Claudine Longet's debut LP album. It was her first serious attempt to start a music career after she had appeared on a number of variety shows and released the single Meditation in 1966. Longet's records were part of the effort of Herb Alpert's A&M Records to expand the label's repertoire. The sessions were arranged by Nick De Caro and engineered by Bruce Botnick. Claudine reached # 11 on the Billboard pop albums chart and earned a RIAA-certified gold record for sales of more than 500,000 copies in the U.S.

== Track listing ==
1. "A Man and a Woman (Un homme et une femme)" (Pierre Barouh, Francis Lai) — 3:08
2. "Here, There and Everywhere" (John Lennon, Paul McCartney) — 2:18
3. "Meditation (Meditação)" (Tom Jobim, Newton Mendonça, Norman Gimbel, Eddy Marnay) — 3:09
4. "Tu as Beau Sourire" (Michel Jourdan, Armand Canfora, Joss Baselli) — 2:43
5. "A Felicidade" (Jobim, Vinícius de Moraes) — 3:35
6. "Wanderlove" (Mason Williams) — 2:20
7. "Hello, Hello" (Terry MacNeil, Peter Kraemer) — 2:13
8. "Sunrise, Sunset" (Jerry Bock, Sheldon Hornick) — 3:12
9. "Until It's Time for You to Go" (Buffy Sainte-Marie) — 2:18
10. "My Guy" (William Robinson) — 2:38

== Album singles ==
- Meditation (1967 - #98 pop)/ Sunrise, Sunset
- A Man and a Woman (Un Homme et un Femme)/ Here, There and Everywhere (1967- #126 pop; #19 adult contemporary)
- Hello, Hello (1967 - #91 pop; #8 adult contemporary)/ Wanderlove

== Personnel ==
- Bruce Botnick – Engineer
- Nick DeCaro – Arranger
- Tommy LiPuma – Producer
