= The Denny Vaughan Show =

Canadian music variety television series

- Genre: Music
- Country of origin: Canada
- Original language: English
- No. of seasons: 3

Production
- Producer: Loyd Brydon (1955–1957)

Original release
- Network: CBC Television
- Release: 16 June 1954 – 17 June 1957

The Denny Vaughan Show is a Canadian music variety television series that aired on CBC Television from 1954 to 1957.

== Premise ==
The series began as a 1954 mid-season production featuring Denny Vaughan (piano) and Joan Fairfax (vocals), with an informal, easy-listening approach. It entered the regular season schedule in October 1955 when it was sponsored by Lever Brothers, and its format changed to showcase segments featuring guest comedians and musicians from the US. The final season, 1956–57, reverted to a primarily musical format featuring more Canadian artists. Vaughan's orchestra was also concealed from viewers until it was seen in the last season. Guests also included French Canadian artists. However, viewership declined and the series was cancelled in 1957.

== Scheduling ==
This half-hour series was broadcast as follows (times in Eastern):

Day	Time	Season run	
Wednesday	8:00 p.m.	16 June 1954	1 July 1954
Wednesday	10:30 p.m.	7 July 1954	28 July 1954
Monday	9:30 p.m.	31 October 1955	18 June 1956
Monday	9:30 p.m.	24 September 1956	17 June 1957
