= The Mariners (vocal group) =

Pop and gospel singing group

- Origin: Brooklyn, U.S.
- Genres: Gospel; pop
- Years active: 1942–1960
- Labels: Columbia; Cadence; Tiara; Epic
- Past members: Tom Lockard; Jim Lewis; Nat Dickerson; Martin Karl

The Mariners were an American pop and gospel vocal group of the mid 20th century, particularly noted for their work with Arthur Godfrey.

The Mariners were a four-piece all-male racially integrated group (two white and two African American members). They formed during World War II, in 1942, at Manhattan Beach, Brooklyn; the four members (Tom Lockard, Jim Lewis, Nat Dickerson and Martin Karl) were serving in the United States Coast Guard there. They toured Pacific military bases in 1945.

Arthur Godfrey hired them, and they were regulars on his radio show and later his television shows for several years. The presence of the integrated Mariners brought complaints from Southern politicians and Southern CBS affiliates, which Godfrey publicly and scathingly rebuffed. Godfrey summarily fired The Mariners in 1955 (a fairly common modus for Godfrey during these years).

The Mariners then guested on other programmes, such as The Ed Sullivan Show, continued to record (on the Cadence Records label, founded by Godfrey's musical director Archie Bleyer) and appear on New York radio, but with diminishing popularity.

== Discography ==
=== Singles ===
- [Arthur Godfrey with The Mariners]: "Turkish Delight" (1948, Columbia 38246)
- "On the Island of Oahu" (1949, Columbia)
- "Sometime" (1950) (charted at No. 16)
- "With These Hands"
- "They Call the Wind Maria" (1951, Columbia 39568) (charted at No. 30)
- "I See the Moon" (1952) (charted at No. 14; their biggest and last hit)
- [Arthur Godfrey and The Mariners]: "Oh Mo'nah" (1954, Columbia 40271)
- "Zindy Lou" (1955, Cadence 1278)
- "I Heard Ya the First Time" (1958, Tiara T45-6111)

=== Albums ===
- The Mariners Sing Spirituals (c. 1956, Cadence CLP-1008)
- Hymns By The Mariners (1956, Columbia B-217)
- Fourteen Best-Loved Hymns (Columbia CL 609)
- Great American Hymns (Harmony HL 7168)
- Christmas 'Round The World (Columbia CL 6227)
- Seven Years Before the Mike [The Mariners with Arthur Godfrey]: (Columbia CL-6295 10" 33-1/3 rpm disk)
- [With Haleloke Kahauolopua and Arthur Godfrey]: Hawaiian Blossoms (Coronet KLP 024)

Singles compilation

- In Command (2006, Jasmine Records)
