= The Look of Love (Claudine Longet album) =

Studio album by Claudine Longet
- Released: October 1967
- Recorded: 1967
- Genre: Pop; Bossa nova
- Label: A&M
- Producer: Tommy LiPuma

Claudine Longet chronology
Claudine (1967)	The Look of Love (1967)	Love is Blue (1968)

Professional ratings
Review scores
Source	Rating
Allmusic	link

The Look of Love is Claudine Longet's second LP album. The sessions were arranged by Nick De Caro and engineered by Bruce Botnick. In the U.S., The Look of Love reached # 33 on the Billboard pop albums chart.

== Track listing ==
1. "The Look of Love" (Burt Bacharach, Hal David) — 3:00
2. "Man in a Raincoat" (Warwick Webster) — 3:05
3. "Think of Rain" (Margo Guryan) — 3:25
4. "How Insensitive" (Tom Jobim, Vinicius de Moraes, Norman Gimbel) — 3:15
5. "Manhã de Carnaval" (Antonio Maria, Luiz Bonfá) — 4:16
6. "I Love How You Love Me" (Barry Mann, Larry Kolber) — 2:07
7. "Creators of Rain" (Larry Smokey Mims) — 3:12
8. "When I'm Sixty-Four" (John Lennon, Paul McCartney) — 2:40
9. "Good Day Sunshine" (Lennon, McCartney) — 2:00
10. "The End of the World" (Sylvia Dee, Arthur Kent) — 2:25

== Album singles ==
- Good Day Sunshine (1967 - #100 pop; #36 adult contemporary) / The Look of Love
- Think of Rain / When I'm Sixty-Four (1967)
- Man in a Raincoat / Small Talk (1967 - #12 adult contemporary)
- I Love How You Love Me / When I'm Sixty-Four (1968)
