= Priscilla Wright (singer) =

Canadian singer

Priscilla Wright (born August 14, 1940, in London, Ontario) is a Canadian singer, most famous for the song "The Man in the Raincoat", which she first released in 1955, and re-recorded in 1988.

== Biography ==
Wright's father was choir conductor and composer Don Wright, and her maternal grandfather was Canadian Prime Minister Arthur Meighen.

Wright had a hit in the United States at the age of 14 with the song "The Man in the Raincoat" in 1955. It sold over half a million copies in the U.S. and hit No. 16 on Billboard's chart of "Most Played by Jockeys". Following this she spent 14 years singing with the Ontario group Moxie Whitney, and sang with The National Press And Allied Workers' Jazz Band Inc.

In 1991, she signed to Attic Records after a hiatus and released the album When You Love Somebody. In 1993 she was nominated for a Juno Award for Most Promising Artist.

== Discography ==
=== Albums ===
Year	Album
1992	When You Love Somebody
1995	The Singer and the Song

=== Singles ===
Year	Single	Chart Positions			Album
Year	Single	CAN AC	CAN Country	US	Album
1955	"The Man in the Raincoat"	—	—	16	singles only
1983	"God Bless You Baby"	—	38	—	singles only
1983	"Pure Love"	15	—	—	singles only
1985	"Heartbeat"	10	—	—	singles only
1985	"Say You'll Stay Forever"	9	—	—	singles only
1986	"Hungry"	15	—	—	singles only
1988	"Man in a Raincoat" (re-recording)	8	—	—	singles only
1990	"We Rise Again"	10	—	—	singles only
1992	"Closer to Saying Goodbye"	20	—	—	When You Love Somebody
1993	"Woman's Intuition"	28	—	—	When You Love Somebody
