= Canadian Officers' Training Corps =

Canadian university officer training programme

The Canadian Officers' Training Corps (COTC) was, from 1912 to 1968, Canada's university officer training programme, fashioned after the University Officers' Training Corps (UOTC) in the United Kingdom. In World War Two the Canadian Army was able to produce quality officers due to the high standards of the COTC.

The programme also existed in French-speaking universities, some technical and classical colleges, and was known as «Corps-écoles des officiers canadiens» (CÉOC). Early in the Second World War, the COTC/CÉOC became compulsory for students, except for those holding important positions in the war effort, and those excused for health reasons. Soon after the end of hostilities, the programme reverted to its peacetime volunteer basis. In 1968 it was abolished, primarily for budgetary reasons but also due to low interest on the part of students at the time, and was replaced by an alternate programme managed through local militia units. A 2010 documentary featured the history and benefits of the COTC, during a campaign aimed at bringing it, or a similar programme, back on Canadian campuses.

== Complete list of COTC Units ==
- CÉOC de l'Université de Montréal
- CÉOC de l'Université Laval
- CÉOC de l'Université d'Ottawa
- CÉOC de l'Université de Sherbrooke
- CÉOC de l'Université Sainte-Anne
- CÉOC de l'Université du Sacré-Coeur
- CÉOC de l'Université Saint-Joseph
- CÉOC du Collège Mont-Saint-Louis
- CÉOC du Collège Jean-de-Brébeuf
- Acadia University COTC
- Bishop's College/University COTC
- Carleton College/University COTC 1949
- Dalhousie University/King's College COTC
- Loyola College COTC
- Nova Scotia Technical College COTC
- McGill University COTC 1912
- McMaster University COTC
- Mount Allison University COTC
- Ontario Agricultural College COTC
- Ontario Veterinary College COTC
- Queen's University COTC
- Ryerson University COTC
- Sir George Williams College/University COTC
- St. Dunstan's College COTC
- St. Francis Xavier University COTC
- St. Mary's University COTC
- St. Thomas College COTC
- University of Alberta COTC
- University of British Columbia COTC
- University of Manitoba COTC 1914
- University of New Brunswick COTC
- University of Saskatchewan COTC
- University of Toronto COTC 1914
- University of Western Ontario COTC
- Wilfrid Laurier University COTC

== Notable members ==
- Harry Crerar (1888 – 1965), General of the Canadian Army and field commander in World War II
- W. G. Hardy (1895 – 1979), Professor, author, president of the International Ice Hockey Federation
- Pierre Trudeau (1919 - 2000), Lawyer, academic and prime minister of Canada
- Pierre Bourgault (1934 - 2003), Québec politician and essayist, as well as actor and journalist
- Jean-Paul L'Allier (1938 - 2016), Québec politician, Mayor of Québec City
- Jacques Ferron (1921 - 1985), Canadian physician and author
- Jean Lesage (1912 - 1980), Québec premier, Federal cabinet minister, lawyer
- Michel Chartrand (1916 - 2010), Canadian trade union leader from Québec, Trappist monk
- Jacques Godbout (1933 - ), Canadian novelist, essayist, children's writer, journalist, filmmaker and poet
- Victor Goldbloom (1923 - 2016), Canadian pediatrician, lecturer, and politician
- Lewis MacKenzie (1940 - ), General in the Canadian Army
- Charles Belzile (1933 - ), General in the Canadian Army
- Peter C. Newman (1929 - ), Canadian journalist
- Ed Broadbent (1936 - 2024 ), Canadian politician, leader of the New Democratic Party
- Pierre Berton (1920–2004), Canadian journalist, writer and television personality
- Don Wright (1908-2006), Canadian composer and philanthropist
